= Lions Bay =

- Village
- Village of Lions Bay
- The view across Howe Sound from Lion's Bay

- Flag
- Motto: Splendour in Serenity
- Location of Lions Bay in Metro Vancouver
- Coordinates: 49°27′29″N 123°14′13″W
- Country: Canada
- Province: British Columbia
- Regional district: Metro Vancouver
- Established as a Water Improvement District: 1964/1966
- Incorporated as a village municipality: January 2, 1971
- Amalgamated: October 22, 1999
- Seat: Village of Lions Bay Office

Government
  - Type: Mayor-council government
  - Mayor: Ken Berry
  - MP: Patrick Weiler (Liberal)
  - MLA: Jeremy Valeriote (BC Green)

Area
  - Land: 2.53 km^{2} (0.98 sq mi)

Population (2021)
  - Total: 1,390
  - Estimate (2023): 1,353
  - Density: 549/km^{2} (1,420/sq mi)
- Demonym: Lions Bayer
- Time zone: UTC−07:00 (BC Pacific Time)
- Postal code: V0N 2E0
- Area codes: 604, 778, 236, 672
- Website: www.lionsbay.ca

Lions Bay (Squamish: Ch'ích'iyúy Elx̱wíḵn, [t͡ʃʼit͡ʃʼijoj əlχʷeːqn]) is a small residential community in British Columbia, Canada, located between Vancouver and Squamish on the steep eastern shore of Howe Sound. In the 2021 census the community had a population of 1,390, BC's 36th smallest municipality by population. At 2.53 square kilometres (0.98 sq mi), it is BC's 10th smallest municipality by land area. Originally a boat-access summer camping destination for Vancouverites, Lions Bay began to be permanently settled in the 1960s. The community incorporated as a village municipality in January 1971.

== History ==
In 1889, distinctive twin peaks in the North Shore mountains were dubbed the Lions by a Judge Gray, for their supposed resemblance from Vancouver to the lion statues around Nelson's Column on London's Trafalgar Square. They are the Transformed Sisters, Ch'ich'iyúy Elxwíkn, of Coast Salish legend. The small bay on Howe Sound where pre-road climbers were dropped off to climb them was the "Lions Bay."

The extensions of the CN railway in 1954 and Highway 99 in 1958 spurred permanent residences, the area having previously mostly been summer cottages. In the 1960s, Lions Bay became a Water Improvement District. In 1999 Lions Bay amalgamated with the neighbouring unincorporated community of Brunswick Beach.

== Demographics ==
In the 2021 Census of Population conducted by Statistics Canada, Lions Bay had a population of 1,390 living in 506 of its 557 total private dwellings, an increase of 4.2% from its 2016 population of 1,334. With a land area of 2.53 km^{2} (0.98 sq mi), population density was 549.4/km^{2} (1,423.0/sq mi).

== Amenities ==
Lions Bay Beach Park has restroom and change facilities, a sandy beach protected by a log boom, and a float. Pay parking is available.

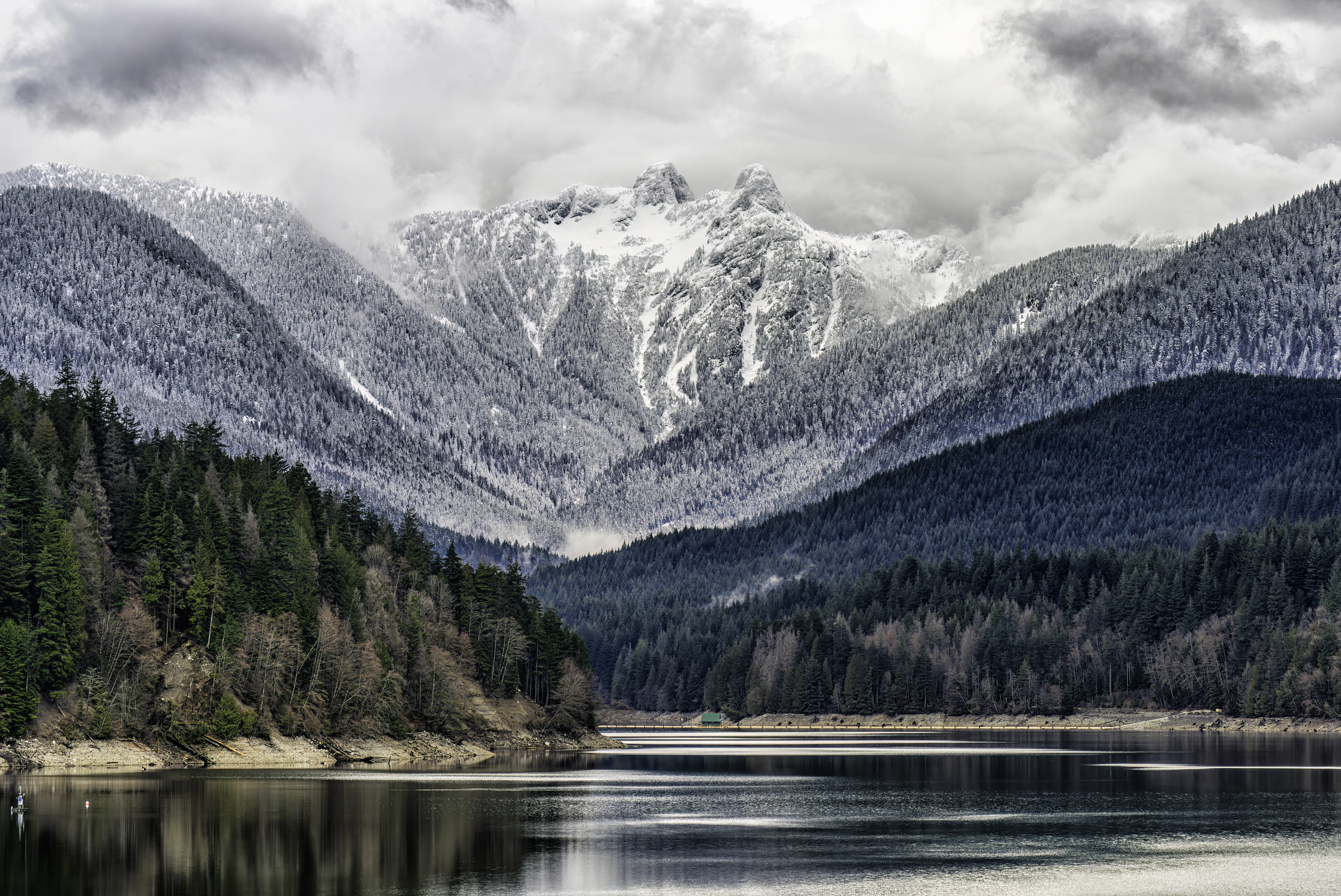
The Lions, as seen over Capilano Lake in the District of North Vancouver

The Kelvin Grove Beach and Marine park 500 meters south also has a restroom and is a popular scuba destination and dog beach.

In the 2017–18 school year, School District 45's Lions Bay School had about 30 K-3 pupils, down from peak levels in prior years of 60–80. After Grade 3, public school students bus to the K-7 Gleneagles Elementary (approx. 60 Lions Bay students out of 240) and the Grade 8–12 Rockridge Secondary (approx. 80 students from Lions Bay out of 800).

Volunteer-maintained trails run through the community, and there is multi-day pay parking available at the Sunset North trailhead.

Commercial amenities include a general store with Rural Liquor Outlet, a café (including on-tap beers for on-premise consumption), a real estate office, a 150-boat dry-storage marina and a marine service centre.

== Infrastructure ==
Under license from the Province, water is drawn at intake weirs on Harvey and Magnesia Creeks, and disinfected in two modern dual-barrier (UV and chlorine) treatment plants. Supply is sufficient for a consumption on the order of 1,100,000 liters (300,000 U.S. gal) per day in winter and 1,900,000 liters (500,000 U.S. gal) per day in summer (a relatively high per-capita consumption rate regionally). With no reservoirs possible in the steep terrain, and climate projections calling for longer, hotter summers with more-intense rainfall, a long-range study underway in partnership with UBC's Civil Engineering department is modelling hydrological characteristics of the snowfields and groundwater catchments above the village, both to know when to implement short-term consumption restrictions, and to understand long-term flow trends to have time to plan for deep wells, additional creek intakes or pipelining. In 2017 the municipality purchased the last piece of available waterfront land to hold in long-term reserve for a future peak-shaving desalination plant.

100 houses in the Kelvin Grove neighbourhood are on central sewer connected to a small secondary treatment plant renewed in 2020; remaining residences and businesses rely on individual onsite wastewater systems.

As a member of the regional TransLink public transit network, Lions Bay is served by the hourly 262 bus route. The provincial Sea-to-Sky Highway (four lanes and three overpass/underpass intersections) and CN Rail (three at-grade road crossings) run through the community.

Lions Bay is not supplied with natural gas (the pipeline runs to the north, from Coquitlam over the North Shore mountains to Squamish), so wintertime heating is by baseboard and underfloor electrical resistance heating at standard tariffs, heat pumps, oil furnaces and propane for houses with forced air ducting, and wood heat in appliances ranging from open fireplaces to airtights and pellet stoves. Despite occasionally poor wintertime air quality, Lions Bay negotiated reduced compliance with regional wood appliance regulations that started in 2019.

== Geography ==
=== Geomorphology ===
Geomorphology in the area is a product of recent glaciation and post-glacial erosion. The last, or Fraser, glaciation began 33,500 years ago and reached its peak 17,500 years ago. Ice retreat was delayed several thousand years by floating glaciers grounding on the seabed, with several minor readvances. Glacial marine sedimentation (mud and rock dropped from icebergs) is believed to have ceased by 10,600 years before present. The weight of ice had depressed the land surface, so during deglaciation the sea flooded the land up to 220 m higher than it is today. Sea-level fell rapidly as the land rebounded, such that by about 10,000 years ago sea level was 10 m below present. By 5700 years ago it was at approximately modern levels. With the ice gone, water erosion and mass wasting (debris slides and flows, rockfall, avalanches) rapidly reworked unstable glacial sediments, declining over time such that by no later than 7,500 years ago the landscape was similar to today. Steep rockfall aprons developed on mid to lower slopes. Magnesia, Alberta and Harvey Creeks reincised their debris cones and alluvial fans have formed at their mouths into the ocean.

=== Climate ===
Howe Sound at Lions Bay experiences a maritime climate with a moderate temperature regime and a winter precipitation peak. Temperatures are cool December through February, and warm July and August. A pronounced precipitation peak starts in October and extends through January. Precipitation increases with elevation due to orographic uplift, because air masses condense when they cool as pressure drops when they are driven upward by mountain slopes. Annually, approximately 2000 mm of precipitation falls at sea-level, increasing to 4000 mm at the ridge crest 1200 to 1400 m above. At mid and high elevations, both rain and rain-on-snow are important drivers of winter runoff and groundwater recharge, both being quantified in the Lions Bay-UBC Long-Range Hydrology Study.

Climate data for Lions Bay
Month	Jan	Feb	Mar	Apr	May	Jun	Jul	Aug	Sep	Oct	Nov	Dec	Year
Record high °C (°F)	16 (61)	17 (63)	22 (72)	24 (75)	28.5 (83.3)	32.5 (90.5)	34 (93)	33.5 (92.3)	30.5 (86.9)	23.5 (74.3)	16.5 (61.7)	17 (63)	34 (93)
Mean daily maximum °C (°F)	6.1 (43.0)	7.7 (45.9)	10.5 (50.9)	13.9 (57.0)	17.1 (62.8)	20.1 (68.2)	22.7 (72.9)	22.4 (72.3)	19.8 (67.6)	13.5 (56.3)	8.2 (46.8)	5.3 (41.5)	13.9 (57.0)
Daily mean °C (°F)	3.8 (38.8)	4.9 (40.8)	7.2 (45.0)	9.9 (49.8)	12.9 (55.2)	15.9 (60.6)	18.3 (64.9)	18 (64)	15.5 (59.9)	10.4 (50.7)	5.9 (42.6)	3.2 (37.8)	10.5 (50.9)
Mean daily minimum °C (°F)	1.5 (34.7)	2.1 (35.8)	3.7 (38.7)	6 (43)	8.7 (47.7)	11.5 (52.7)	13.8 (56.8)	13.6 (56.5)	11.1 (52.0)	7.3 (45.1)	3.5 (38.3)	1.2 (34.2)	7 (45)
Record low °C (°F)	−8 (18)	−12 (10)	−4 (25)	1 (34)	2.5 (36.5)	6 (43)	9 (48)	9.5 (49.1)	5.5 (41.9)	−3.5 (25.7)	−12.5 (9.5)	−11 (12)	−12.5 (9.5)
Average precipitation mm (inches)	229 (9.0)	161 (6.3)	161 (6.3)	139 (5.5)	101 (4.0)	79 (3.1)	55 (2.2)	63 (2.5)	71 (2.8)	198 (7.8)	289 (11.4)	212 (8.3)	1,757 (69.2)
Average rainfall mm (inches)	218 (8.6)	152 (6.0)	158 (6.2)	139 (5.5)	101 (4.0)	79 (3.1)	55 (2.2)	63 (2.5)	71 (2.8)	198 (7.8)	286 (11.3)	202 (8.0)	1,722 (67.8)
Average snowfall cm (inches)	10.5 (4.1)	8.3 (3.3)	3.1 (1.2)	0 (0)	0 (0)	0 (0)	0 (0)	0 (0)	0 (0)	0.2 (0.1)	2.6 (1.0)	10.7 (4.2)	35.3 (13.9)

== Geology ==
Local geology comprises lower-Cretaceous Gambier Group marine sedimentary and volcanic bedrock. Upslope, the headwaters of Magnesia, Alberta and Harvey Creeks are underlain by mid-Cretaceous era "Coast Plutonic Complex" rock, which has intruded into the older Gambier rocks. Outcrops primarily consist of greenish volcanic rock that is highly fractured (10 cm fracture spacing) with red oxidation on exposed surfaces. Prominent northwest trending faults and jointing create structural discontinuities that cause instability.

== Government & politics ==
Lions Bay is a self-governing municipality with an elected mayor and four councillors setting policy. Execution of policy and administration is managed by a chief administrative officer through five staff working out of the municipal offices, and five at the Frank Smith Works Yard. The village's Klatt Public Safety Building houses the 30-volunteer Fire Department, an ambulance station leased to the BC Ambulance Service, and Lions Bay Search & Rescue. Policing is provided by the Squamish RCMP detachment. Lions Bay is part of the Metro Vancouver Regional District, although does not currently participate in its water, drainage or sewer functions. The mayor is a member of Mayors' Council, one of Translink's several quasi-governing bodies.

In 2018 Lions Bay's average residential non-rural property assessment of $1.62 million was the fourth-highest of all assessment areas in the province, behind only the University Endowment Lands ($3.51 million), West Vancouver ($3.24 million) and Anmore ($1.65 million).

In the 2017 provincial election, 567 of Lions Bay's approx. 1000 eligible voters voted 43% Liberal (centre-right), 28% Green, and 18% NDP (left). Politics besides, Lions Bayers tend to support environmental causes, such as the UNESCO Biosphere initiative for Howe Sound and glass-sponge reef protection, and are generally opposed to reindustrialisation of Howe Sound (such as Woodfibre LNG, McNabb Creek gravel mining and clearcut wood harvesting).

Lions Bay federal election results
Year	Liberal		Conservative		New Democratic		Green	
2021	35%	359	36%	375	16%	170	11%	111
2019	32%	303	35%	336	6%	58	25%	236

Lions Bay provincial election results
Year	New Democratic		Conservative		Green		Liberal	
2024	21%	262	40%	507	39%	499	0%	0
2020	20%	250	0%	0	36%	438	44%	531
2017	18%	162	0%	0	37%	331	44%	394

The municipality is small, with a 2017 operating budget of $3.3 million (raised 50% by property taxes and 50% by fees plus grants). 2017 average per-parcel taxes, utility and fees of $7,647 were the 2nd highest in BC. The 2017 operating budget was:

- $1.2 mil. for 11.15 staff
- $819,000 water operating cost ($1,420 per connection)
- $416,000 volunteer fire department ($720 per residence)
- $865,000 everything else.

Capital spending is funded by federal and provincial grants, debt, and occasionally taxation when the spend is overdue. In 2017, for example, a $2.71 million capital project to replace and remove four water tanks and improve water distribution network was 50% funded by the federal government, 33% by the provincial government, and 17% by 30-year debt funding for the local contribution (with 92% voter approval in a referendum).

=== Lions Bay Fire Rescue ===
A volunteer fire department with 30+ trained members provides in-village and forest interface firefighting and MVA rescue services on Highway 99. Many members go on to permanent roles at professional departments; a training at Lions Bay Fire Rescue is considered one of the best available in western Canada.

=== Lions Bay Search And Rescue ===
Lions Bay Search And Rescue was established in the 1980s following a series of landslides which caused a number of deaths and briefly cut the highway and isolated the village. Although initially set up to provide the village with a measure of self-sufficiency in an emergency, the SAR team has developed over time into a primarily mountain rescue group. Trails and peaks accessible from Lions Bay attract large numbers of hikers and climbers, especially in warmer months. Hiking trails in the area are demanding; a hike from Lions Bay to the top of the West Lion gains 1500 meters in elevation with a round trip travel time of 6–8 hours for fit hikers. Every year an increasing number of hikers are injured, lost or caught out in the dark while hiking in this area, increasing demand on Lions Bay Search and Rescue in cooperation with the Provincial Emergency Program.

== Geographic names around Lions Bay ==
- In 1792, Capt. Vancouver named Howe Sound for Adm. Richard Howe, and Anvil Island for its shape.
- In 1857–1861, Capt. Richards of the survey sloop HMS Plumper named many features in Howe Sound after the ships and officers of Howe's 1 June 1794 naval battle ("The Glorious First") against the First French Republic during the French Revolutionary wars:
  - Mt. Harvey, Harvey Creek, Mt. Brunswick and Brunswick Beach for Capt. John Harvey of HMS Brunswick
  - Gambier Island for Capt. James Gambier, and the Defense Islands for his ship, HMS Defence
  - Bowyer Island for Adm. George Bowyer, whose flagship was HMS Barfleur under Capt. Cuthbert Collingwood, commemorated in Barfleur Passage between Keats and Pasely Islands, and Collingwood Channel, between Keats and Bowen Islands. Captain Sir Richard Goodwin Keats was not present at the Glorious First, but a well known Royal Navy officer of the day.
  - Bowen Island for James Bowen, master of HMS Queen Charlotte, and Pasely Island for Rear-Admiral Thomas Pasley on HMS Bellerophon.
- Alberta Bay, Alberta Creek: perhaps after the province, which was named for a daughter of Queen Victoria.
- Kelvin Grove, a mid-1980s developer name, ultimately from Glasgow's Kelvin river.

== See also ==
- List of francophone communities in British Columbia
