= Christie Islet Migratory Bird Sanctuary =

Migratory Bird Sanctuary in British Columbia, Canada

- Location within British Columbia
- Location: Howe Sound, British Columbia, Canada
- Nearest city: Vancouver, British Columbia, Canada
- Coordinates: 49°29′58″N 123°18′07″W
- Area: 0.81 ha (2.0 acres)
- Designation: Migratory Bird Sanctuary
- Established: 1962
- Governing body: Canadian Wildlife Service

The Christie Islet Migratory Bird Sanctuary is a small migratory bird sanctuary on the south coast of British Columbia. It was established in 1962 by Environment and Climate Change Canada. Located in Howe Sound just south of Anvil Island, it is a small rocky island where seabirds nest, and Harbour seals roam the surrounding waters. To protect the birds' nesting habitat, public access to the islet is not allowed, however is it possible to observe birds by boat.

== Indigenous involvement ==
The islet is located on the traditional territory of the Squamish Nation and the Shishalh Nation who have inhabited the land for thousands of years prior to the arrival of settlers. Both Nations speak languages that are a part of the Coast Salish dialect. The territory of the Squamish Nation spans from Western Howe Sound to Roberts Creek in the Sunshine Coast Regional District, and in the Metro Vancouver Regional District includes Burrard Inlet, English Bay, and False Creek. The territory of the Shishalh Nation spans Howe Sound to Queens Beach in Jervis Inlet. Both Nations have been active in biodiversity conservation and restoration activities in Howe Sound and surrounding regions.

== Geography ==
The sanctuary is located on the southern end of Howe Sound, a 42 km long and 21 km wide sound that receives freshwater from the Squamish River on its north end and connects with the Salish sea on its south end. The coordinates of the sanctuary are 49°30’ N, 123°18 W, making it 30 km north of Vancouver. It is 0.81 hectares in size and its surface is a combination of rocks, grasses, and serviceberry. The maximum elevation is about 20 m above sea level.

== Environmental issues and restoration ==
Howe Sound has undergone environmental degradation since industrialization began in the region in the 20th century. Acid mine drainage from the Britannia Mine is responsible for significant amounts of pollution and biodiversity loss in the waters of Howe Sound and the surrounding land. In the 1970s, ongoing conservation and restoration efforts began in the region, as it is an important habitat to a wide variety marine animals and birds.

In 2021, Howe Sound was recognized as a site of ecological importance and is one of nineteen designated UNESCO biosphere reserves in Canada. The area is also internationally recognized as an Important Bird Area. According to UNESCO, biodiversity and ecological productivity are improving in the region.

Resulting from the UNESCO biosphere reserve designation, a restoration project called Restore the Shore was launched in Howe Sound in 2021. Led by the Squamish Nation, the project focuses on restoring over 144 acres of estuary land that the endangered Chinook salmon depend on for survival.

== Species and habitat ==
Christie Islet is used as a perching, mating, and nesting site by the largest amount of seabirds in the Vancouver area. Oystercatcher seabirds have populated the islet for approximately a century, and other seabirds for a few decades. The islet is not home to any land predators or mammals with the exception of Harbour seals in the surrounding waters.

Seabirds spend the majority of their time in flight, and only stop to mate, nest, or rest. They inhabit rocky cliff areas to prevent interactions with possible predators, and the tall cliffs make it ideal to use wind to take flight. Christie Islet is 75% rock and the rest consists in short grass and shrubs. The crevices, ledges, burrows, shrubs, and cliffs on the rock make it an ideal nesting site for seabirds.

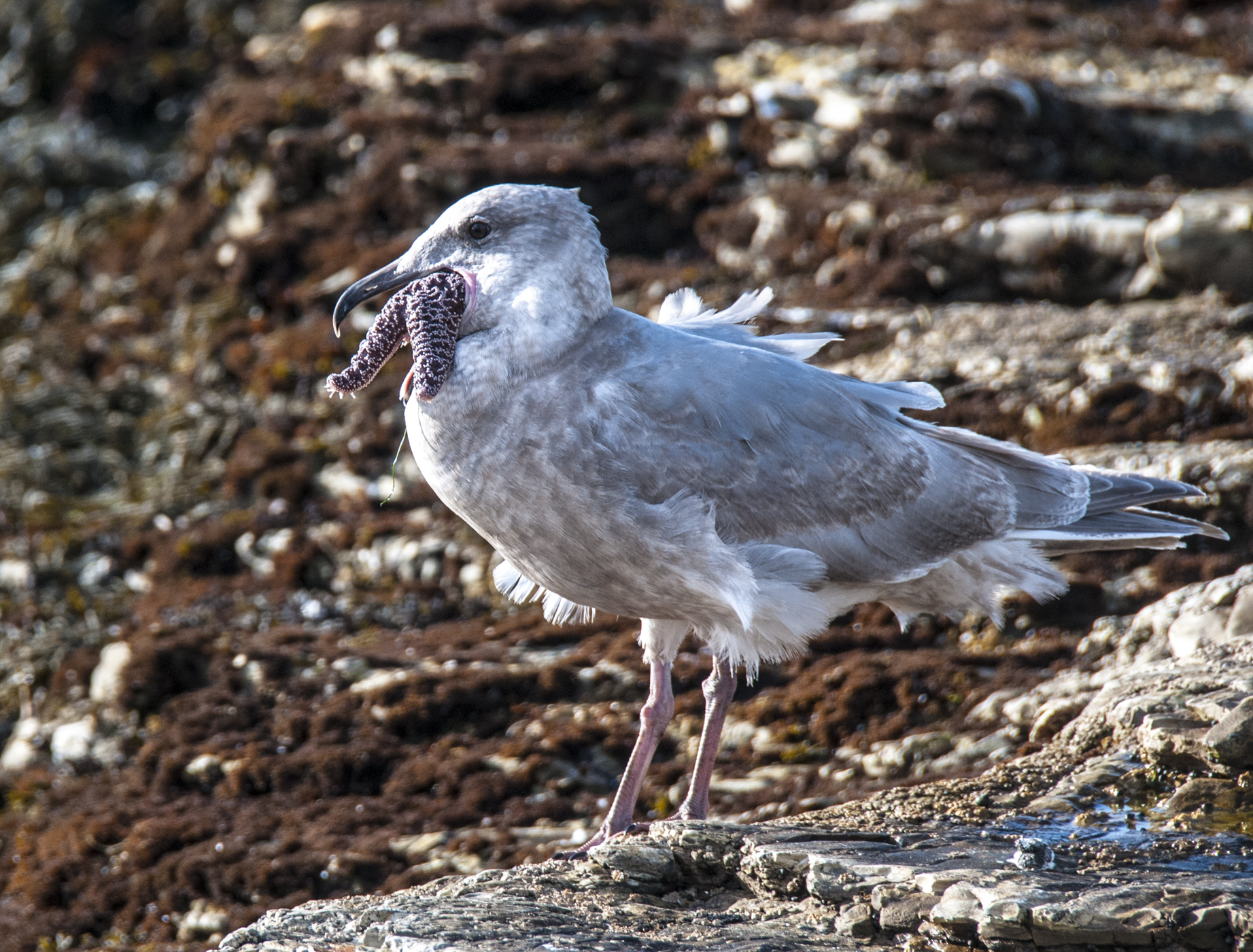
Immature glaucous-winged gull feading

All the following are the primary seabird species found on the Christie Islet Migratory Bird Sanctuary in Howe Sound:

- Rock sandpiper – Have not been seen since in Howe Sound since 2007
- Black turnstone – Steady in population
- American black oystercatcher – Steady in population
- Surf scoter – High population in Outer Howe Sound, reducing population in the Inner Sound
- Pelagic cormorant
- Glaucous-winged gull – Christie Islet is the main breeding ground for these birds in Howe Sound
- Double-crested cormorant
- Pigeon guillemot – Seen in low count
- Northwestern crow
- Harlequin duck – In serious decline in the upper region of Howe sound, but steady in the Outer Sound
- Canada goose – Large population
- Bald eagle – Large population

The following are either federally or provincially listed as species at risk found in Howe Sound and on Christie Islet:

- Marbled murrelet
- Brandt's cormorant
- Western grebe
- Horned grebe
- Common murre
- Long-tailed duck
- California gull
- Peregrine falcon
- Pacific Great Blue Heron

== Regulation ==
Federal laws protect all regularly occurring seabirds, waterbirds (except cormorants and pelicans) and colonies when they are located in Migratory Bird Sanctuaries.

Prohibited Activities in Migratory Bird Sanctuaries:

- Hunting of migratory birds
- Disturbance, destruction, or taking of nests of migratory birds
- Possession of live migratory birds, carcasses, skins, nests, or egg.

Possession of firearms and entry into the sanctuary in general are restricted. The only exceptions are residents or persons residing in the sanctuary within their residence or while in transit. These regulations are in place to safeguard the migratory birds and their ecosystems within the sanctuary.

== Guideline to avoid disturbance to birds ==
Seabirds and waterbirds are highly vulnerable to human disturbance, especially during their breeding season (May–July). Protecting their colonies is of utmost importance, and adherence to guidelines is essential to minimize disruption. Disturbance can lead to the abandonment of nests, wasted energy reserves, and increased vulnerability to predation, environmental conditions. Disturbances may also cause chicks to leave nests prematurely, resulting in chick mortality. The following are things to keep in mind when approaching the bird sanctuary.

On the Water:

- Maintain distance: a distance of 300 m from Christie Islet is recommended (If you realize that you have accidentally approached a colony, leave quietly.)
- Limit noise: Sudden and loud noises and blow horns can cause disturb habitat.

From the Air:

- Avoid aircraft disturbance: Aircraft can severely disturb colonies, with a risk of bird collisions. Aircraft should not fly below 300 m (1000 feet) over the sanctuary. (This includes unmanned aerial vehicles such as drones.)
