= New Brighton (Gambier Island) =

- Location of New Brighton in British Columbia
- Coordinates: 49°27′02″N 123°26′16″W
- Country: Canada
- Province: British Columbia

New Brighton is an unincorporated settlement on the southwest side of Gambier Island in the Howe Sound region of British Columbia, Canada. It is the main wharf and settlement area on the island. The other named community on the island is Gambier Harbour, to its east.

== History ==
A post office operated at New Brighton from 1919 to 1945.

== Getting There ==
New Brighton is served by the BC Ferries-operated passenger vessel Stormaway, which provides regular service between Langdale and New Brighton. The service operates year-round, with reduced service in winter, and the crossing takes approximately 10 minutes.

The Stormaway has a passenger capacity of approximately 30 to 40 people and provides an alternative to private boat access.

As of 2026, fares varied by age and whether tickets were prepaid, with children under 5 travelling free.
