= Furry Creek =

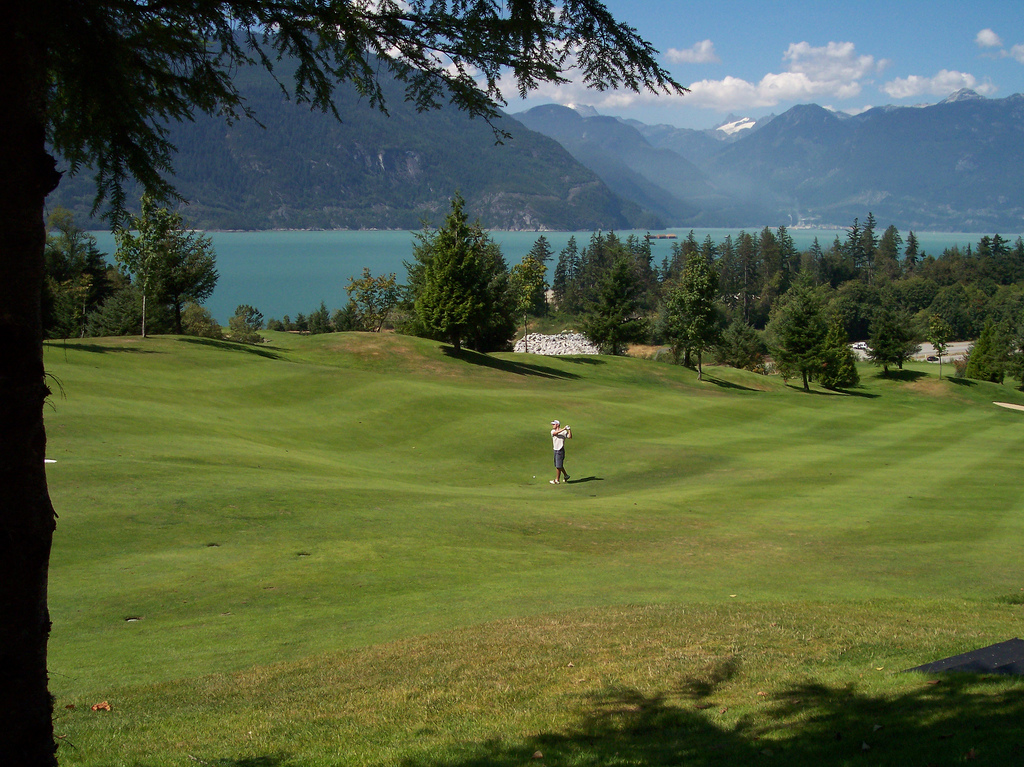
- Golfing at Furry Creek

- Location of Furry Creek in British Columbia
- Coordinates: 49°35′00″N 123°12′40″W
- Country: Canada
- Province: British Columbia
- Area codes: 250, 778

Furry Creek is a community in the Canadian province of British Columbia, located on Howe Sound in the Squamish-Lillooet Regional District, north of Vancouver and south of Squamish.

== History ==
The creek was named in the 1870s after early prospector and settler Oliver Furry. Loggers worked the slopes, and a two adits from the Britannia Creek mine opened into Furry Creek where logging camp supplied timbers for mine shoring in the early 1900s. Dams on Phyllis and Marion Lake and Furry Creek redirected water from Furry Creek to the Britannia mine for power generation. Later in the century a gravel pit operated in the area. Cabins and borstal at nearby Porteau Cove made the area sparsely populated for many years, with some camping and little other activity except for the highway and railroad that cut through the bottom of the watershed.

== Furry Creek Hydro ==
There is a run-of-river hydro plant located one kilometre up Furry Creek. Built in 2004, a weir in the creek diverts water to a 3-kilometre penstock dropping 366 metres to a powerhouse with a pelton wheel capable of generating 11 MW of electricity. In 2010 the plant was sold to Veresen Inc. an Independent power producer, which is contracted to sell power to BC Hydro.
