= Defence Islands =

Island group in British Columbia, Canada

Coordinates: 49°35′00″N 123°17′00″W

The Defence Islands are two small islands in Howe Sound, British Columbia, Canada, northeast of Anvil Island and in the northern reaches of that sound near Porteau Cove. The easterly and smaller of the two comprises Defence Island Indian Reserve No. 28 (1.7 hectares); the westerly comprises the Kwum Kwum Indian Reserve (unnumbered, 6.20 hectares), both under the administration of the Squamish Nation.

== Name origin ==
"Named c1860 by Captain Richards, RN, after HMS Defence, 74 guns, under Captain James Gambier, engaged in Earl Howe's victory of "the Glorious First of June" 1794, when the Defence had the distinguished honour of first passing through the enemy's line... After serving at the Nile, at Trafalgar and in the Baltic she was driven ashore on the coast of Jutland by a terrific gale, 23 December 1811, and all of her 600 men perished but five."
