= Anvil Island =

Island in British Columbia, Canada

Lhaxwm (Squamish)
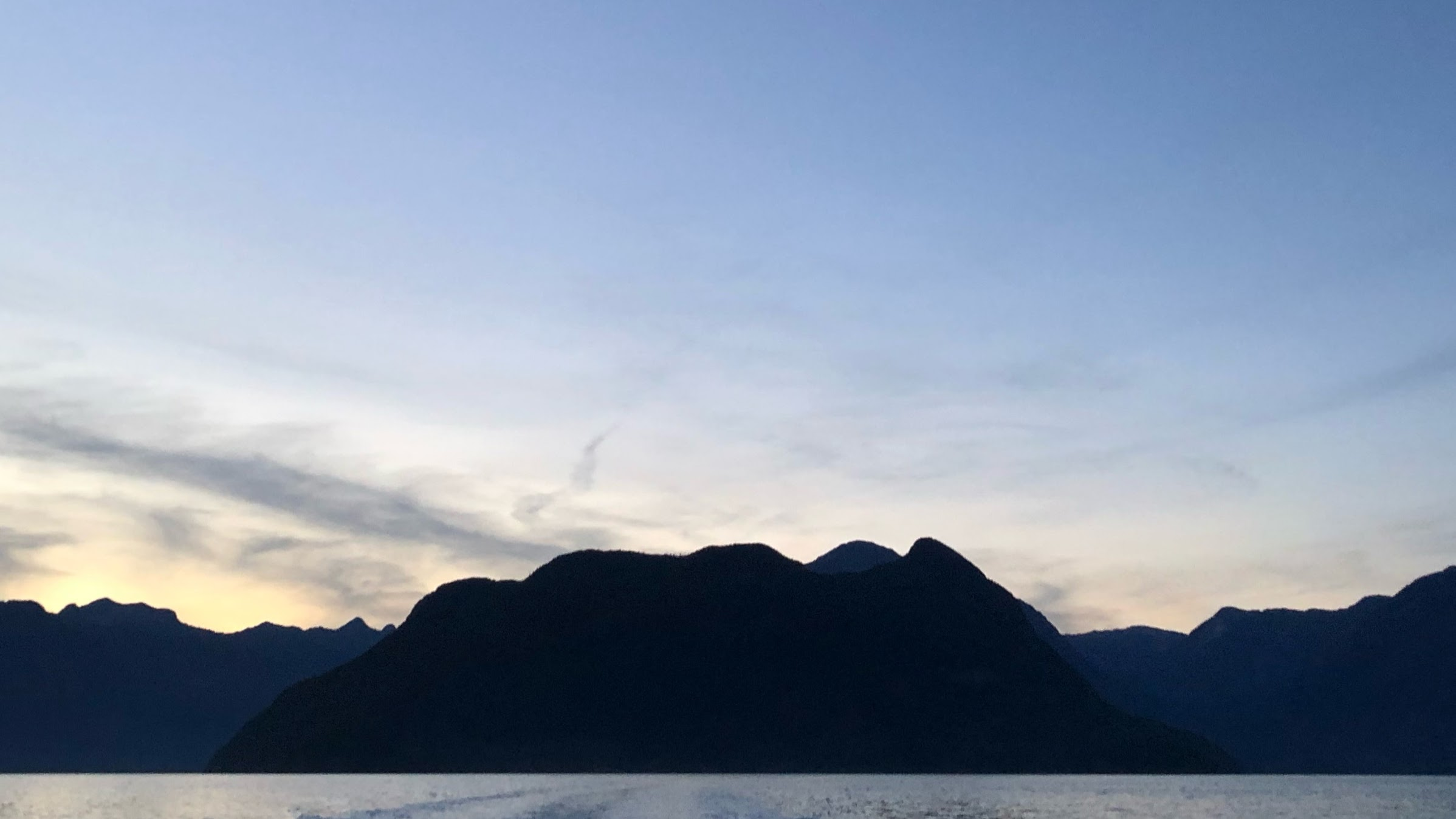
- Anvil Island viewed from the south shortly after sunset.
- Interactive map of Anvil Island
- Etymology: Unknown

Geography
- Location: Howe Sound
- Coordinates: 49.530000°N 123.309000°W
- Adjacent to: Defence Islands N. Porteau Cove E. Christie Islet S. Gambier Island W.
- Area: 9.5 km^{2} (3.7 sq mi)(Approx.)
- Area rank: 3rd in Howe Sound
- Coastline: 14 km (8.7 mi)(Approx.)
- Highest elevation: 765 m (2510 ft)
- Highest point: Leading Peak

Administration
- Canada
- Administered under the Sunshine Coast Regional District

Demographics
- Population: ~6 (2025)

Anvil Island (Squamish: Lhaxwm) is the third-largest of the islands in Howe Sound, British Columbia, Canada, and the northernmost of the major islands in that sound. It is part of West Howe Sound, Electoral Area F within the Sunshine Coast Regional District (SCRD) on the Sunshine Coast.

The island offers steep unforgiving terrain from sea to sky, along with diverse ecology in its forests and along the coastline.

It is located northeast of Gambier Island and southwest of Britannia Beach and west of Porteau Cove. The Defence Islands are to its northeast and are Indian reserves of the Squamish Nation. Christie Islet Migratory Bird Sanctuary is south of the island.

Daybreak Point Bible Camp, operates on the southside of the island alongside several private cottages.

== Name origin ==
The name was conferred on June 14, 1792, by Captain George Vancouver, whose journal for the day reads:

"The sun shining at this time for a few minutes afforded an island which, from the shape of the mountain that composes it, obtained the name of Anvil Island."

The indigenous Squamish name for the island is Lhaxwm, although the meaning of the name is unknown. It was an important place of spiritual training. In mythology, a serpent resided at the peak of the island.

== Geography ==
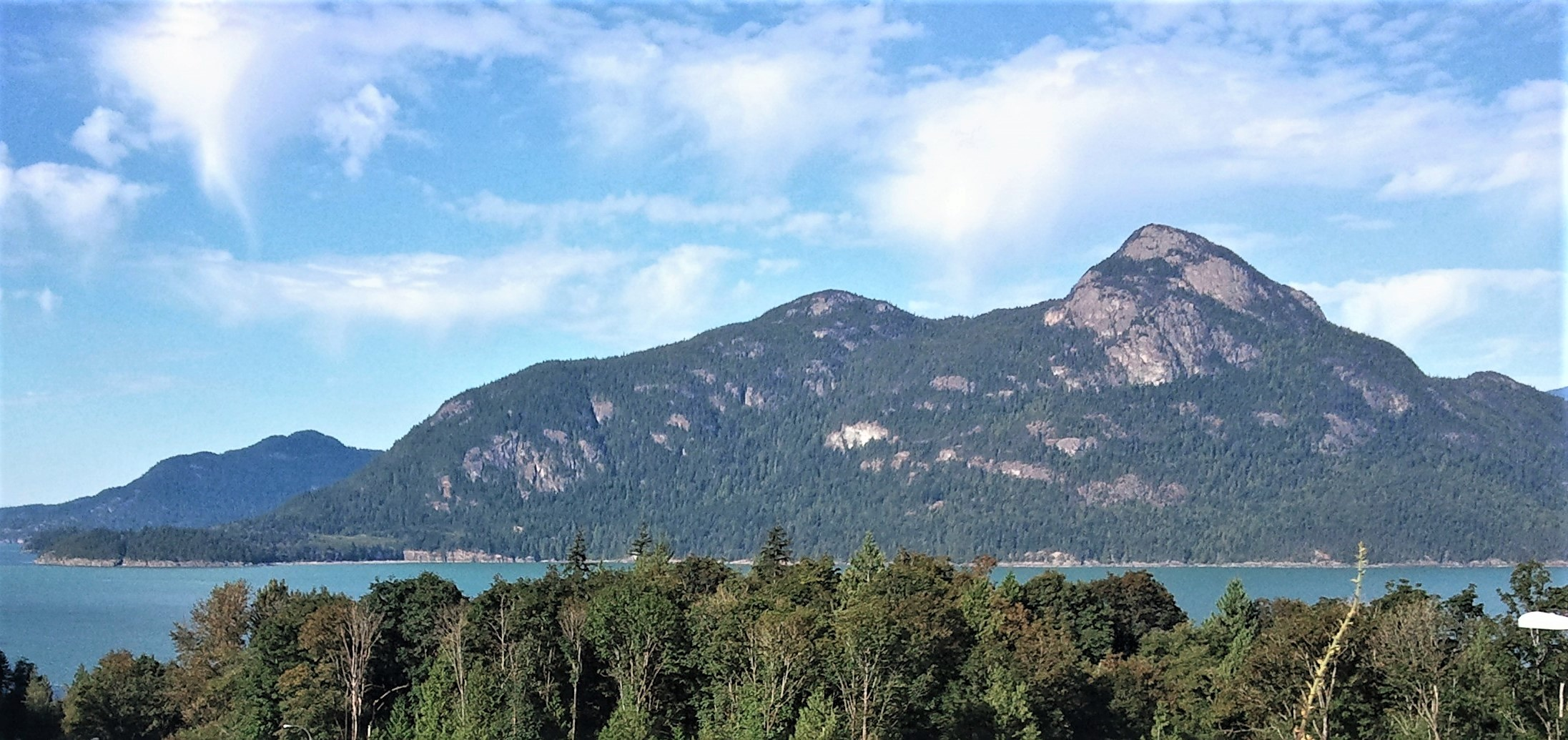
East aspect of Anvil Island. The highest point is Leading Peak (765 meters).

=== Terrain ===
The terrain of Anvil Island is primarily rocky cliffs and steep hills that line the coast. However, at the south side of the island on either side of Irby Point, the southernmost point of the island, there is flatter terrain. Following the Montagu Channel northward on the east side of the island there juts out Fern Point with Fern Bay facing the south and North Bay facing the north. This section is relatively flat with both bays having beaches and Fern Point being lined with cliffs into the water. Following the coast, north of North Bay is Ram Bay marking the end of the relatively flat land on the sound of the island. Domett Point marks the northernmost point of the island, being lined with cliffs and large hills. Heading south along the Ramillies Channel Anvil's coastal terrain continues with substantial cliffs and impassable hills.

Inland from Irby Point, northwards, there is a prominent incline which leads first to a rocky outcropping approximately 400m in elevation, this is the location of the 'white spot' a popular hike on the way to Leading Peak. Before the peak of the island, there are two ridges which hug the lake and Champside Creek. The top of the western ridge is named Nighthawk Peak and has a trail leading from the camp traversing the west side of the island. The eastern ridge is unnamed and unexplored. In between the lake and the peak, there is a saddle which forms a low terrain before rising significantly towards Leading Peak. Leading Peak is surrounded by large cliffs which vary in height from 10 to 50 metres. Domett Point is made up of similar terrain to the sides of the island, being made up of large rocky hills and steep cliff faces.

=== Ecology ===
Anvil Island's ecology is determined by its biogeoclimatic zone of the Coastal Western Hemlock, comprising two main subzones, dry maritime and very dry maritime. This zone's conifers include the dominant Western hemlock, Western red cedar, Douglas fir, and Grand fir. Deciduous trees like the Red alder, Bigleaf maple, and Black cottonwood are common to the south end of the island in the very dry maritime subzone.

While there are two distinct biogeoclimatic subzones on Anvil, the island also hosts many sensitive ecosystems. The majority of these ecosystems are mature forests hosting old growth trees. As of December 23, 2020, there are 195.2 hectares of old growth forests on Anvil Island covering 20.5% of the island, of which 82.6 Ha are 151 to 250 years old according to the BC Ministry of Forests.

Herbaceous ecosystems are spread throughout the island in areas of thin soil on rocky outcroppings and along the shoreline. These ecosystems can be vegetated with grasses, herbs, and bushes. They are particularly sensitive to human activity as the plants are: "easily trampled or dislodged onto bare rock where it cannot be re-established."

There are nine ecosystems that are primarily cliffs on Anvil, the most prominent of which are the cliffs on Leading Peak. These ecosystems provide shelter to unique life on the island such as bats, snakes or lizards. Their steep open slopes are great spots for recreational climbing, with one spot in particular on the west coast of the island where in 2023 British climber Tim Emmett sent a 5.14b project named "Archimedes Principle."

== People ==
Anvil Island has a small population living on the island year-round and is populated mostly during the summer.
