= Passage Island (British Columbia) =

Island in Canada

- Location in Metro Vancouver

Geography
- Location: Metro Vancouver Electoral Area A
- Coordinates: 49°20′36″N 123°18′20″W

Additional information
- Time zone: BC Pacific Time (UTC−07:00)
- Postal code: V7W 1V7
- Area codes: 604, 778, 236, 672

Passage Island is a small island near West Vancouver, British Columbia, and across from Bowen Island in Canada. The island is mostly woodland and cliffs. It marks the entrance to Howe Sound, and the ferry between Horseshoe Bay to Nanaimo regularly passes it. The island borrows a postal code, V7W 1V7, from the wealthiest community in Canada, West Vancouver. However, Passage Island is actually overseen by the Islands Trust and is part of the Metro Vancouver Regional District. It is isolated from West Vancouver by approximately two km (1.2 mi) of ocean.

Prior to European colonization, the island was home to a Squamish village named Mi'tlmetle'lte. It was named by Captain Vancouver for the fact that it lies midway between Point Atkinson and Bowen Island, in the Queen Charlotte Channel.

In 1893, the island was sold for a dollar an acre by a banker named Keith, and was later bought in the late 1960s by a developer named Phil Matty. "No utilities, no garbage trucks, no telephones, no fire stations, no policemen, no industry—just 32 acres of beautiful British Columbia. I escaped to that paradise for a few hours each week to move rocks, saw logs, watch the tide come in and go out—all in the name of therapeutic basket weaving. It was like having my own personal psychiatrist. I loved it. I loved it so much that I bought it."

Today the island has 61 lots, almost half of which are developed. Although many lots consist of summer cottages, there are a few year-round homes with full-time residents. The island has views of downtown Vancouver, the University of British Columbia campus, Vancouver Island, and the snow-capped mountains of Howe Sound. There are no developed roads nor vehicles on the island. Most of the homes use solar photovoltaics, with a few complemented by wind turbines for electric power. Propane is used for heating and cooking, and rainwater is captured into cisterns from their roofs. Island residents either tie their boats to mooring buoys and row to shore, or provide their own private docks for island access. Public access onto the island is not provided.

Off the southernmost tip is a small private island. Unnamed, the island is owned by a local family.
