= Gambier Island =

Island in British Columbia, Canada

Coordinates: 49°29′35″N 123°23′35″W

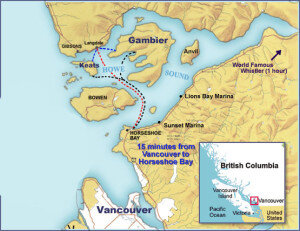
Gambier Island, displayed on a map with other islands and the coast of British Columbia.

Gambier Island is an island located in Howe Sound near Vancouver, British Columbia. It is about 17,049 acres (6,899 hectares) in size and is located about 10 kilometres (6.2 miles) north of the Horseshoe Bay community and ferry terminal in westernmost West Vancouver.

A rugged and sparsely populated island, it is far quieter than its neighbor Bowen Island, which is popular with day-trippers and summer vacationers. Gambier Island is accessible only by B.C. Ferries passenger service, water taxi or other boats. There is no central road network.

The island elects two trustees to the Islands Trust, an organization that unites small island communities in British Columbia to oversee development and land use. Other islands in Howe Sound include Keats Island and Anvil Island. The island is part of West Howe Sound, Electoral Area F within the Sunshine Coast Regional District (SCRD) on the Sunshine Coast of British Columbia, Canada.

== Population ==
There are around 150 long-term residents on Gambier, but the population swells to more than 800 in the summertime due to the island's recreational properties. The island's scenic setting and solitude make it popular with artists and writers.

Other informed estimates reflect that the number is around 200 full-time residents.

== Communities ==
The main wharf and settlement area is called New Brighton, on the west side of the island. Gambier Harbour, West Bay, lies to the east, with another wharf and boat dock. At the north end of the island is Ekins Point. Off-grid communities include Douglas Bay, Daisy Bay, Gambier Acres, Ekins Point, Brigade Bay (coordinates ), Fircom Plateau (coordinates ), Sea Ranch (coordinates ).

== Facilities ==
Gambier Island had a general store (closed about 2010) and few seasonal options for accommodations. Barging companies provide service from Gibsons and Horseshoe Bay for transport of large items. Fire service is run by volunteers. There are no garbage processing facilities on the island. There is a community center.

Halkett Bay Provincial Park is located on the southeast side of Gambier.

== History ==
Squamish people called the island Cha7élkwnech, in reference to its deep protected bays. It was a celebrated deer hunting area and was extensively used for resource gathering.

The island was named by Captain Richards in 1860 for James Gambier, Admiral of the Fleet who had a distinguished career in the British navy, was a Governor of Newfoundland and served as a negotiator of the Treaty of Ghent ending The War of 1812 between Britain and the United States. Logger Ken Reid cut a 14-foot diameter fir there in the 1930s.
