= Gambier Harbour =

- Location of Gambier Harbour in British Columbia
- Coordinates: 49°26′00″N 123°26′00″W
- Country: Canada
- Province: British Columbia
- Area codes: 250, 778

Gambier Harbour is a harbour and unincorporated settlement on the east side of the southwest end of Gambier Island in the Howe Sound region of British Columbia, Canada, which is immediately northwest of Vancouver. The settlement and post office were formerly named Grace Harbour, and also Gambier Island.

== History ==
Gambier Harbour (Post Office and Steamer Landing) adopted 4 October 1945 on C.3577, as labelled on BC Lands' map 2A, 1938. Form of name changed to Gambier Harbour (Post Office) 21 November 1963. Form of name changed to Gambier Harbour (community) 17 May 1979. Grace Harbour Post Office was opened 12 October 1937, located on the north shore of Grace Harbour just east of the wharf. Name changed to Gambier Island Post Office 9 April 1938. Name changed to Gambier Harbour Post Office 3 October 1941. Former USS service to Gambier Harbour discontinued (date not cited) and connection is by water taxi from Langdale via New Brighton, as required. Gambier Harbour Post Office relocated 350 yds north (inland) 1 November 1965. Gambier Harbour Post Office closed 16 August 1974.
