= Schenks and Chekwelp =

Schenks (Squamish Schètx̱w) and Chekwelp (Ch’ḵw’elhp) are two villages of the Indigenous Squamish, located near what is now known as Gibsons, British Columbia. Although vacant for years, these villages are told in the oral history as the birthplace of the Squamish, after what they call the Great Flood. There are two Indian reserves of the Squamish Nation at this location, Chekwelp Indian Reserve No. 26 and Chekwelp Indian Reserve No. 26A.
