= Bowyer Island =

Island in British Columbia, Canada

Coordinates: 49°25′30″N 123°16′0″W

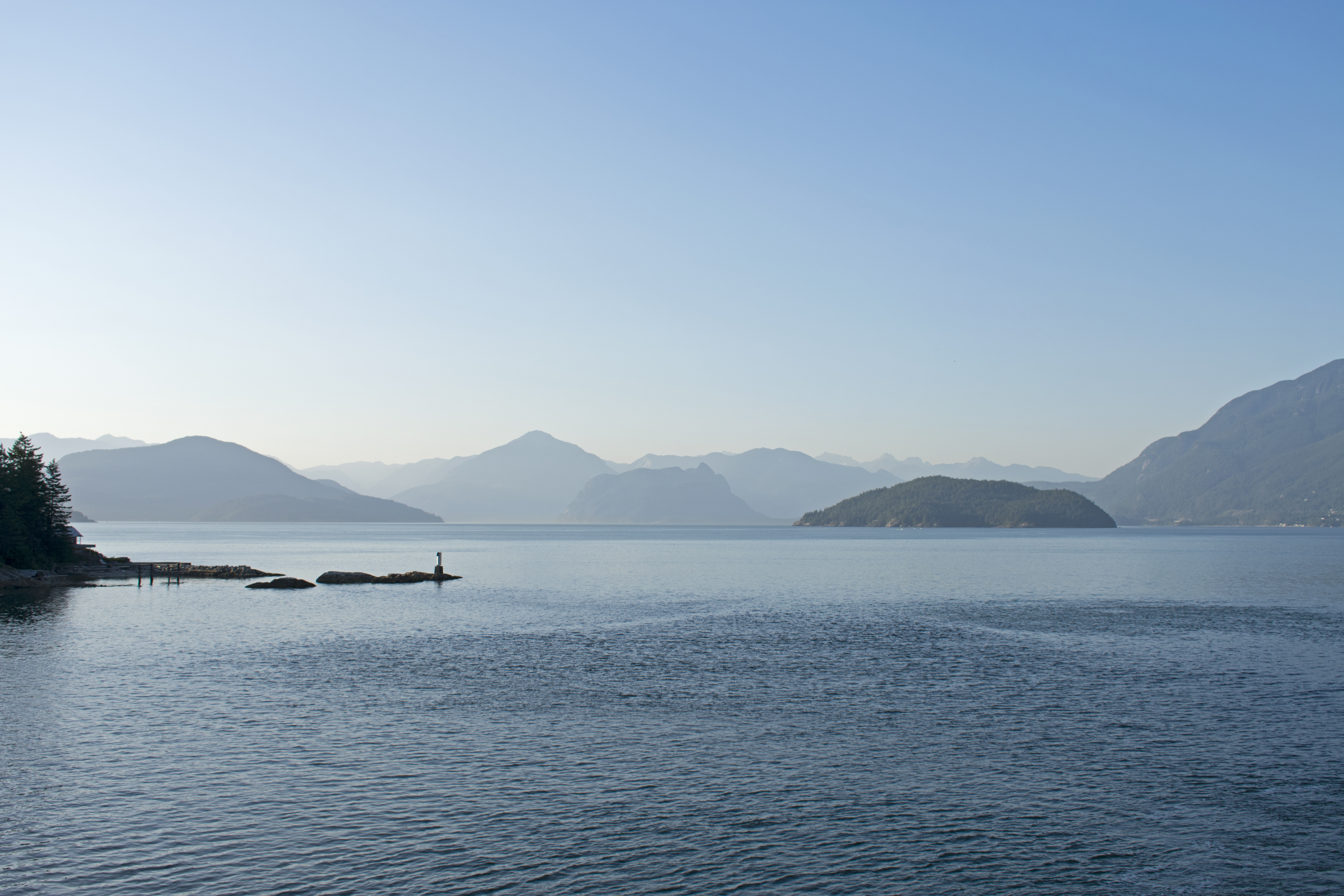
Bowyer Island, to the right, in Howe Sound

Bowyer Island is a small private island in Howe Sound. It comprises Kildare Estates, Bowyer Island Estates, and B and A Estates. It is located east of Bowen Island and Horseshoe Bay. BC Liberal politician, formerly Attorney-General of British Columbia, Geoff Plant is a seasonal resident.

Bowyer Island was named by Capt. George Henry Richards of HMS Plumper between 1857 and 1861, after Rear-Admiral George Bowyer, (1740–1800), commander of HMS Barfleur during the Glorious First of June (all the names used in Howe Sound are in honour of the battle of the Glorious First of June).

== Access and Public Use ==
Although Bowyer Island is described as a private island, this designation refers to the upland areas. Public access to its foreshore is protected under British Columbia’s Crown land policy and common law. The foreshore — defined as the area between the high and low water marks — is almost entirely owned by the provincial government, and the public retains a "bare licence" to access it, subject to respectful and lawful use.

Land ownership on Bowyer Island adheres to this legal framework. Parcel mapping for private lots on the island shows that property boundaries extend only to the High Water Mark (HWM), leaving the beach area below accessible to the public. The HWM, also called the natural boundary, typically corresponds to the highest reach of the strongest tides and is often visible as the line where driftwood and marine debris accumulate and where salt-intolerant vegetation begins to grow.

While docks and upland areas are privately owned, the beaches below the high water mark remain public unless otherwise designated by official authority. This interpretation is supported by policies from the Ministry of Water, Land and Resource Stewardship and reflected in land use bylaws administered by the Islands Trust.
