= Port Mellon =

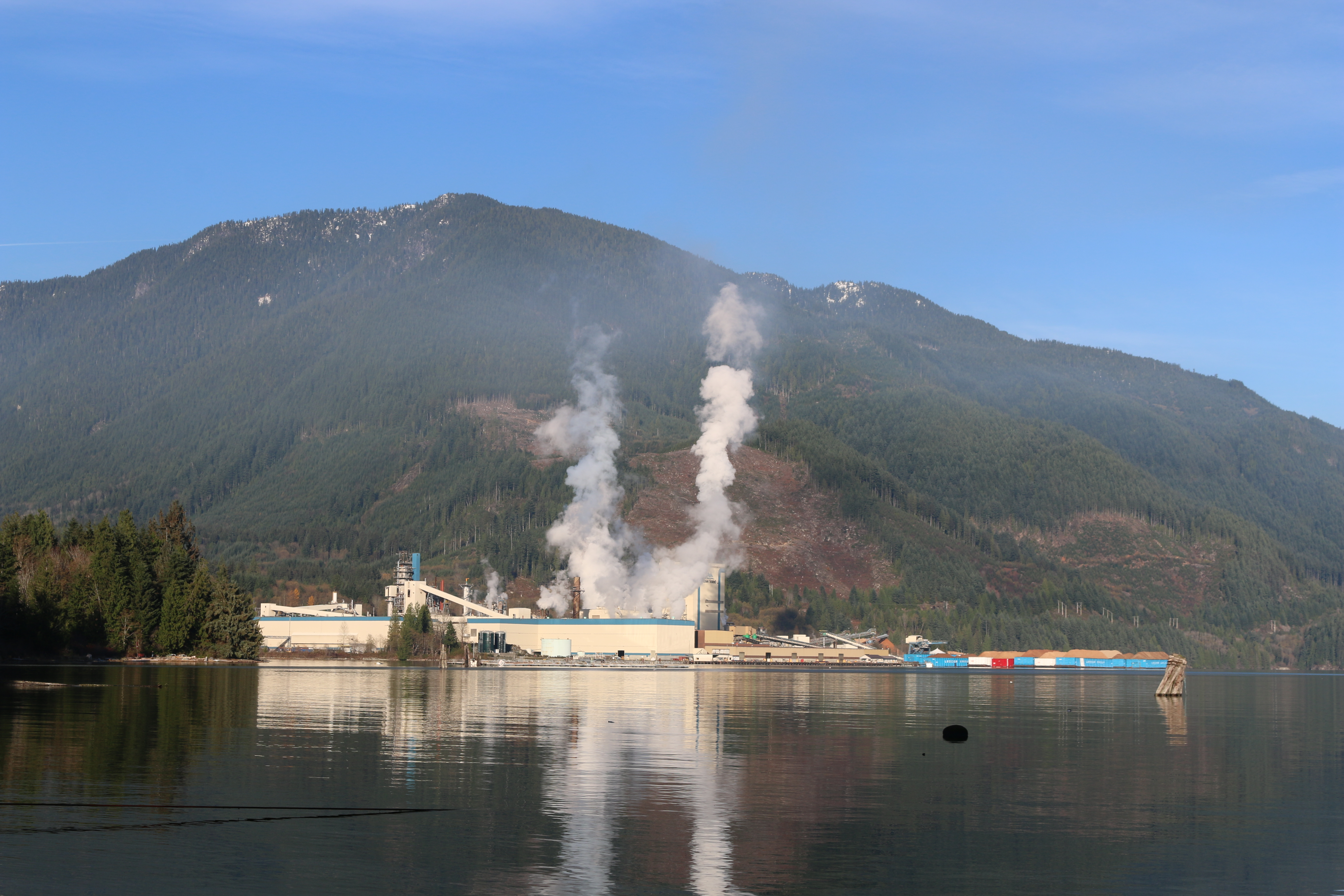

- Location of Port Mellon within British Columbia, Canada
- Coordinates: 49.520°N 123.490°W
- Country: Canada
- Province: British Columbia

Dimensions
  - Width: 200 mi (320 km)

Port Mellon is a settlement in British Columbia, Canada, located within the territory of the Squamish Nation, and part of West Howe Sound, Electoral Area F within the Sunshine Coast Regional District (SCRD). Port Mellon is the home to the region's largest employer, the Howe Sound Pulp & Paper Mill.

While Port Mellon does not have a commercial district, amenities are available a short drive away in Gibsons, British Columbia. Metro Vancouver is accessible via the nearby Langdale Ferry Terminal.

Nearby Tetrahedron Provincial Park is a popular location for hiking and camping.

The settlement was named for Captain Henry Augustus Mellon who came to Vancouver in 1886.

== Mill Closure ==
On August 20, 2026, Domtar announced the "indefinite idling" of the pulp mill, citing "reduced demand from Asia, unprecedented and sustained poor pricing for pulp globally, and a decline in affordable domestic [fibre]".
