= Howe Sound =

Sound in British Columbia, Canada

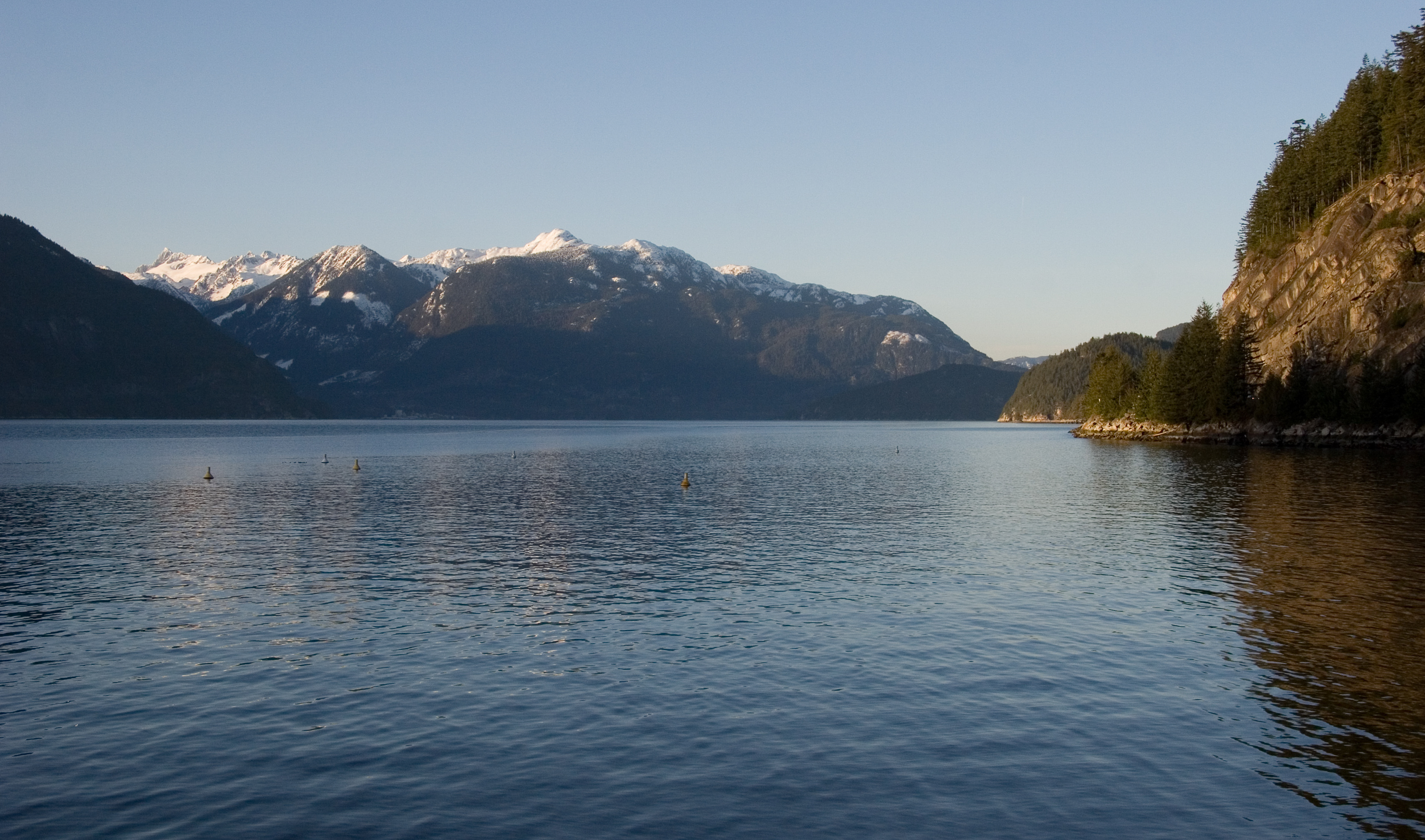
- Looking up Howe Sound from Porteau Cove

- Location within British Columbia

- Map of Howe Sound showing Highway 99
- Coordinates: 49°30′00″N 123°19′00″W
- Type: Sound
- Etymology: Richard Howe
- Part of: Salish Sea
- Primary inflows: Squamish River
- Basin countries: Canada
- Designation: UNESCO Biosphere Reserve (2021)
- Max. length: 42 km (26 mi)
- Frozen: Never
- Islands: Anvil Island, Bowen Island, Gambier Island, Keats Island, and other minor islands
- Settlements: West Vancouver, Squamish, Gibsons, Lions Bay, Snug Cove

Howe Sound is a roughly triangular sound, that joins a network of fjords situated immediately northwest of Vancouver, British Columbia, Canada. It was designated as a UNESCO Biosphere Reserve in 2021.

== Geography ==
Howe Sound's mouth at the Strait of Georgia is situated between West Vancouver and the Sunshine Coast. The sound is triangular, opening to the southwest into the Strait of Georgia, and extends 42 km (26 mi) northeast to its head at Squamish. There are several islands in the sound, three of which are large and mountainous in their own right. The steep-sided mainland shores funnel the breezes as the daily thermals build the wind to 20 knots (37 km/h; 23 mph) or more at the northern end of the sound on a typical summer day. A small outcrop of volcanic rock is located on the eastern shore of Howe Sound called the Watts Point volcanic centre.

== History ==
The history of Howe Sound begins with the Indigenous people, the Squamish and Shishalh whose village sites and camp sites are spread throughout the area. The land and islands are still used by Squamish and Shishalh for cultural practices. Both the Squamish and Shishalh are a part of the Coast Salish linguistic and cultural groupings.

Spanish explorer José María Narváez observed the sound in 1791 and named it Boca del Carmelo. Captain George Vancouver entered the sound in 1792, and named it after Admiral Earl Howe.

In 1888, copper was discovered in the mountains around Britannia Creek, south of Squamish. Large scale mining began at Britannia Beach in 1905, and by 1929, the largest copper mine in the British Empire was located here, beside the shores of Howe Sound. The mine closed in 1974 and part of its historical legacy has been large amounts of copper contaminated effluent deposited into Howe Sound.

In September 2021, Howe Sound was designated a UNESCO Biosphere Reserve in recognition of its recovery from industrial pollution and to promote sustainable development.

== Name ==
The Sound and many of its features are named after British naval officers. There were multiple Indigenous names in use prior to the colonial period, and the Sound is often referred to by a Squamish name, Átl’ḵa7tsem, meaning "paddling north".

== Restoration ==
In the 20th century Howe Sound experienced high industrial growth. The Britannia mine, chemical plants, and sulfur mills emitted hazardous chemicals and heavy metals into the waters of Howe Sound and the surrounding land. Although the Britannia mine was shut down in 1974, these pollutants persisted in the ecosystem.

The pollutants, as well as over-fishing and hunting, led to a dramatic decrease in biodiversity. Humpback whales, orcas, dolphins, seals, salmon, and other species all suffered severely. The salmon population decreased, reducing food availability in the estuaries that surround Howe Sound.

Howe Sound annually contributes $7.5 billion dollars in ecosystem services. Multiple groups rallied to the cause of protecting Howe Sound, including My Sea to Sky, Restore the Shore, and Marine Stewardship Initiative.

In 2021 the Area was granted the status of a Biosphere Reserve by UNESCO. The restoration work in Howe Sound has resulted in the return of sea animals such as Humpback whales, Minke Whales, Orcas, and sea lions.

== Islands ==
Passage Island marks the entrance to Howe Sound. It has a few year-round residents. It has views of Downtown Vancouver and Vancouver Island. An unincorporated area, it is part of the Metro Vancouver Electoral Area A which is a member of the Metro Vancouver Regional District. Ships entering Howe Sound will pass east or west of Passage Island.

In direct view from Horseshoe Bay lies Bowyer Island, another steep sided private island with seasonal homes along its south and west shores. Named in 1857 after Rear-Admiral George Bowyer, Commander of HMS Barfleur. Like Passage Island, Bowyer Island is also an unincorporated area and part of the Metro Vancouver Electoral Area A which is a member of the Metro Vancouver Regional District.

Bowen Island is the most populous island and is nearest Vancouver, being just opposite Horseshoe Bay. It is incorporated as an island municipality and is a member municipality of Metro Vancouver.

Gambier Island is the largest of the Howe Sound islands, to the northwest of Bowen, near the Langdale ferry landing. Gambier has a small resident population, plus hundreds more who enjoy the southwest peninsula community in the summer months. This area has a year-round foot ferry, Stormaway IV, run by BC Ferries, and a community centre. Until recently, the only commercial location on the island, the General Store, was located here, near New Brighton, where the ferry lands. The store is now closed. This area of Gambier has landline power and telephone. There also are numerous seasonal homes lining the shores of the southern bays (West Bay, Centre Bay, Port Graves, and Halkett Bay) along with several local yacht club outstations in both the southern and northern parts of the island. Beyond the southwest peninsula, seasonal visitors rely on solar, wind and generator power. The northwestern shore of Gambier, with adjacent Thornborough Channel, is still dominated by the forest industry. The "pond" at Andy's Bay is one of North America's largest logsorts. A resident-operated woodlot on provincial land (WL039) is located near Andy's Bay, with active logging and reforestation. The northeast quadrant of Gambier also is Crown land, with two more major woodlots proposed by the provincial Ministry of Forests, but not pursued as yet due to the opposition of many local residents, members of the Squamish Nation, whose territory this includes, and concerned supporters of a less-industrial Howe Sound. The island has excellent hiking in the provincial Crown land that dominates its north sector.

A third, smaller but extremely steep and conical island to the northeast of both is Anvil Island or Lhaxwm. Anvil Island has a summer church camp, Daybreak Point Bible Camp, as well as a number of seasonal cottages. All buildings on Anvil are located on its southern side on either end of Irby Point. North Bay, which looks out to Mount Garibaldi and The Black Tusk, is often exposed to strong overnight and winter outflow northerly winds, often called 'the Squamish' derived from where it comes.

Keats Island, near Gibson's Landing, has numerous summer homes lining its shores, in addition to a large church camp for children, a large retreat resort and Plumper Cove Marine Provincial Park. The island is serviced by water taxi from Langdale. There is a small core of permanent residents living in Eastbourne.

Between Keats and Bowen Islands lie the Pasley group, a cluster of privately owned islands, each with a scattering of seasonal homes. Further southeast lies Worlcombe Island, also seasonally inhabited.

Uninhabited islands in the northern section of Howe Sound include the Defence Islands, a pair of rocky islands that comprise the Defence Islands Indian Reserves 28 and 28A.

Christie Islet and Pam Rocks just south of Anvil Island are recognized bird breeding sites and a great place to view seals sunning themselves. Pam Rocks is a reporting weather station for the marine weather system. Winter northerly gales can reach close to hurricane force here, known as squamish.

Between Gambier Island and the Port Mellon mill lies Woolridge Island, privately owned with a single residence.

== Transportation ==
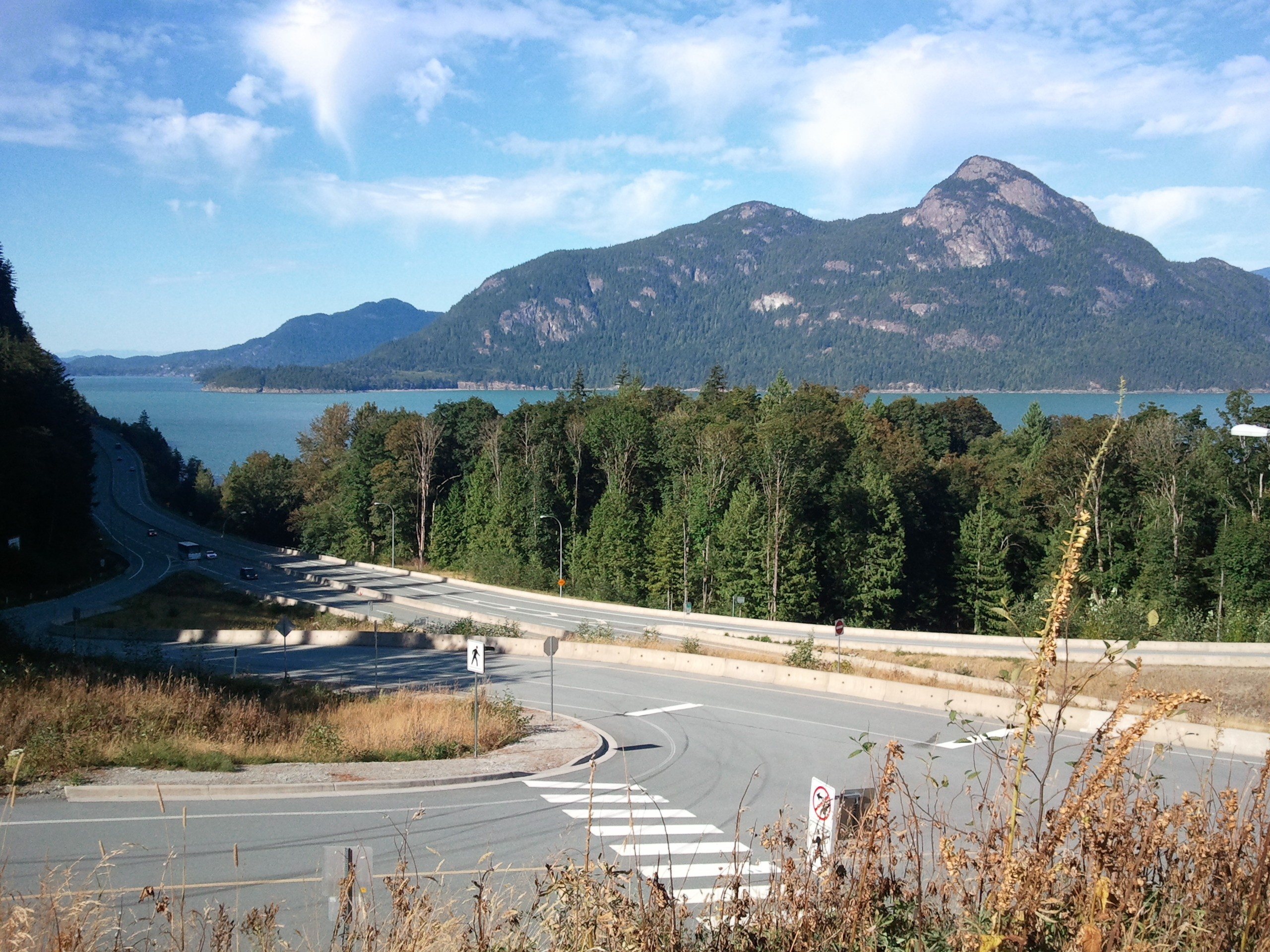
Highway 99 and Howe Sound as seen from Furry Creek

British Columbia Highway 99 (the Sea-to-Sky Highway, also known as the Squamish Highway) runs along the east shore of Howe Sound, linking the Lower Mainland to Lions Bay, Britannia Beach, and Squamish, where it then proceeds inland to Whistler and beyond. From 2007 to 2010, this highway was upgraded to what would ultimately become a mixture of four-lane divided sections, three lane sections with alternating passing lanes, and some improved two lane sections. The first section of Olympics-related improvements, between Horseshoe Bay and Lions Bay, opened in December 2005. Before the improvements the highway was thought to be treacherous and was primary used by residents, commercial traffic and people traveling to ski mountains in the winter. Now, the Sea-to-Sky Highway is also used by a variety of tourists and adventure seekers throughout the year. Also following the east shore, and built before and below the highway, is the former British Columbia Railway (BCR) which was leased in 2004 by the provincial government to the Canadian National Railway. The Pacific Great Eastern Railway (which became the BCR) between Squamish and Lillooet was constructed 1912–16, and Squamish became a busy place as a rail-port for freight and also burgeoning passenger traffic as lodges up the rail line became popular with weekenders from the city, who reached the railway via the MV Britannia. Railway connections to North Vancouver were completed in the 1950s, with a highway built in the later 1960s that was the precursor to today's Sea-to-Sky Highway.

BC Ferries runs regularly scheduled ferry service between Horseshoe Bay and Langdale and between Horseshoe Bay and Snug Cove on Bowen Island. They also run a foot-passenger-only ferry that serves New Brighton on Gambier Island and Keats Landing and Eastbourne settlements on Keats Island from the Langdale ferry terminal near Gibsons, an easy transfer from the ferry from Horseshoe Bay to Langdale. There is also private water taxi service from Horseshoe Bay and Langdale to Bowen Island, Gambier Island and Keats Island.

== Communities ==
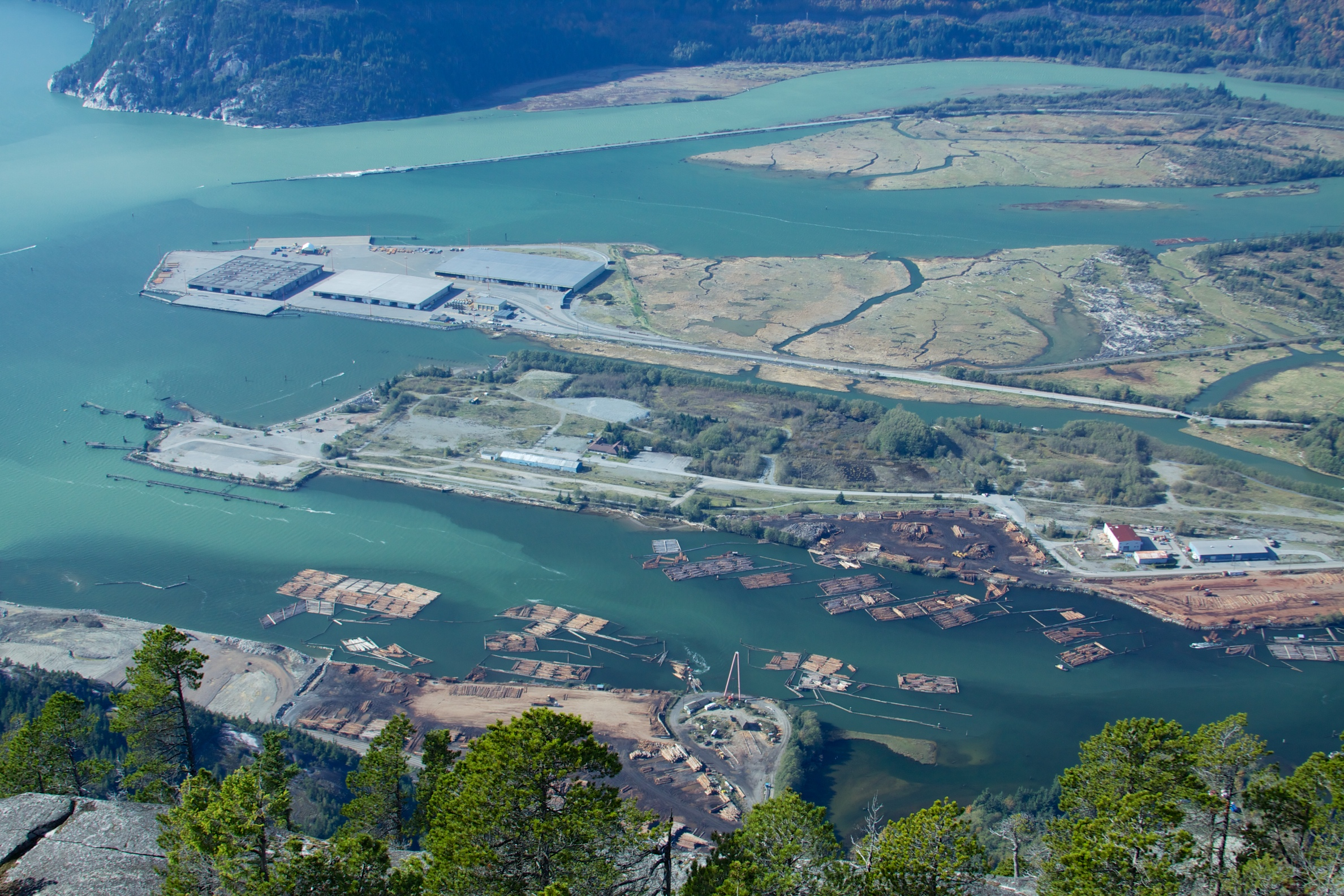
Port of Squamish as seen from Stawamus Chief

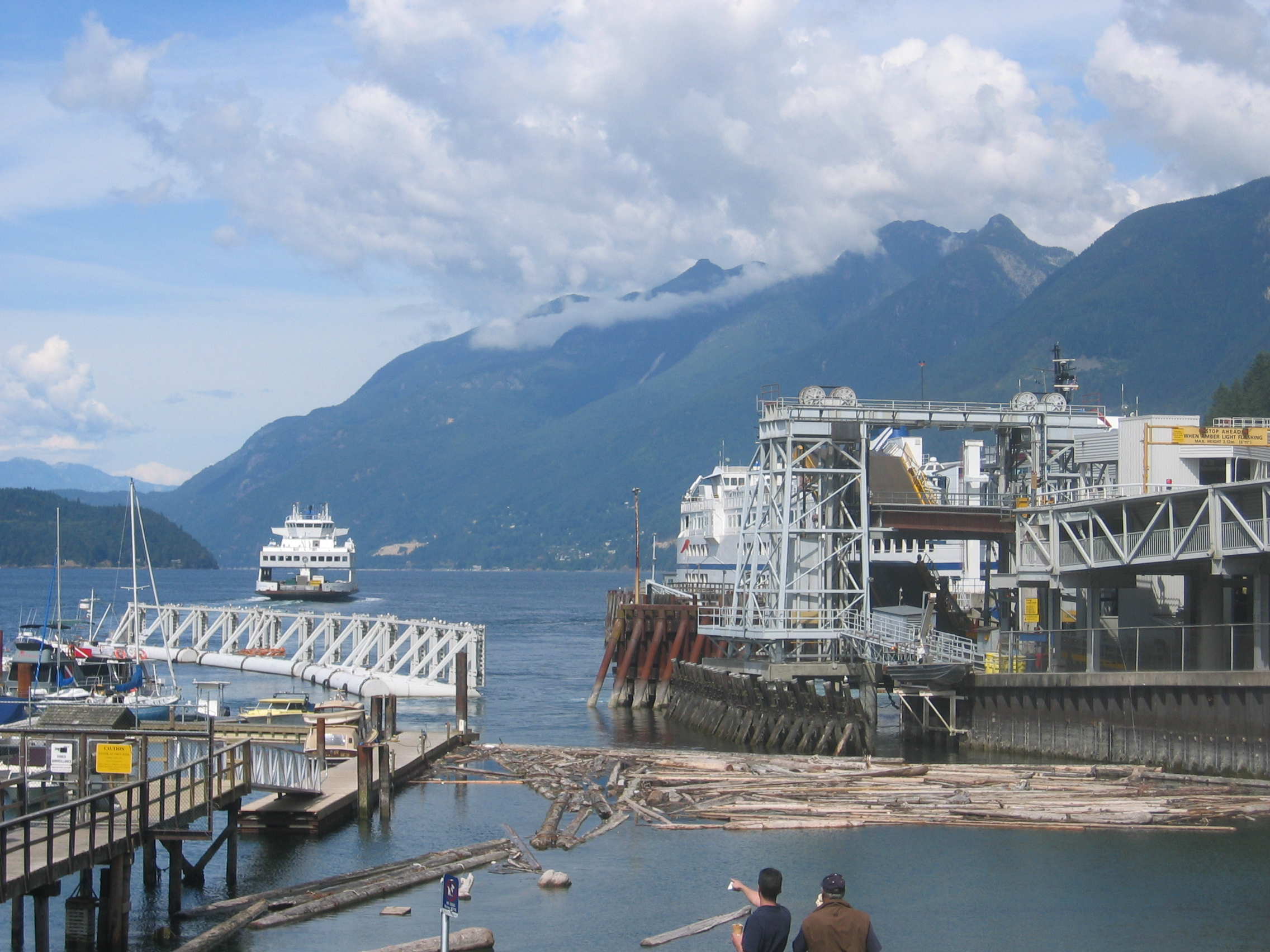
Ferry departing Horseshoe Bay terminal in West Vancouver

Squamish is a minor deepwater port. It was the original southern terminus of the BCR in the days when it was the Pacific Great Eastern, and had a busy ferry terminal where travellers would disembark from ferries and steamers bringing them in from Vancouver Harbour. In the 1960s what was then called the Squamish Highway was finally pushed through from Vancouver. This made the former steamer service unnecessary. Once a thriving forestry town, with recent cutbacks in logging along with the closure and dismantling of a major sawmill in 2004, Squamish has become a tourist destination and a commuter community for workers in nearby Whistler and Vancouver. The closure of the Woodfibre pulp mill in 2006 signalled an end to the resource-based economy here. Squamish is a world centre for rock climbing, with the 700 m (2,300 ft) bulk of the Stawamus Chief, a huge rock formation always busy with climbers, along with other formations overlooking downtown and the head of Howe Sound. In addition, the strong winds and flat waters at the upper end of Howe Sound have made Squamish a mecca for windsurfers, kite boarders and keelboat sailors.

Just south of town along Highway 99 is Shannon Falls, a tourist attraction and provincial park, and Darrell Bay, which is the ferry dock for service to the former pulp mill at Woodfibre, across the sound. Woodfibre has no road access. From the early 1900s until 1973 there was a small company town surrounding the mill where most employees lived. By 1975 all employees had relocated, mostly to Squamish, and the town was dismantled. Over the next 30 years the mill slowly expanded into the former townsite, but it closed in early 2006.

Porteau Cove is a provincial campsite and also a location for scuba diving, as artificial reefs have been sunk in the area. The bluffs above the highway in this area are one of the main avalanche hazards to both the highway and the rail line, which are squeezed together between the foot of the bluffs and the shoreline.

Furry Creek is the location of a new upscale golf course and resort development. Proposals have called for a new highway from Vancouver via the Capilano River watershed would emerge on Highway 99 at Furry Creek. However, the fact that this route traverses the Lower Mainland's Capilano watershed creates nearly insurmountable political obstacles to its construction.

Lions Bay is a small residential community, incorporated as a village, climbing the mountainside from Howe Sound up to the west peak of the pair of summits known as The Lions, which overlook Vancouver on the other side.

Near Squamish is Britannia Beach, the former gold and copper mining town and port with some highway-based eateries and stores. Its name does not come directly from associations with Britain, but from the MV Britannia, the old Vancouver-Squamish steamer (a new MV Britannia built in 1983 is in use as a tourboat based in Coal Harbour, Vancouver). Today the mine mill site is the Britannia Mine Museum, with mine shaft tours, gold panning, etc. The prominent multi-story mine building underwent a restoration with the replacement of hundreds of window panes. The former mine site is also frequently used as a shooting site for a variety of TV and movie productions, including for The X-Files TV series.

Horseshoe Bay is a residential and commercial district of West Vancouver on the southern edge of the Sea-to-Sky Highway. The highway clings to the cliffside above the BC Ferries terminal at Horseshoe Bay. Restaurants, tourist shops and galleries, a pub or two and recreational marinas are also situated in the community. Ferries from Horseshoe Bay go to Departure Bay in Nanaimo on Vancouver Island, Bowen Island, and Langdale on the Sunshine Coast, which is the ferry terminal for the southern Sunshine Coast.

The peninsula southwest of Horseshoe Bay terminates at Whytecliffe, an upscale residential area and public park, which is the southern point of Howe Sound's east shore. South of here is the entrance of English Bay and Burrard Inlet. Also in the vicinity of Howe Sound's mouth, at Point Atkinson is Lighthouse Park.

Just north of Langdale is Port Mellon, another pulp and paper mill somewhat larger than Woodfibre. Port Mellon, which, unlike Woodfibre, produces paper and pulp (and is serviced by road from Gibsons/Langdale) is one of the oldest operating mills in B.C. Woodfibre's closure included measures securing the fibre supply for Port Mellon, making its future considerably more secure.

At the southwest "corner" of Howe Sound, just a few kilometres south of the Langdale Ferry terminal is the town of Gibsons. Gibsons is perhaps best known as the locale for the former CBC Television series The Beachcombers. The restaurant featured in the series, Molly's Reach, remains open for business.

== See also ==
- The Barrier
- Gulf Islands
- Queen Charlotte Channel
