= Squamish Nation =

First Nation government in British Columbia, Canada

- Band No. 555
- Sḵwx̱wú7mesh Úxwumixw
- A map showing traditional Squamish territory, totalling 6,732 km^{2} (2,599 sq mi)
- People: Squamish people
- Headquarters: North Vancouver
- Province: British Columbia

Land
- Other reserves: List: Kitsilano 6; Mission 1; Seymour Creek 2; Capilano 5; Skowishin 7; Skowishin Graveyard 10; Chukchuk 8; Poyam 9; Cheakamus 11; Yookwitz 12; Poquiosin & Skamain 13; Waiwakum 14; Aikwucks 15; Seaichem 16; Kowtain 17; Yekwaupsum 18; Yekwaupsum 19; Stawamus 24; Kaikalahun 25; Chekwelp 26; Chekwelp 26A; Schaltuuch 27; Defence Island 28; Kwum Kwum
- Land area: 21.19 km^{2} (8.18 sq mi)

Population (2024)
- On reserve: 2187
- On other land: 187
- Off reserve: 2265
- Total population: 4639

Government
- Council: List: Stewart "Sempúlyan" Gonzales; Shayla "Sumkwaht" Jacobs; Khelsilem; Kristen "Tiyáltelut" Rivers; Ann "Syexwáliya" Whonnock; Joyce Williams; Wilson "Sxwíxwtn" Williams; Richard "Xwélxwelacha" Williams

Website
- www.squamish.net

Squamish Nation, Sḵwx̱wú7mesh Úxwumixw, is the First Nations government of the Squamish people. Squamish Nation is composed of 26 First Nations reserves located around the Capilano River, Mosquito Creek, and Seymour River on the north shore of Burrard Inlet in North Vancouver, British Columbia, and along the Squamish River, and in Gibsons and Port Mellon in the Howe Sound. They also jointly own private land holdings with neighbouring First Nations like the Musqueam, Tsleil-Waututh, and Lil’wat.

The Squamish Nation government comprises an elected council, which includes the Council Chairperson, seven elected Councillors, and an elected Band Manager. The Council hires, oversees and provides direction to the Chief Administrative Officer who oversees the administrative arm of Squamish Nation. It is based primarily in West Vancouver, North Vancouver, and Squamish, British Columbia. Its government is responsible for managing assets and revenues generated by Squamish Nation, providing several programs and services to the Squamish people, and representing the Squamish people in intergovernmental relations with other Canadian governments and industries that operate within its territory.

== History ==
=== Early history ===
Squamish Nation was formed in July 1923 when several separate First Nations (at the time called Indian Bands) were amalgamated under Section 17 of the Indian Act. All of the First Nations that amalgamated were communities largely considered and identified as Squamish People but resided on different First Nation reserve lands throughout the Squamish Valley, Burrard Inlet, and False Creek of Vancouver.

Two years of community meetings were held, with eventually a super-majority of eligible voters for the various First Nations voting to petition the Federal Department responsible for Indians to amalgamate the several First Nations into a single entity they called Squamish Nation. Their petition called for a Council to represent the newly created Squamish Nation, all lands joined as Squamish Nation lands, and all trust accounts to be put into a single trust account. Approximately CA$167,740 (equivalent to $2,993,794 in 2025) was consolidated into a single trust account for the newly formed Squamish Nation.

=== Recent History ===
After decades of litigation began in 1977, the Squamish Nation reclaimed part of Sen̓áḵw (Kitsilano Reserve No. 6) at False Creek in Vancouver, land from which its members had been illegally removed in 1913. Court rulings in the early 2000s returned ~10.5 acres of land️ to the Nation.

Prior to British Columbia's hosting of the 2010 Olympic Games, the Squamish Nation engaged in negotiations with the Provincial Government of British Columbia and Lil'wat First Nation. Numerous agreements were signed prior to and following the announcement of the host city for the Games, regarding issues such as Squamish land to be used for hosting the Games. The Nation was one of the Four Host First Nations, alongside the Musqueam, Tsleil-Waututh, and Lil'wat, that co-hosted the 2010 Winter Olympics in Vancouver and Whistler.

In 2017, the Squamish Nation alongside the Tsleil-Waututh Nation, who reside further east on Burrard Inlet and to the Musqueam First Nation who reside on the southern edge of the city of Vancouver formed the MST Development Corporation in 2017 in order to co-own and develop properties across the lower mainland together.

In 2019, Squamish Nation members voted to develop the reclaimed Sen̓áḵw lands, launching what has become one of the largest Indigenous-led housing developments in Canada.

== Government ==
The elected councillors make up the executive political body of this government. They operate on a four-year term with elections occurring around in December. They also elect a band manager. The most recent Council was elected September 28, 2025.

- Sxwíxwtn, Wilson Williams (Chairperson)
- Alroy (Bucky) Baker
- Yul Baker
- Jody Broomfield
- Jonah Trevon Chase Gonzales
- Faye Halls
- Matthew Houghton
- Sumkwaht, Shayla Jacobs
- Anthony Joseph
- Bertha Joseph
- Sandy Lafontaine
- Kalkalilh, Deanna Lewis
- Sxwchálten, Kevin Rivers
- Syexwáliya, Ann Whonnock
- Amanda Williams
- Jonny Williams

The elected Band Manager is Tsunaxen, Willie Lewis.

== Lands ==
=== Existing reserves ===
Indian reserves under the administration of Squamish Nation:

Squamish Nation reserves
| Reserve | Squamish name | Location description | Area | Coordinates | Reference |
|---|---|---|---|---|---|
| Kitsilano Indian Reserve No. 6 | Squamish: Sen̓áḵw | In the City of Vancouver, near English Bay, on the south side of the mouth of False Creek | 4.4 ha | 49°16′26″N 123°08′32″W | |
| Mission Indian Reserve No. 1 | Squamish: Slhá7an̓ | North shore of Burrard Inlet on Wagg and Mosquito Creeks, bounded on the north and east by the City of North Vancouver | 59.6 ha | 49°19′00″N 123°06′00″W | |
| Seymour Creek Indian Reserve No. 2 | Squamish: Ch'ich'éx̱wí7ḵw | North shore of Burrard Inlet, on right bank of Seymour Creek, near the mouth of Second Narrows | 45.5 ha | 49°18′00″N 123°02′00″W | |
| Capilano Indian Reserve No. 5 | Squamish: Xwmelch'stn | North shore of Burrard Inlet at First Narrows, north end of Lions Gate Bridge | 155.6 ha | 49°19′00″N 123°08′00″W | |
| Skowishin Indian Reserve No. 7 | Squamish: Skawshn | Left bank of the Squamish River | 29.6 ha | 49°56′00″N 123°18′00″W | |
| Skowishin Graveyard Indian Reserve No. 10 | | Left bank of the Squamish River near the mouth of Ashlu Creek | 0.40 ha | 49.9090097428499°N 123.29323705526882°W | |
| Chukchuk Indian Reserve No. 8 | Squamish: Ch’eḵ’ch’eḵ’ts | | 0.1 ha | 49.97359296702315°N 123.30573946023652°W | |
| Poyam Indian Reserve No. 9 | Squamish: P'uy̓ám̓ | Left bank of the Squamish River | 0.3 ha | 49.98992070962588°N 123.324621110448°W | |
| Cheakamus Indian Reserve No. 11 | Squamish: Xwakw’áyak’in | At and to the north of the junction of the Squamish and Cheakamus Rivers | 1639.4 ha | 49°48′00″N 123°11′00″W | |
| Yookwitz Indian Reserve No. 12 | Squamish: Yewk’ts | Right bank of the Squamish River, opposite mouth of the Cheakamus River | 9.3 ha | 49°47′00″N 123°12′00″W | |
| Poquiosin & Skamain Indian Reserve No. 13 | Squamish: Pukway̓úsm-Skemín | Left bank of the Squamish River at the mouth of the Cheakamus River | 45.2 ha | 49°47′00″N 123°10′00″W | |
| Waiwakum Indian Reserve No. 14 | Squamish: Wiwḵ’m | Left bank of the Squamish River 2 miles below the mouth of the Cheakamus River | 15.0 ha | 49°46′00″N 123°10′00″W | |
| Aikwucks Indian Reserve No. 15 | | Left bank of the Squamish River | 11.1 ha | 49°46′00″N 123°10′00″W | |
| Seaichem Indian Reserve No. 16 | Squamish: Siyích’m | East bank of Kowtain Slough of the Squamish River, 3 miles below the mouth of the Cheakamus River | 27.5 ha | 49°45′00″N 123°08′00″W | |
| Kowtain Indian Reserve No. 17 | Squamish: Kaw̓tín | Left bank of Kowtain Slough of the Squamish River, 4 miles from the river mouth on Howe Sound | 20.8 ha | 49°44′00″N 123°08′00″W | |
| Yekwaupsum Indian Reserve No. 18 | Squamish: Yekw’ápsm | Near left bank of the Squamish River, 3 miles from its mouth on Howe Sound | 2 ha | 49°43′00″N 123°09′00″W | |
| Yekwaupsum Indian Reserve No. 19 | Squamish: Pn’p’áni | Right bank of the Squamish River, 3 miles north of its mouth on Howe Sound | 1 ha | 49°44′00″N 123°09′00″W | |
| Stawamus Indian Reserve No. 24 | Squamish: St’á7mes | At the mouth of the Stawamus River at the head of Howe Sound, 1 mile southeast of downtown Squamish | 22.1 ha | 49°41′00″N 123°09′00″W | |
| Kaikalahun Indian Reserve No. 25 | Squamish: Ḵ’iḵ’élx̱n | West shore of Howe Sound south of Port Mellon | 11.5 ha | 49°31′00″N 123°29′00″W | |
| Chekwelp Indian Reserve No. 26 | Squamish: Ch’ḵw’elhp | West shore of Howe Sound, to the west of Keats Island | 11.3 ha | 49°25′00″N 123°30′00″W | |
| Chekwelp Indian Reserve No. 26A | | West shore of Howe Sound northwest of Keats Island | 0.2 ha | 49°25′00″N 123°29′00″W | |
| Schaltuuch Indian Reserve No. 27 | Squamish: Ch’ḵw’elhp | On a small island north of Shelter Island in Shoal Channel of Howe Sound, west of Keats Island | 5 ha | 49°24′00″N 123°29′00″W | |
| Defence Island Indian Reserve No. 28 | Squamish: Nínich Ḵw’émḵw’em | In Howe Sound, northeast from Anvil Island (Hat Island), the easterly of two islands called Defence Islands | 1.7 ha | 49°35′00″N 123°16′00″W | |
| Kwum Kwum Indian Reserve | Squamish: Ḵw’émḵw’em | The westerly of the two Defence Islands northeast of Anvil Island | 6.20 ha | 49°35′00″N 123°17′00″W | |

=== Treaty negotiations ===
The Squamish Nation is currently in stage 3 of the BC Treaty Process but negotiations have not proceeded further in recent years.

== Economic and resource development ==
The Squamish Nation owns land in the Lower Mainland in areas that have some of the highest real estate values in the province. Some of these lands and properties are leased out with rents returning to the Squamish Nation. Additional revenues are earned through businesses owned by the Squamish Nation, such as marinas, a driving range and a gas bar. Digital billboards have been erected on Squamish Nation lands in North Vancouver, West Vancouver, Vancouver and Squamish, including at the approaches to Vancouver's Burrard Street Bridge, Lions Gate Bridge and Ironworkers Memorial Second Narrows Crossing. The advertising contract for these billboards was projected to bring approximately $60 million in revenue to the Squamish Nation over three decades.

In February 2010, the Chances Squamish community gaming centre opened on Squamish Nation land beside Highway 99, timed to coincide with the 2010 Winter Olympics. The Nation developed the facility in partnership with the British Columbia Lottery Corporation and Boardwalk Gaming.

The Squamish Nation, the Lil’wat Nation, Bell Canada and the province of BC joined in the development of the Aboriginal Cultural Centre and Museum in Whistler BC.

The purchase of a Tree Farm Licence (License 38) by the Nation generated public protest.

In recent years the Squamish Nation has been involved in energy development, including the development of private hydro power projects on public rivers, including the Furry Creek and Ashlu hydro projects. It takes a share of the private revenue scheme developed by the BC Liberal Government under Gordon Campbell in a closed-door policy called the BC Energy Plan.

=== 2010 Olympic Games ===
The Squamish Nation joined with the Musqueam, Tsleil-Waututh, and Lil'wat through the Four Host First Nations Society to coordinate with the Vancouver Organizing Committee (VANOC), representing their interests in preparation for the 2010 Winter Olympics. These 'Four Host First Nations' shared in hosting the 2010 Olympic Games in Vancouver. Fourteen of the 20 Olympic and Paralympic events took place in the Nation's shared territories, primarily in and around Whistler, BC.

=== Social, educational and cultural programs and facilities ===
In July 2008, the Squamish Nation partnered with their neighbours the Lil'wat First Nation to open the multimillion-dollar Squamish Lilwat Cultural Centre in Whistler. The two nations, whose territories traditionally overlapped around the Whistler area, had signed a Protocol Agreement in 2001 to work together on such opportunities. The centre features traditional art, cultural and historical displays, wood carvings, an 80-seat theatre, longhouse, pit-house, outdoor forest walk, cafe and gift shop.

== See also ==
- Squamish people
- Joe Capilano
- Squamish language
- Tsleil-Waututh First Nation
- History of Squamish and Tsleil-Waututh longshoremen, 1863-1963
