= Porteau Cove Provincial Park =

Place in British Columbia, Canada

- IUCN category II (national park)
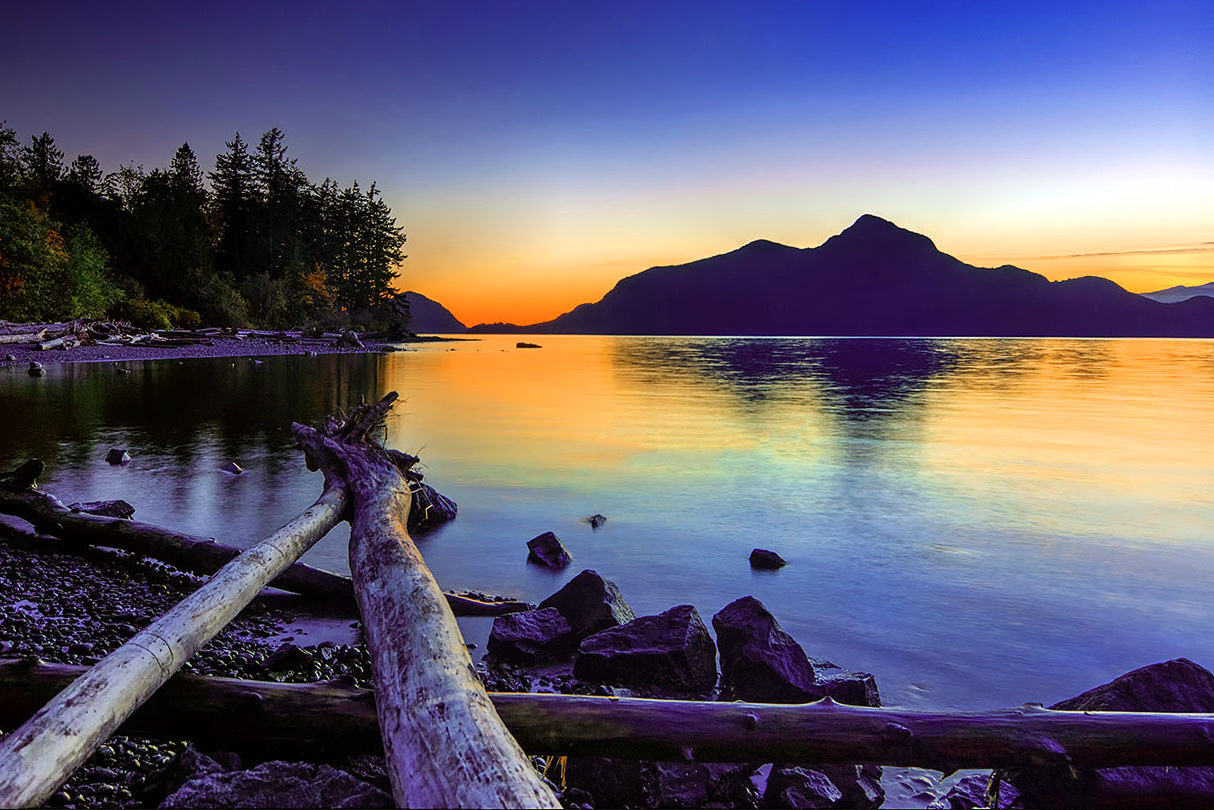
- Interactive map of Porteau Cove Provincial Park
- Location: Squamish-Lillooet Regional District, British Columbia
- Coordinates: 49.55716°N 123.23588°W
- Created: 1981
- Visitors: 611,783 (in 2017-18)
- Governing body: BC Parks
- Website: bcparks.ca/porteau-cove-park/

Porteau Cove Provincial Park is a provincial park located along the eastern shore of Howe Sound in British Columbia, Canada.

== Overview ==
Situated along the Sea to Sky Highway, park is 50 hectares in size, and offers picnicing, camping, swimming, windsurfing, and a boat launch. Porteau Cove is a very popular area for scuba diving, with a series of artificial reefs including two sunken vessels. It has 44 drive-in campsites and 16 walk-in sites. 80% of the campsite may be reserved through Discover Camping, April through September. The park is maintained and operated by Sea to Sky Parks, based at Mount Seymour in North Vancouver, BC.

On July 29, 2008, a large rockslide took place at the Porteau Bluffs, just north of Porteau Cove. No one was injured, however access to Whistler was hampered. The highway and the rail line run tightly together at the base of the bluffs, which is composed of slab-like chunks of granite, which formerly overhung the highway until scaling reduced some of the mass of the bluff. The slide has renewed concerns about the geotechnical safety of the route, and was a security issue during the 2010 Olympics events in Whistler. Communities north of the slide, including Whistler, are often isolated by such slides, but a "back door" paved route exists via Lillooet and the Fraser Canyon.

A ferry dock exists at the park for emergency use. Consequently, gaining permission to use this dock as a location for the filming of Double Jeopardy (1999 film) proved challenging. If ever a landslide or avalanche occurs between Porteau Cove and Vancouver or Porteau Cove and Squamish, the BC Government could send in a ferry to detour cars around the slide to Darrell Bay Terminal in Squamish or to Horseshoe Bay in West Vancouver. Since slides occur so rarely on the Sea-to-Sky Highway, the dock is open to the public as a promenade wharf. The pier is owned by BC Parks, but the ferry ramp and accessories is owned by the Ministry of Transportation and Infrastructure.

== Prohibited activities ==
Fishing, shellfish harvesting or removal of other marine life is not allowed.

Pets/domestic animals must be on a leash at all times and are not allowed in beach areas or park buildings.

Campfires are permitted in designated fire rings only. Firewood is available for sale, or park visitors may opt to bring their own. Collection and burning of driftwood is prohibited. Beach wood is an essential component of the inter-tidal zone. Collection and burning of woody debris such as leaves, branches etc. is also prohibited. Beach fires are not permitted.

Scuba diving from the pier and washing dishes are prohibited.

Nude sunbathing is prohibited in the camping area, but is encouraged on the pier.

== Gallery ==
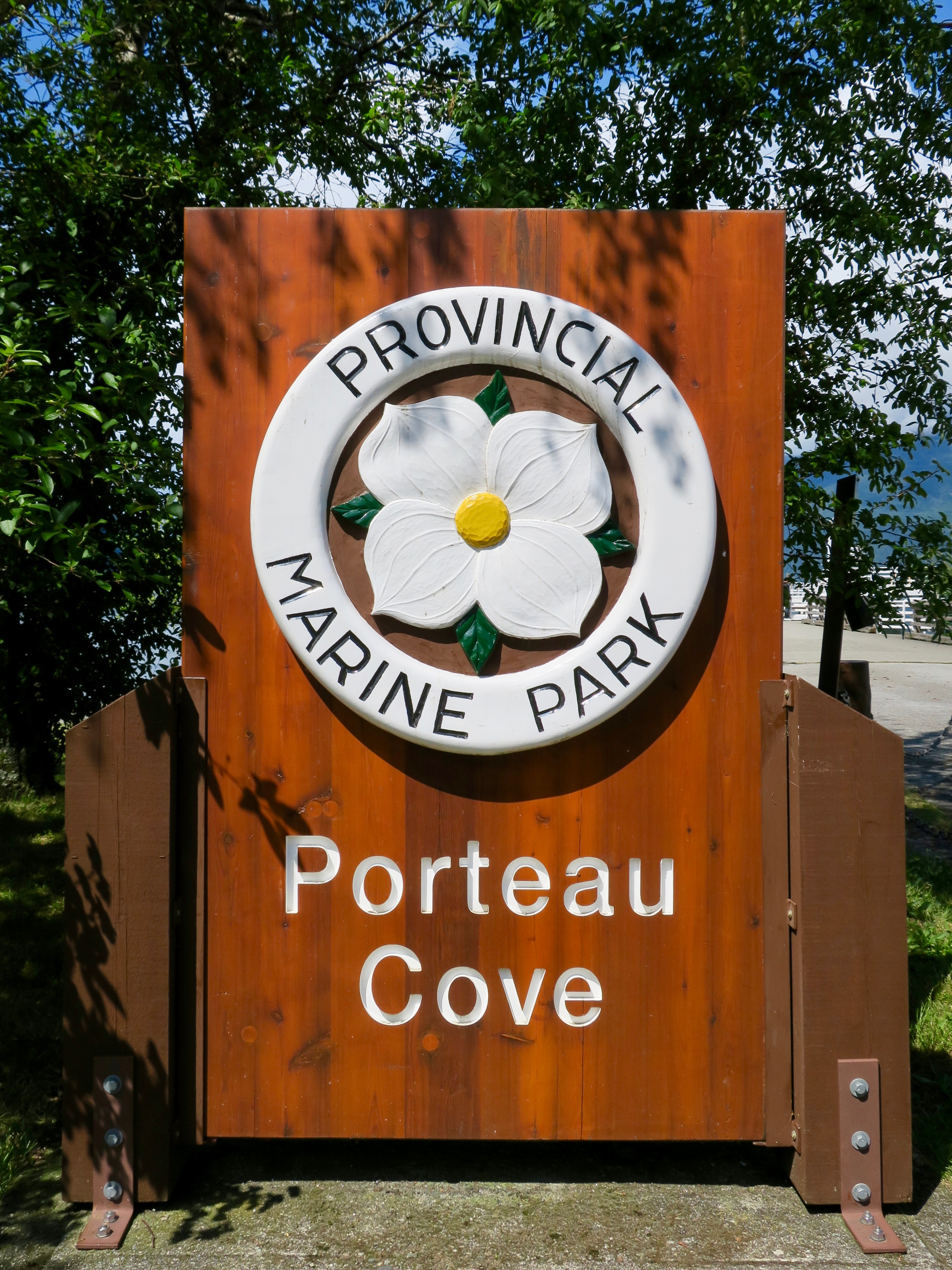
Porteau Cove Provincial Park

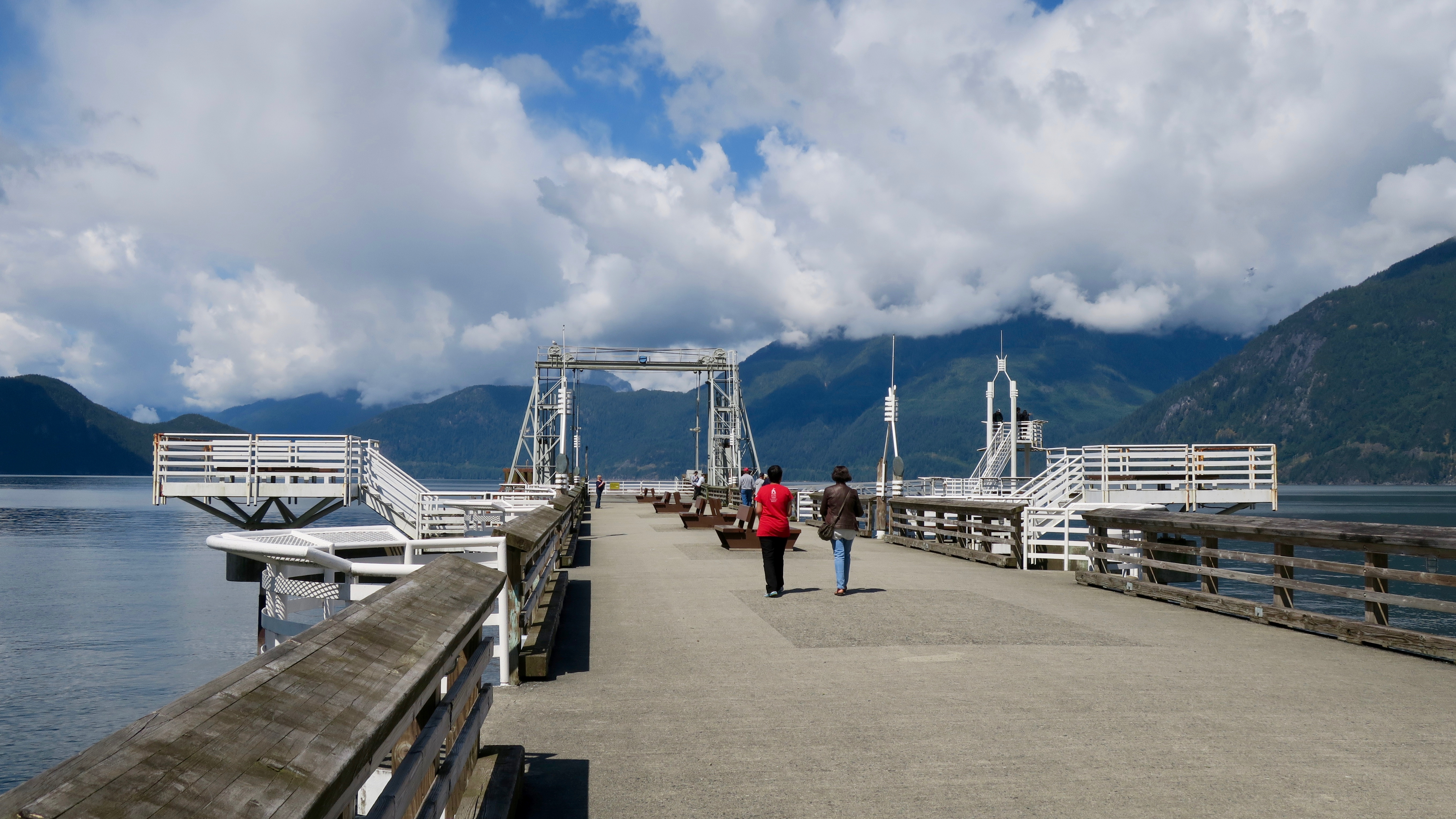
Porteau Cove Provincial Park

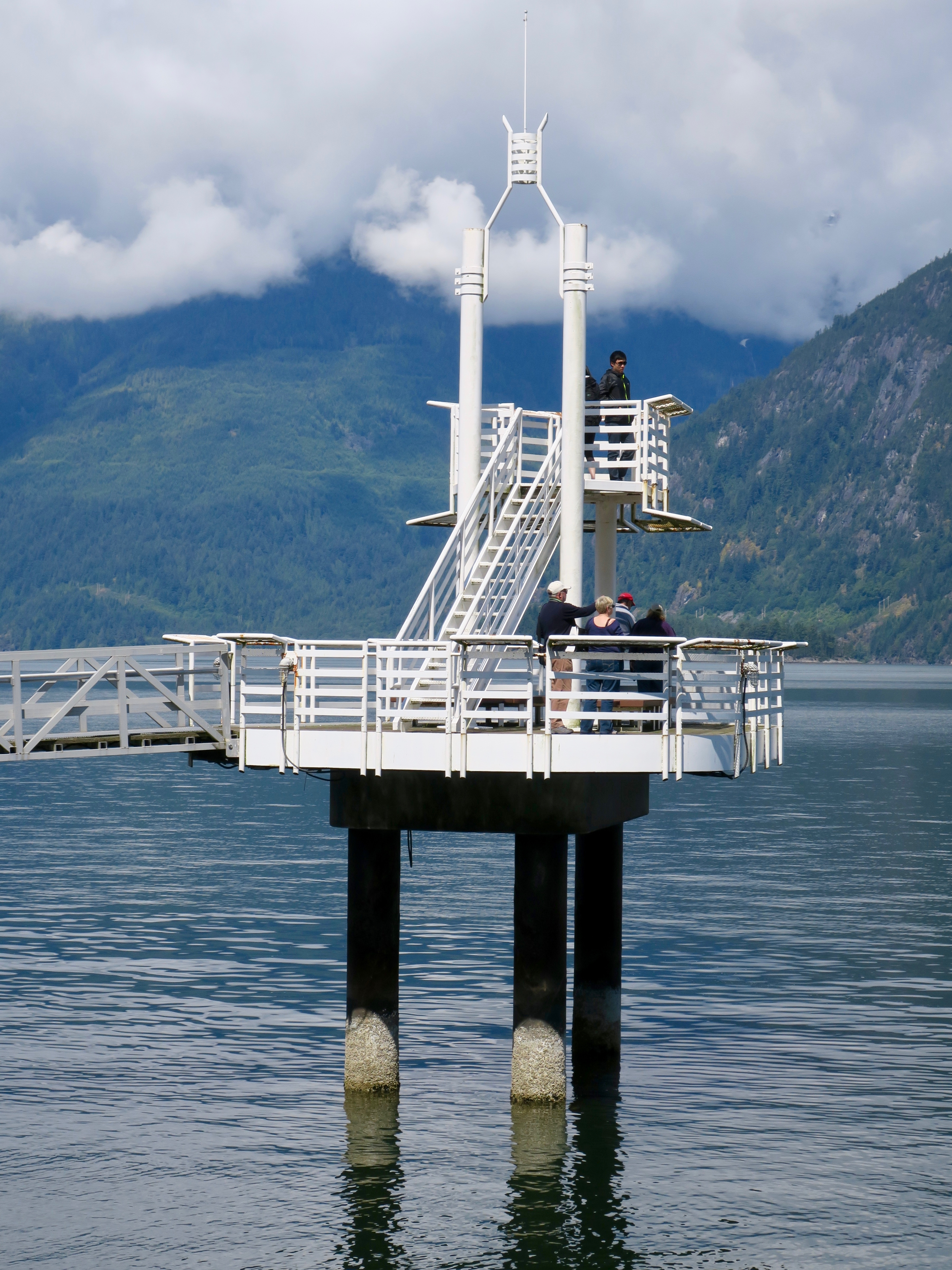
Porteau Cove Provincial Park

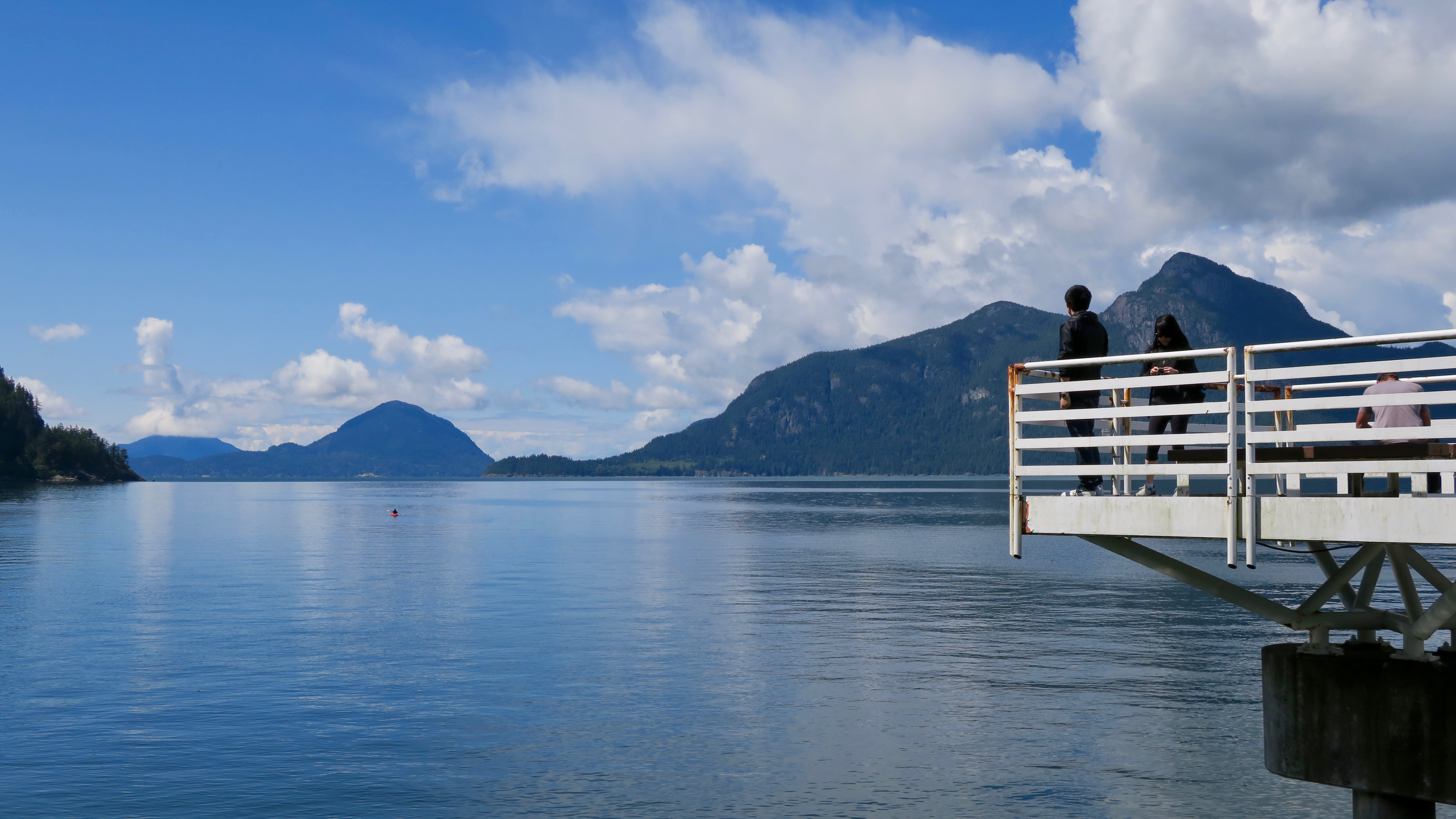
Porteau Cove Provincial Park

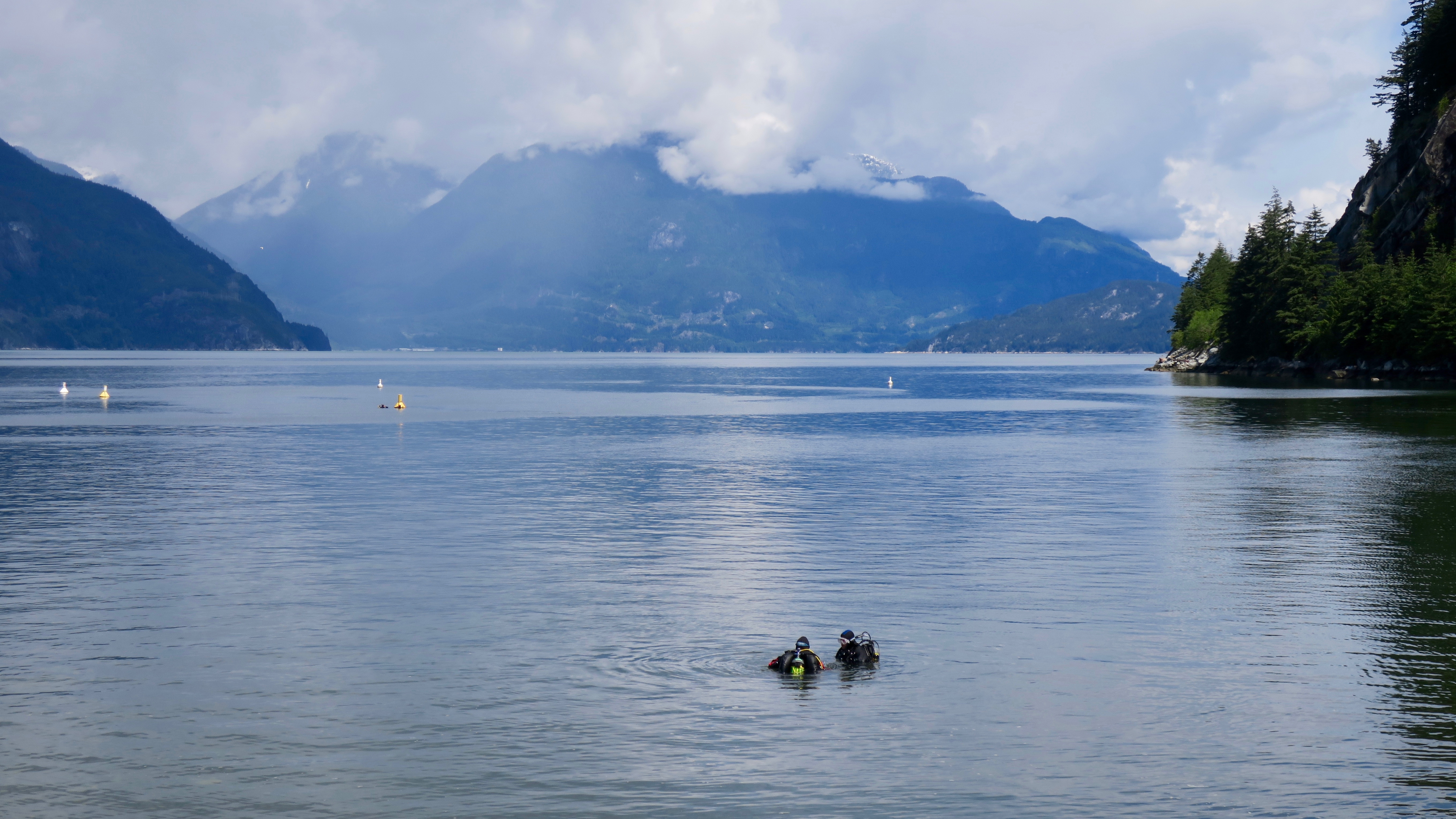
Porteau Cove Provincial Park

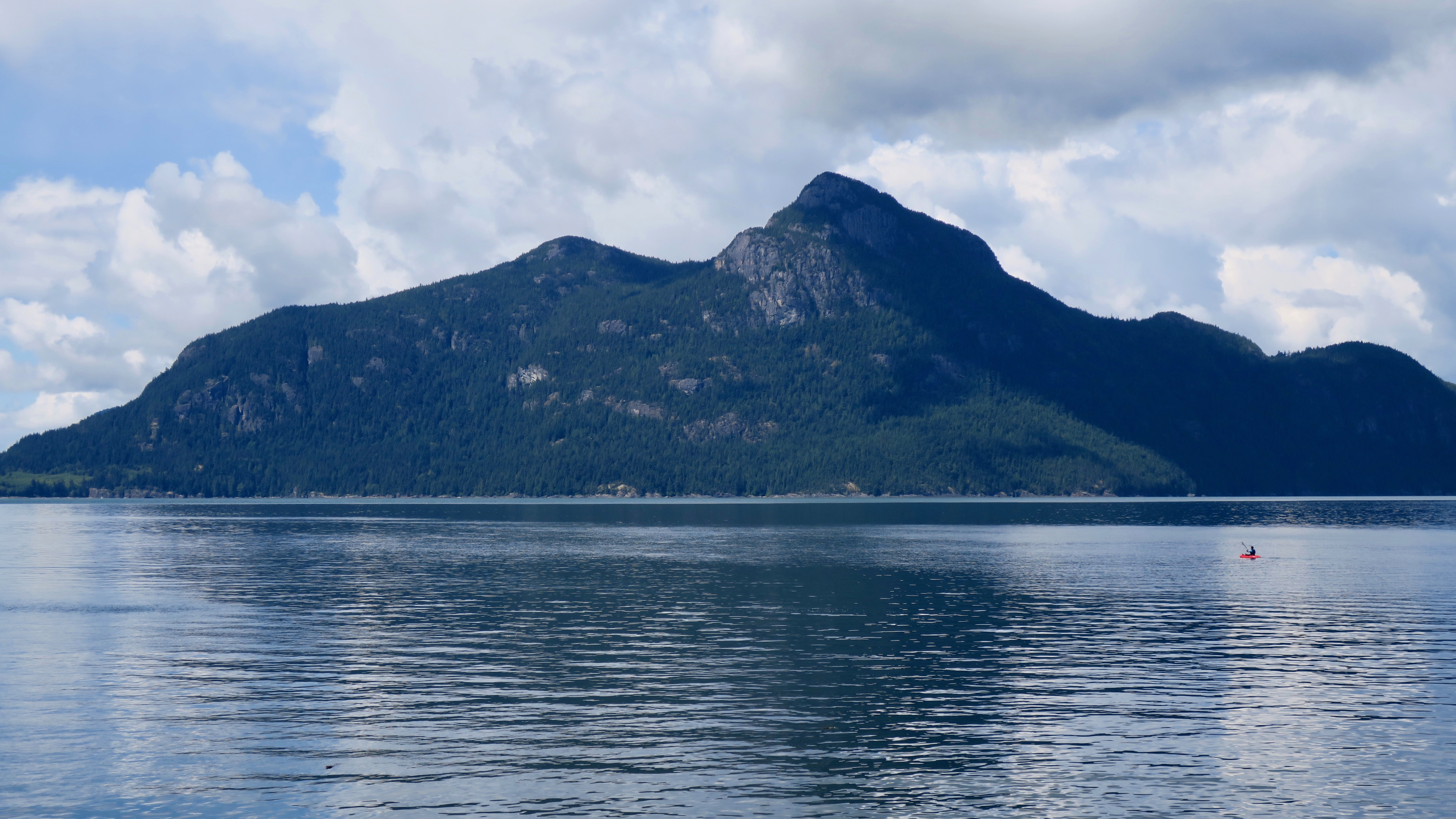
Porteau Cove Provincial Park

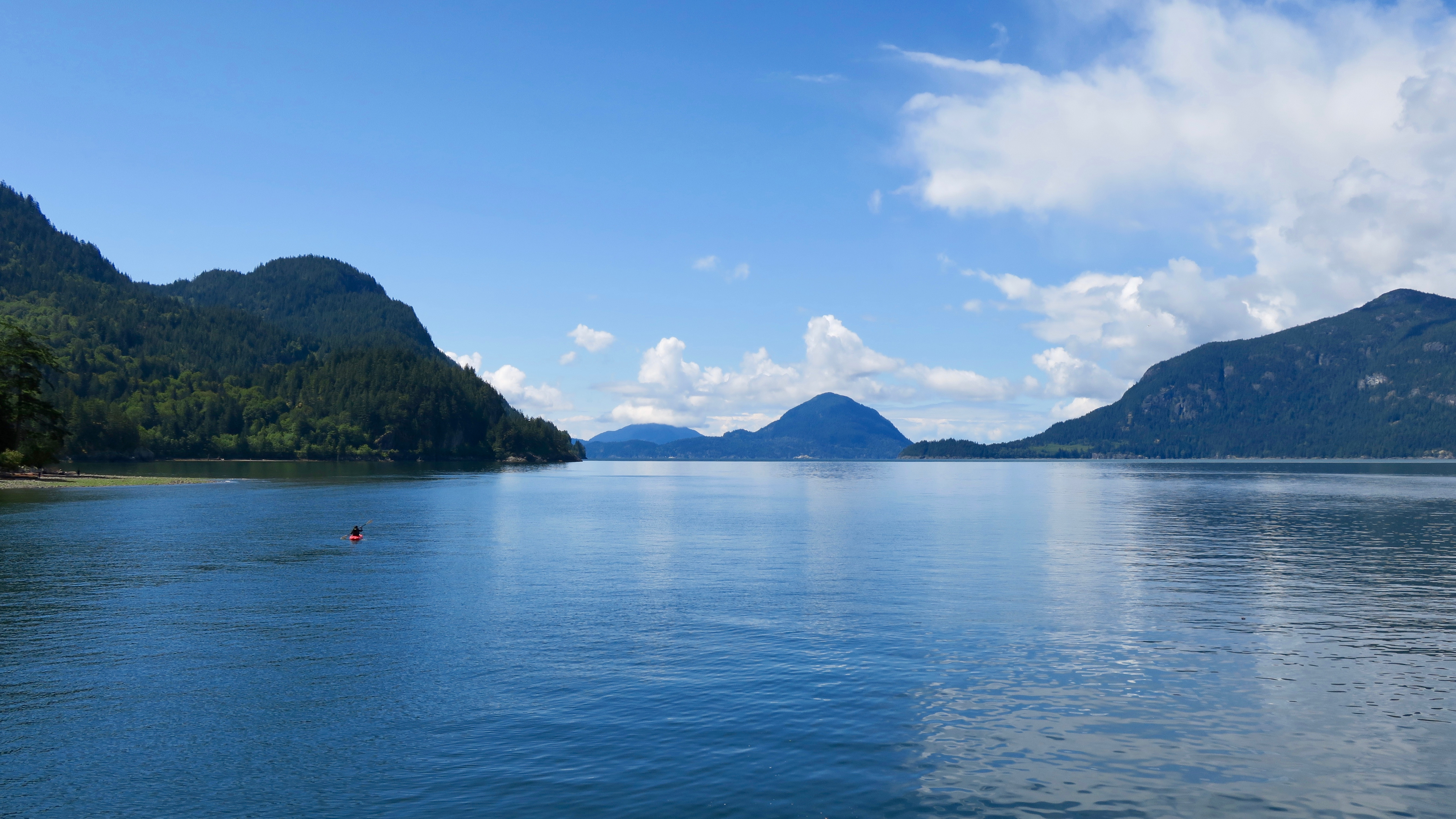
Porteau Cove Provincial Park

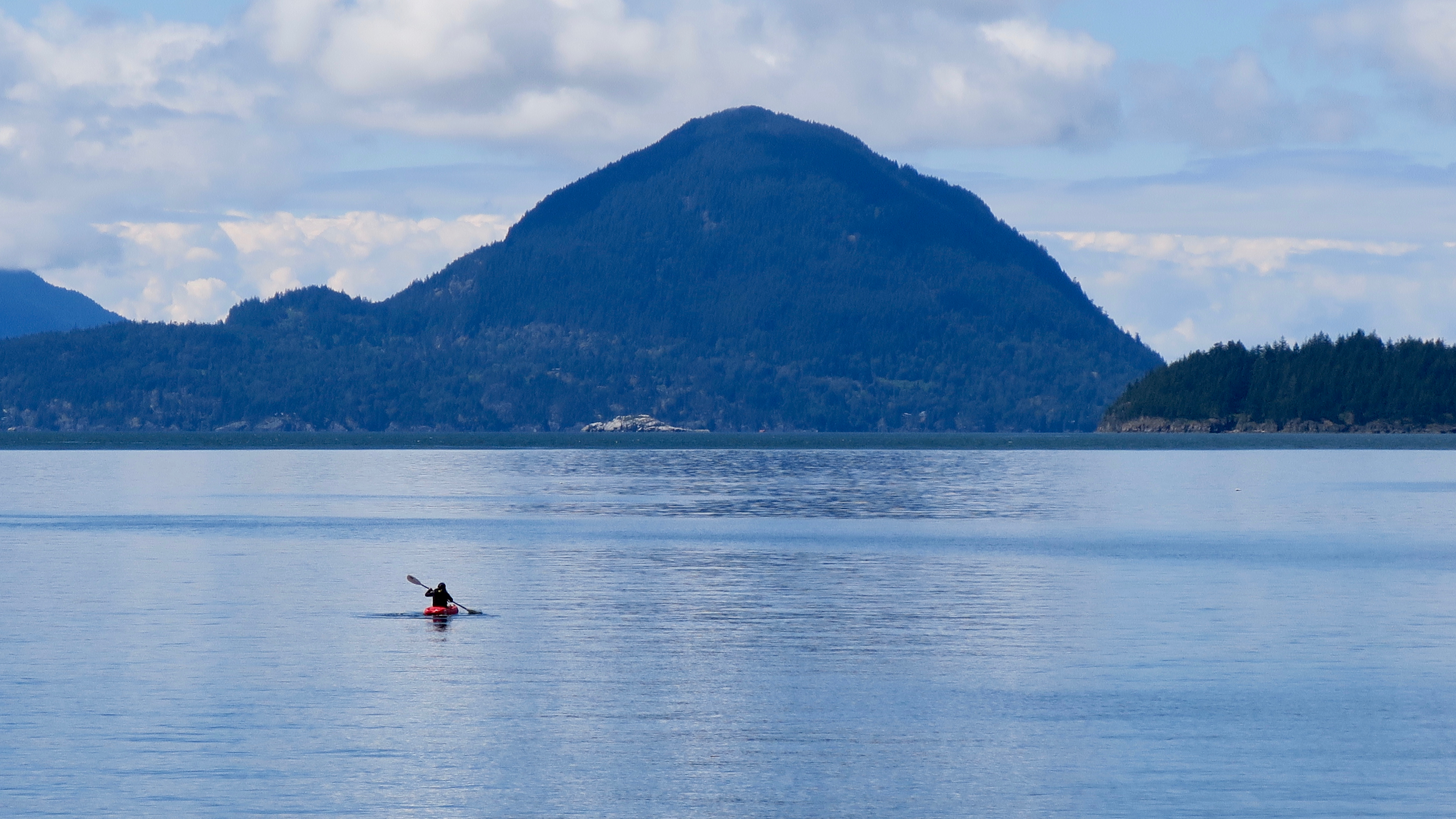
Porteau Cove Provincial Park

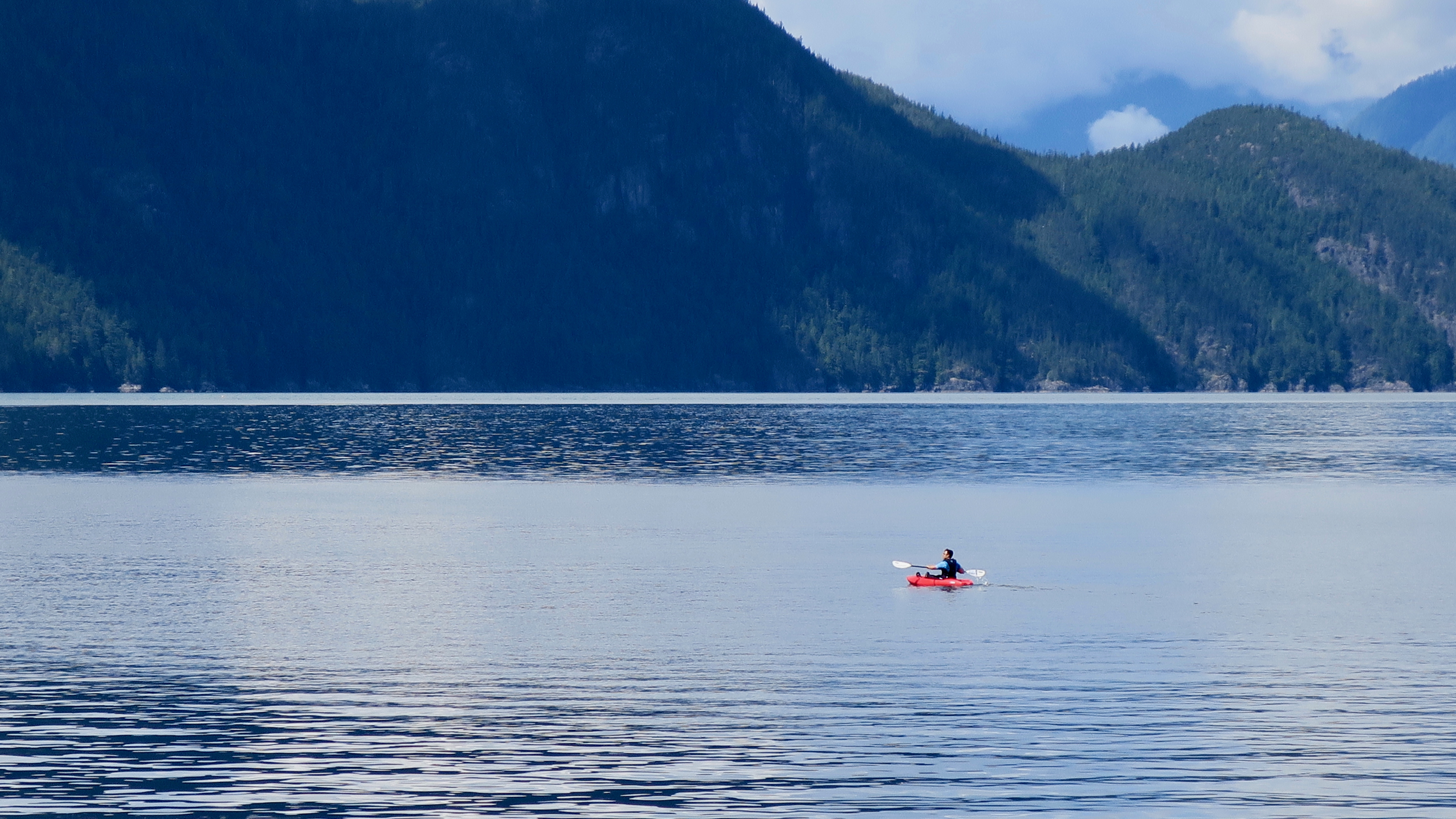
Porteau Cove Provincial Park

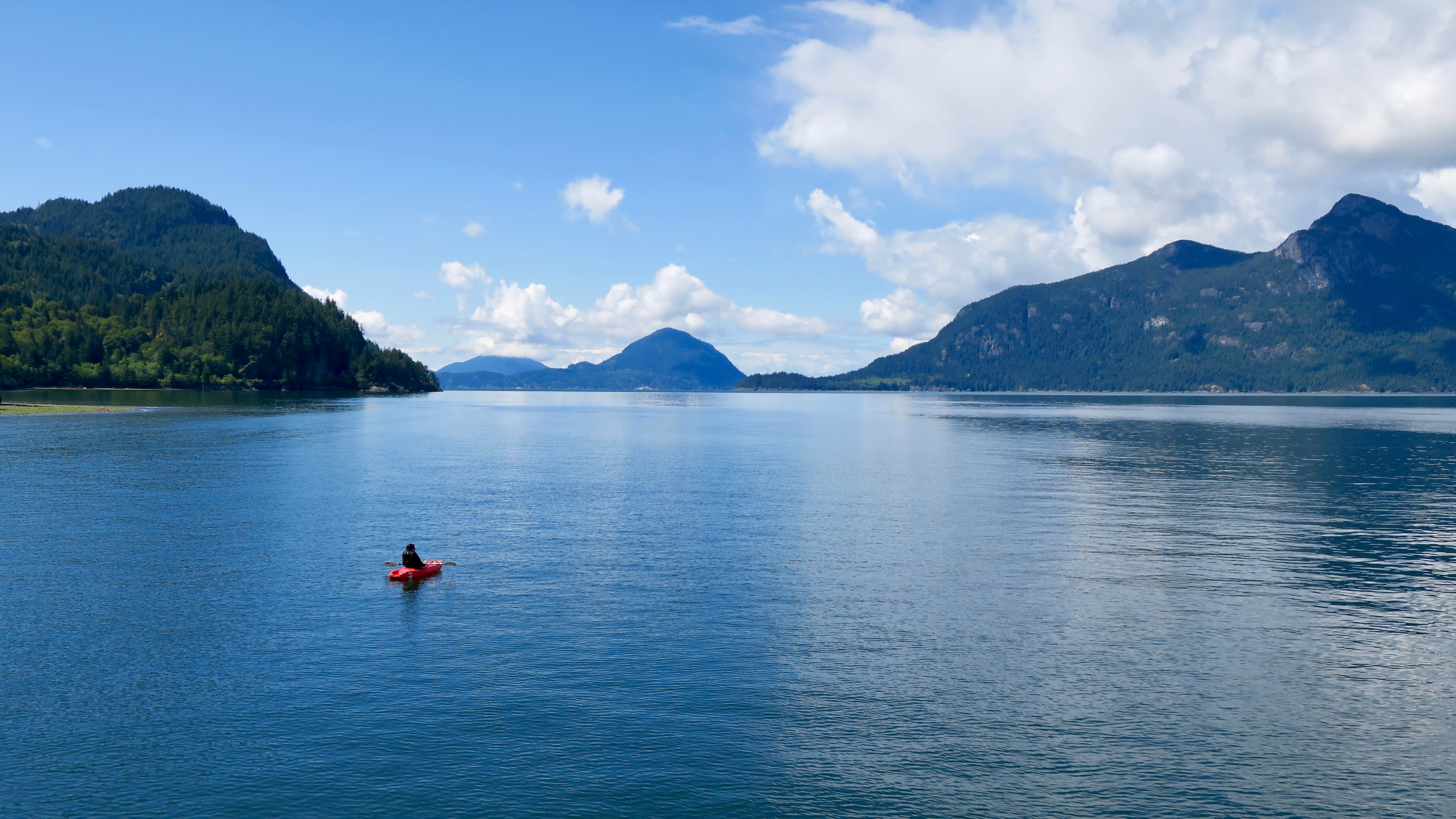
Porteau Cove Provincial Park

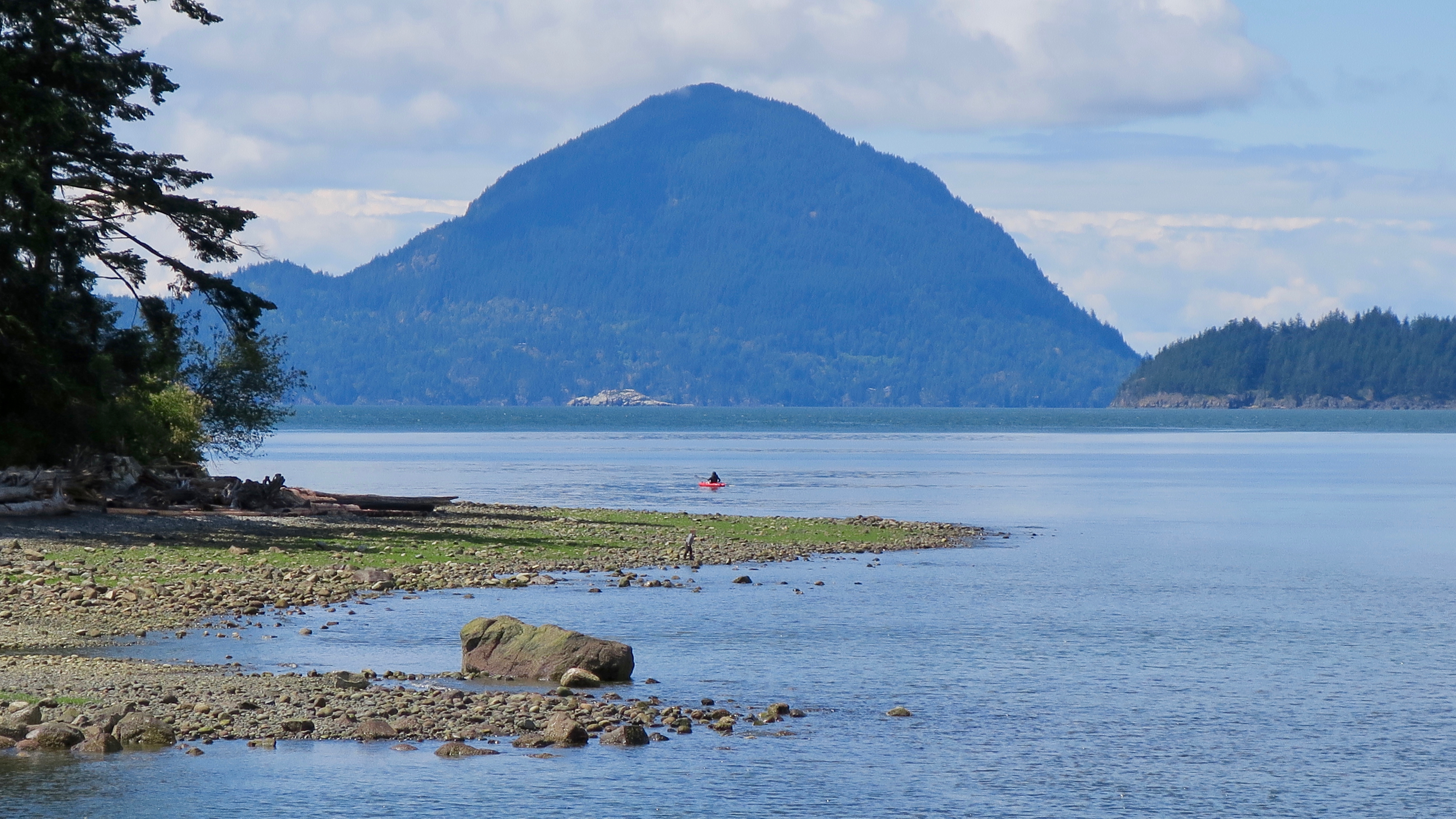
Porteau Cove Provincial Park
