= The Amazing Race Canada 6 =

Season of television series

- Season 6
- Presented by: Jon Montgomery
- No. of teams: 10
- Winners: Courtney Berglind & Adam Kovacs
- No. of legs: 11
- Distance traveled: 50,000 km (31,000 mi)
- No. of episodes: 11

Release
- Original network: CTV
- Original release: July 3 – September 11, 2018

Additional information
- Filming dates: April 23 – May 19, 2018

Series chronology
- ← Previous; Season 5 Next → Season 7

The Amazing Race Canada 6 (also known as The Amazing Race Canada: Heroes Edition) is the sixth season of The Amazing Race Canada, a Canadian reality competition show based on the American series The Amazing Race. Hosted by Jon Montgomery, it featured ten teams of two, consisting of everyday Canadian heroes, in a race across Canada and the world. The grand prize included a CA$250,000 cash payout, a trip for two around the world, and two 2018 Chevrolet Traverse Redlines. This season visited six provinces, one territory, and two additional countries and travelled over 50,000 kilometres (31,000 mi) during eleven legs. Starting in Colwood, British Columbia, racers travelled through British Columbia, the Yukon, Indonesia, Ontario, Manitoba, Prince Edward Island, Mexico, New Brunswick, and Alberta before finishing in Banff, Alberta. New twists introduced in this season include the Blind Double U-Turn and U-Turns placed at Detour decision points. The season premiered on CTV on July 3, 2018, with the season finale airing on September 11, 2018.

Engaged first responders Courtney Berglind and Adam Kovacs were the winners of this season, while Mountie siblings Taylor and Courtney Callens finished in second place, and friends and coaches Dylan Elias and Kwame Osei finished in third place.

== Production ==
=== Development and filming ===
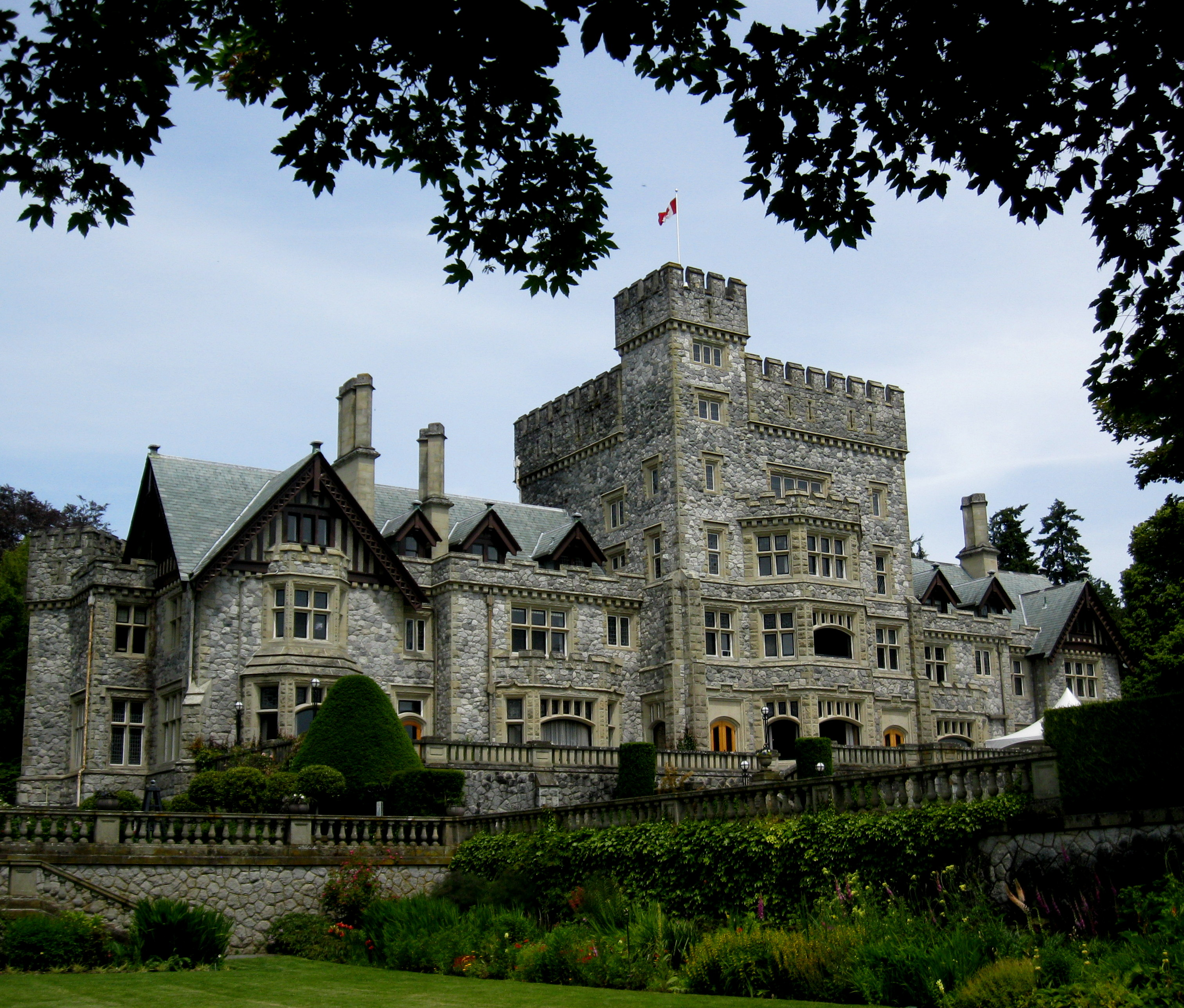
Hatley Castle in the city of Colwood, British Columbia, served as the backdrop for the starting line of the sixth season of The Amazing Race Canada.

On October 12, 2017, CTV announced that the show was renewed for its sixth season.

Filming of The Amazing Race Canada 6 began on April 23, 2018, when the show's Facebook page broadcast the start of the season during its first of six "Jon on the Road: Presented by Chevrolet Facebook Live", which featured Devon Soltendieck of etalk interviewing host Jon Montgomery at the starting line, Hatley Gardens in Colwood, British Columbia, before the competition began. The five subsequent live streams featured Jon during filming of the season, offering hints about destinations on the racecourse. On April 28, racers were spotted in Salt Spring Island.

During the airing of the tenth episode, a message in white on a black background – Dedicated to the people of Fredericton, New Brunswick – indirectly recognized the Fredericton shooting that had occurred since the filming of the leg and prior to the episode airing.

=== Marketing ===
Chevrolet continued sponsoring the show and was the sole sponsor of the Facebook Live events. Canadian Tire's outfitter brand Woods also continued their sponsorship from the previous season. New sponsors were Alcon Dailies contact lenses, Dempster's Bakery, Royal Canadian Legion, and SkipTheDishes.

== Cast ==
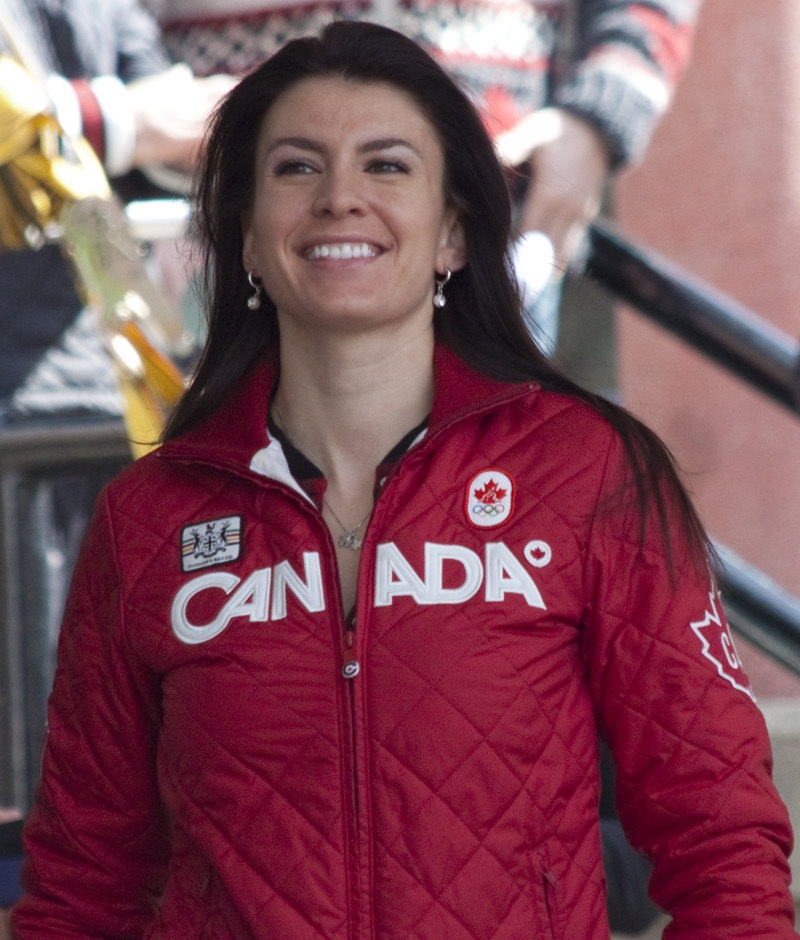
Mellisa Hollingsworth

The cast included Olympic bronze medalist in skeleton, Mellisa Hollingsworth. Courtney Berglind had previously appeared in two episodes of Big Brother Canada 4 to compete in an award challenge on behalf of her sister, Kelsey Faith.

Contestants	Age	Relationship	Profession	Hometown	Status
Corey "Chewy" Liddle	47	Friends	Retired Air Force Pilots	Stoney Creek, Ontario	Eliminated 1st (in Britannia Beach, British Columbia)
Mark "Happy" LaVerdiere	48	Friends	Retired Air Force Pilots	Orillia, Ontario	Eliminated 1st (in Britannia Beach, British Columbia)
Joseph Truong	23	Friends	Volunteers	Toronto, Ontario	Eliminated 2nd (in Shawnigan Lake, British Columbia)
Akash Sidhu	22	Friends	Volunteers	Toronto, Ontario	Eliminated 2nd (in Shawnigan Lake, British Columbia)
Todd Kirk	24	Dating	Advocates	Edmonton, Alberta	Eliminated 3rd (in Jakarta, Indonesia)
Anna Holtby	24	Dating	Advocates	Edmonton, Alberta	Eliminated 3rd (in Jakarta, Indonesia)
Zainab Ansari	32	Co-Workers	Navy Sailors	Toronto, Ontario	Eliminated 4th (in Toronto, Ontario)
Monica Demian	24	Co-Workers	Navy Sailors	Ajax, Ontario	Eliminated 4th (in Toronto, Ontario)
Leanne Larsen	25	Teammates	Mentors	Toronto, Ontario	Eliminated 5th (in Cavendish, Prince Edward Island)
Mar Lyon	26	Teammates	Mentors	Toronto, Ontario	Eliminated 5th (in Cavendish, Prince Edward Island)
Nancy Csabay	49	Teammates	Elite Athletes	Taber, Alberta	Eliminated 6th (in Mexico City, Mexico)
Mellisa Hollingsworth	37	Teammates	Elite Athletes	Eckville, Alberta	Eliminated 6th (in Mexico City, Mexico)
Martina Seo	40	Siblings	Volunteers	North Vancouver, British Columbia	Eliminated 7th (in Fredericton, New Brunswick)
Phil Seo	37	Siblings	Volunteers	Burnaby, British Columbia	Eliminated 7th (in Fredericton, New Brunswick)
Dylan Elias	28	Friends	Coaches	Fort McMurray, Alberta	Third place
Kwame Osei	34	Friends	Coaches	Fort McMurray, Alberta	Third place
Taylor Callens	25	Siblings	Mounties	Williams Lake, British Columbia	Runners-up
Courtney Callens	27	Siblings	Mounties	Langley, British Columbia	Runners-up
Courtney Berglind	28	Engaged	First Responders	Calgary, Alberta	Winners
Adam Kovacs	29	Engaged	First Responders	Calgary, Alberta	Winners

=== Future appearances ===
Martina & Phil appeared on an online weekly series companion series for The Amazing Race Canada 7 called "Tastes of the Race", in which they faced off in a cooking competition inspired by the season's locations while using Dempster's Bakery products. On December 28, 2021, Martina and Phil also competed with their family on an episode of Family Feud Canada. They won $10,000 on the Fast Money round in their first appearance, then returned twice more before losing to the opposing family on Day 3.

== Results ==
The following teams are listed with their placements in each leg. Placements are listed in finishing order.

- A red placement with a dagger (†) indicates that the team was eliminated.
- An underlined blue placement with a double-dagger (‡) indicates that the team was the last to arrive at a Pit Stop in a non-elimination leg, and had to perform a Speed Bump task in the following leg.
- An italicized and underlined placement indicates that the team was the last to arrive at a Pit Stop, but there was no rest period at the Pit Stop and all teams were instructed to continue racing.
- A purple ε indicates that the team used an Express Pass on that leg to bypass one of their tasks.
- A brown ⊃ indicates that the team used the U-Turn and a brown ⊂ indicates the team on the receiving end of the U-Turn.
- A teal х indicates that the leg featured a Face Off challenge.

Team placement (by leg)
Team	1	2	3	4	5	6	7х (Note: This leg featured a Face Off challenge.)	8	9	10х	11
Courtney & Adam	8th	7th	6th	7th	2nd	6th⊃ (Note: Courtney & Adam chose to use the U-Turn on Zainab & Monica.)	5th	2nd	4th	3rd	1st
Taylor & Courtney	5th	3rd	1st	5th	1st	1st	1st	3rd	3rd	1st	2nd
Dylan & Kwame	4th	5th	5th	3rd	4th	5th	4th	5th	1st	2nd	3rd
Martina & Phil	7th	6th	4th	6th⊂ (Note: Nancy & Mellisa chose to use the U-Turn on Martina & Phil.)	3rd (Note: Martina & Phil initially arrived 2nd, but they had arrived at the Pit Stop without their backpacks and had to go back to retrieve them before being allowed to check in. Courtney & Adam checked in during this time, dropping Martina & Phil to 3rd.)	3rd	2nd	4th	2nd	4th†	
Nancy & Mellisa	2nd	2nd	8thε (Note: This team used their Express Pass to bypass one of the tasks on this leg.)	2nd⊃	5th	2nd	6th‡	1st	5th†		
Leanne & Mar	1st	4th	3rdε	1st	6th	4th	3rd	6th† (Note: Leanne & Mar initially arrived 4th, but were issued a 2-hour penalty, because Leanne did not complete the paintball challenge. Two other teams checked in during this penalty time, dropping Leanne & Mar to last.)			
Zainab & Monica	6th	9th‡	7th	4th⊃ (Note: Zainab & Monica chose to use the U-Turn on Todd & Anna.)	7th (Note: This team arrived last at the Pit Stop, but they were instructed to continue racing.)	7th†⊂					
Todd & Anna	3rd	1st	2ndε	8th†⊂							
Joseph & Akash	9th	8th	9th†								
Chewy & Happy	10th†										

== Race summary ==
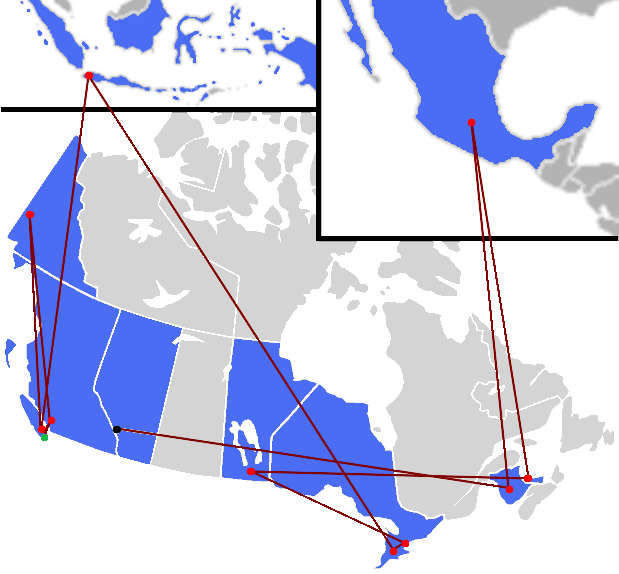
Route for The Amazing Race Canada 6.

Destinations	Air travel Rail travel Water travel Bus travel Helicopter travel Bicycle travel Gondola travel
Route Markers	Detour Roadblock Face Off Express Pass; U-Turn Speed Bump Pit Stop

=== Leg 1 (British Columbia) ===
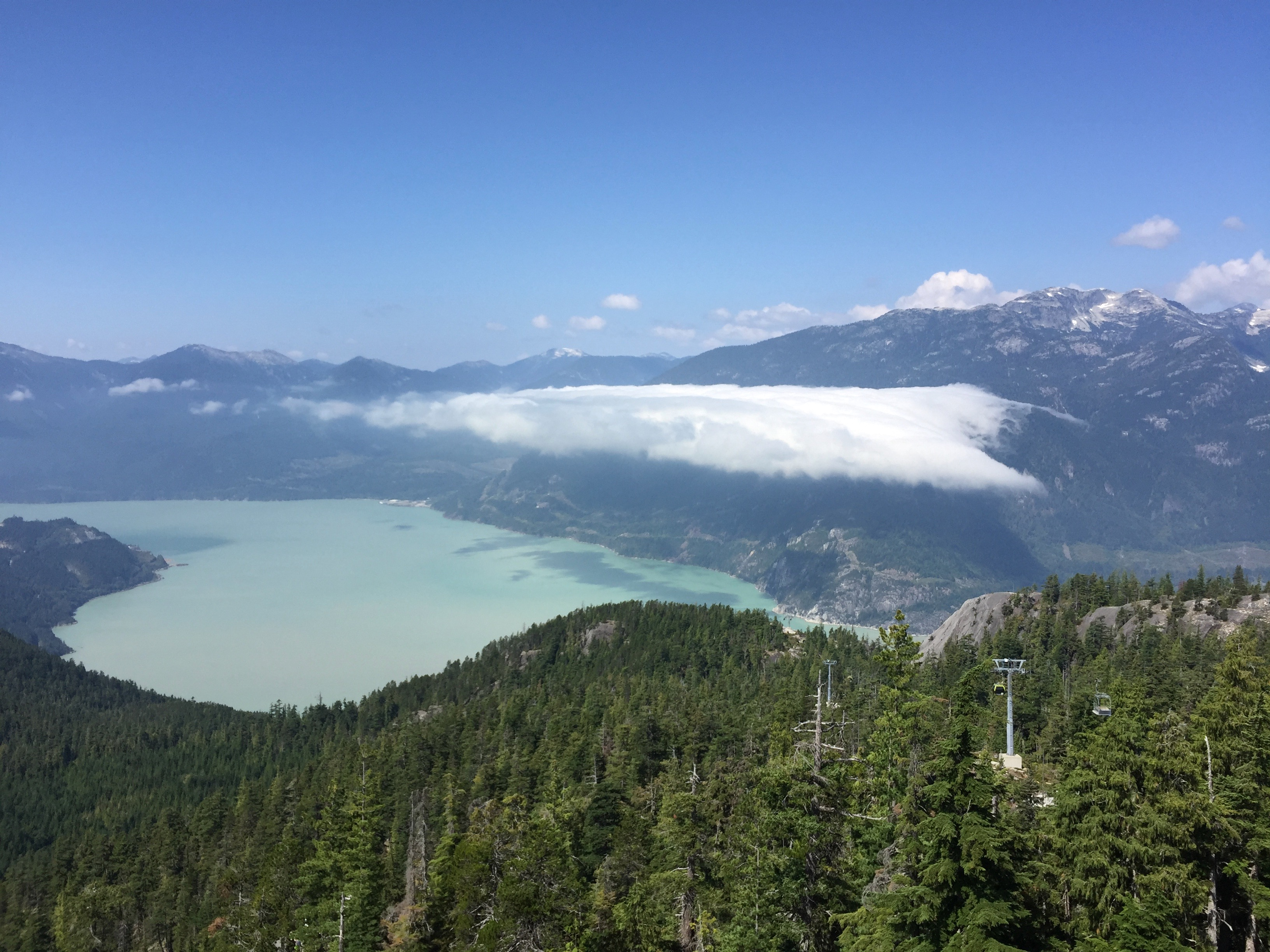
Upon arrival in mainland British Columbia, teams visited the Sea-to-Sky Corridor where they encountered the season's first Roadblock.

- Episode 1: "Just a Beaver Hero" (July 3, 2018)
- Prize: A trip for two to Tokyo, Japan (awarded to Leanne & Mar)
- Eliminated: Chewy & Happy

Locations

- Colwood, British Columbia (Hatley Park National Historic Site – Hatley Gardens) (Starting Line)
- Swartz Bay → Delta
- Squamish (Sea-to-Sky Gondola – Panorama Trail)
- Squamish (Squamish Days Loggers' Sports Festival)
- Squamish (Darrell Bay)
- Britannia Beach (Britannia Mine Museum – Mill No.3)

Episode summary

- Teams set off from Hatley Gardens in Colwood, British Columbia, and had to search the grounds around Hatley Castle for their backpacks with their first clue. They had to travel by ferry to the Lower Mainland and then drive to the Sea to Sky Gondola. There, teams had to sign for one of five gondolas to the top of the mountain, where they found their next clue.
- In this season's first Roadblock, one team member had to ride a zipline to a net suspended high above the Mamquam Valley. Attached to a bungee cord, they then had to jump from the net to grab a plush beaver toy and exchange it for their next clue. If they missed, they had to wait at the back of the line to try again.
- After the first Roadblock, teams found their next clue at Squamish Days Loggers' Sports Festival.
- In this leg's second Roadblock, the team member who did not perform the previous Roadblock had to complete a loggersports activity by climbing an 80-foot (24 m) pole, with the aid of spurs and a harness, to retrieve their next clue at the top.
- After the second Roadblock, teams had to put on wetsuits and steer a paddleboard toward 20 buoys floating in Darrell Bay, each tied to a trap below containing a live crab. They had to choose a trap, pull it up, and then return to shore to have the crab measured. If the crab was regulation size, they received their next clue directing them to the Pit Stop at the Britannia Mine Museum in Britannia Beach.

=== Leg 2 (British Columbia → Yukon) ===
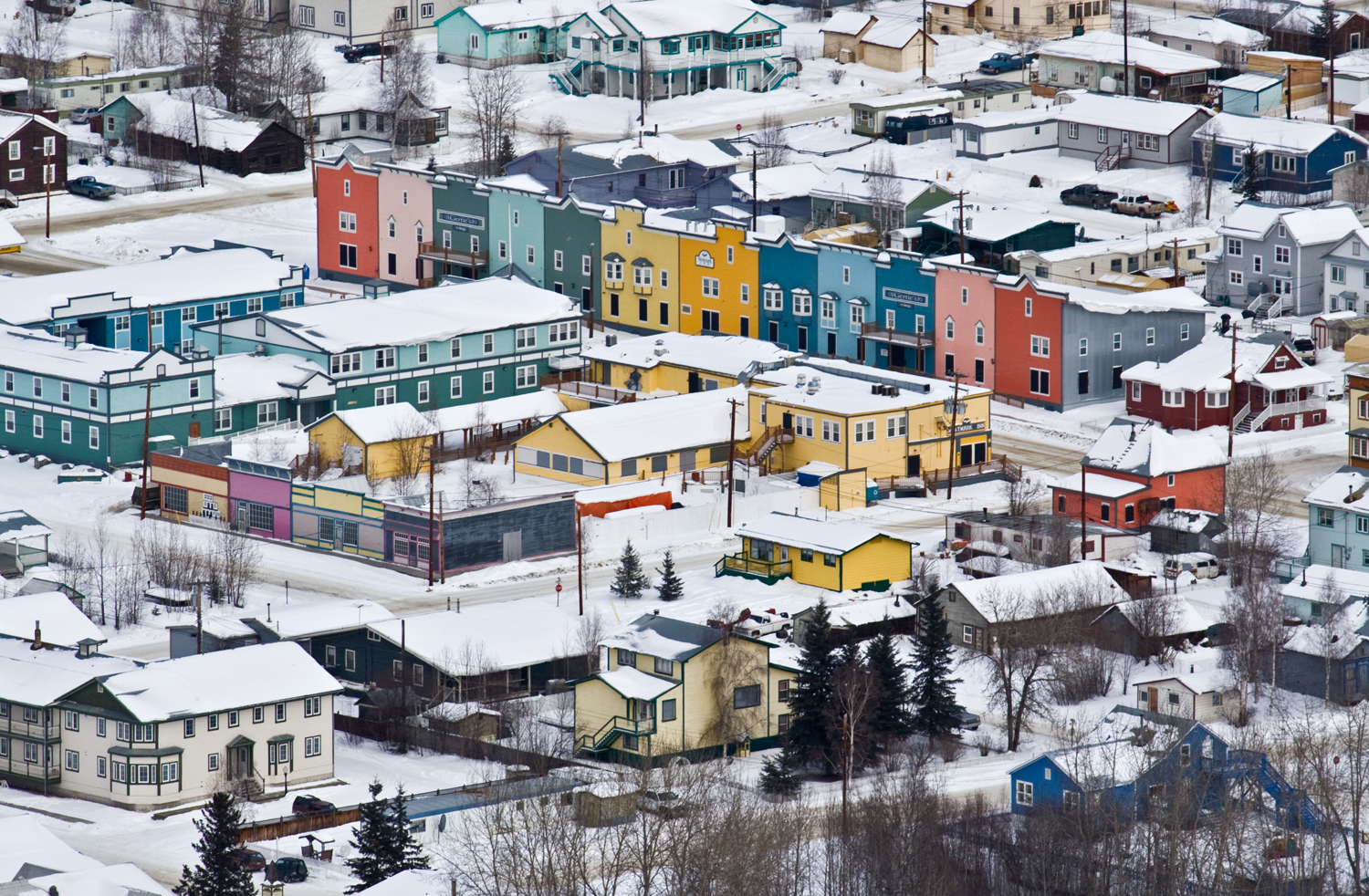
While in Dawson City, tasks were focused in the downtown area and around its historic role in the Klondike Gold Rush.

- Episode 2: "Fiddler's Fart" (July 10, 2018)
- Prize: A trip for two to Southern France (awarded to Todd & Anna)

Locations

- Squamish (Executive Suites Hotel & Resort Squamish)
- Vancouver → Dawson City, Yukon (Dawson City Airport)
- Dawson City (Dredge No. 4)
- Dawson City (Bank of British North America & Numerous Locations)
- Dawson City (Palace Grand Theatre or Diamond Tooth Gerties Gambling Hall)
- Dawson City (Midnight Dome)

Episode summary

- At the start of this leg, teams were instructed to fly to Dawson City, Yukon. Once there, teams had to search the airport parking lot for a marked truck, which contained their next clue, and then load it up with camping supplies. Teams then drove to Dredge No. 4 and had to correctly assemble a campsite such that it matched an example setup in order to receive their next clue. In addition, Todd & Anna won a $5,000 prize because they assembled their campsite the fastest.
- At the Bank of British North America, teams received a GPS receiver with nine pre-programmed destinations. Teams had to search Dawson City to find one gold coin at each of five different locations: the SS Keno, the George Mercer Dawson commemorative plaque near the Yukon Hotel, the Robert W. Service Cabin, the Red Feather Saloon, and the Clapp & Jones steam-powered fire engine at the Dawson City Firefighter Museum. Teams could also find an Express Pass at three different locations: the former post office, the Dänojà Zho Cultural Centre, and the Hillside Cemetery. One location, the Commissioner's Residence, had neither a coin nor an Express Pass. After finding the five coins, teams had to return to the bank to exchange their coins for their next clue.
- This season's first Detour was a choice between Dance or Chance. In Dance, teams had to travel to the Palace Grand Theatre, where they donned burlesque outfits and watched a can-can performance. Teams then had to join the performers on stage and correctly perform the dance in order to receive their next clue. In Chance, teams had to travel to Diamond Tooth Gerties Gambling Hall and watch a round of blackjack. After observing the round, team members then assumed the role of dealer, and both members had to deal out a hand to casino patrons and properly pay out casino chips in order to receive their next clue. If teams made a mistake, they had to go to the back of the line before they could try again.
- After the Detour, teams had to check in at the Pit Stop: the Midnight Dome.

Additional note

- This was a non-elimination leg.

=== Leg 3 (Yukon → British Columbia) ===
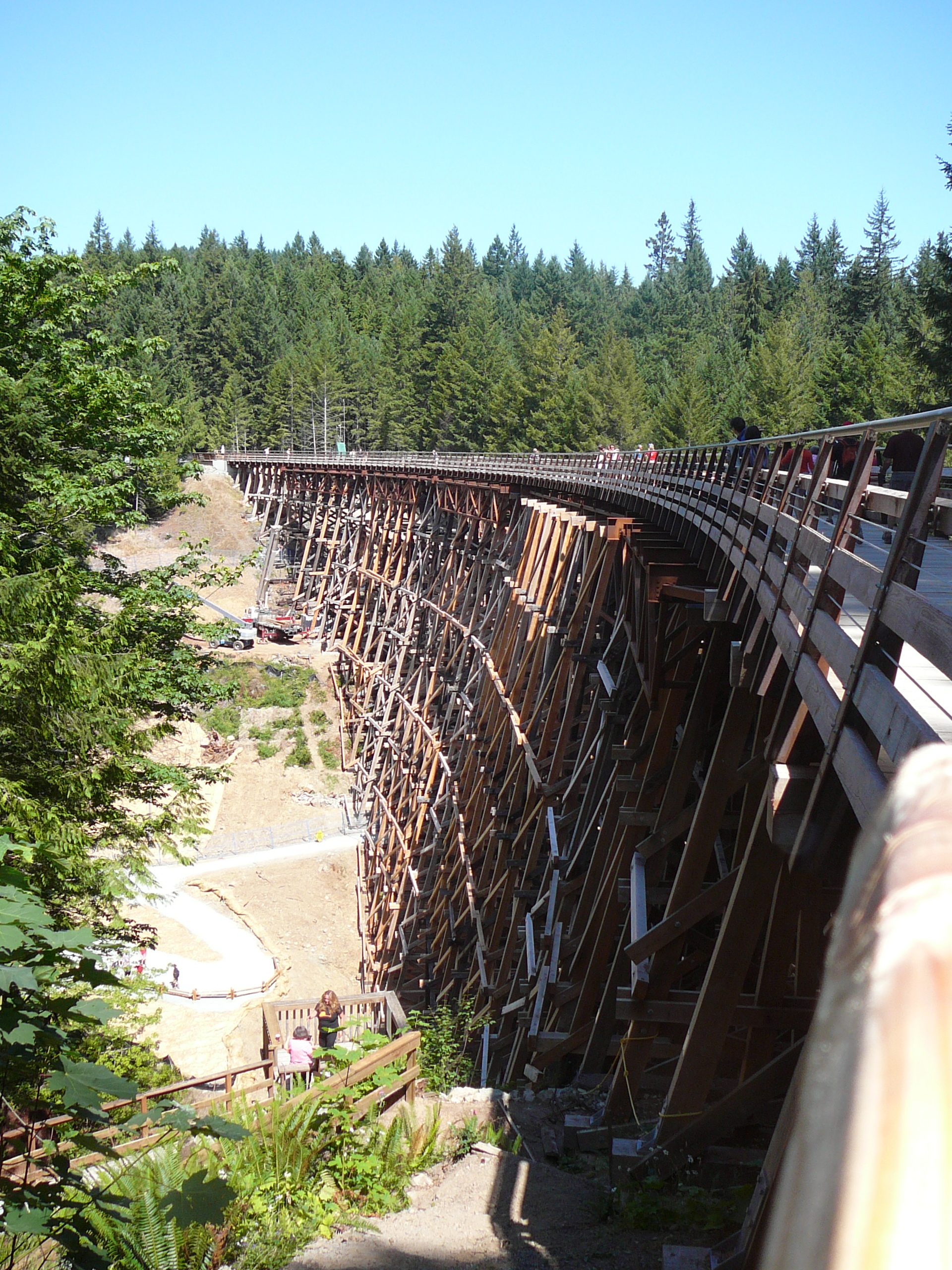
Teams ended this leg in Cowichan Valley at the Kinsol Trestle, one of the highest wooden former railway trestles in the world.

- Episode 3: "Sounds Like a Wild Boar" (July 17, 2018)
- Prize: A trip for two to Boston, Massachusetts (awarded to Taylor & Courtney)
- Eliminated: Joseph & Akash

Locations

- Dawson City (Downtown Hotel)
- Dawson City → Vancouver, British Columbia
- Vancouver (Vancouver Harbour Air Terminal) → Ganges, Salt Spring Island (Ganges Harbour)
- Ganges (Salt Spring Saturday Market)
- Mount Erskine Provincial Park (Mount Erskine Access Trail – Fairy Doors)
- Vesuvius → Crofton, Vancouver Island
- Duncan (Vancouver Island Motorsport Circuit)
- Duncan (Pacific Northwest Raptors)
- Shawnigan Lake (Kinsol Trestle)

Episode summary

- At the start of this leg, teams were instructed to fly to Vancouver, British Columbia. Once there, teams had to travel to the Vancouver Harbour Air Terminal, sign up for one of five seaplanes to Ganges on Salt Spring Island, and find their next clue at the harbour.
- For their Speed Bump, Zainab & Monica had to correctly identify eight flavour-infused fleur de sel samples before they could continue racing.
- At the Salt Spring Saturday Market, each team had to eat two whole blueberry pies in order to receive a key to a marked vehicle, which contained their next clue. Todd & Anna and Leanne & Mar used their Express Passes to bypass this task. Teams then drove to the Mount Erskine Access Trail and had to search through the park's ten fairy doors for their next clue, which was hidden behind three of the doors. Nancy & Mellisa used their Express Pass to bypass this task.
- In this leg's first Roadblock, teams had to travel to by ferry to Crofton on Vancouver Island and then drive to Vancouver Island Motorsport Circuit, where one team member had to complete a full lap in a convertible around the circuit within three minutes, without exceeding 80 kilometres per hour (50 mph), in order to receive their next clue.
- After the first Roadblock, teams found their next clue at Pacific Northwest Raptors.
- In this leg's second Roadblock, the team member who did not perform the previous Roadblock had to observe a silent demonstration of how to tie a falconer's knot. After donning a protective glove and having a live raptor placed on their arm, racers had to correctly lash the bird's leash to the glove's metal loop within fifteen seconds in order to receive their next clue directing them to the Pit Stop: the Kinsol Trestle in Shawnigan Lake.

=== Leg 4 (British Columbia → Indonesia) ===
Teams finished this leg in Jakarta at Merdeka Square, in the shadow of Indonesia's National Monument.

- Episode 4: "Just Suck My Blood Please" (July 24, 2018)
- Prize: A trip for two to Ho Chi Minh City, Vietnam (awarded to Leanne & Mar)
- Eliminated: Todd & Anna

Locations

- Duncan (Duncan Station)
- Victoria → Jakarta, Indonesia
- Jakarta (Old City – Fatahillah Square)
- Jakarta (Pelabuhan Sunda Kelapa)
- Jakarta (Kebayoran Baru – Pasar Burung Barito)
- Jakarta (Langsat Park or Mayestik Market)
- Jakarta (Kebayoran Baru – Gedung Teater Bulungan)
- Jakarta (Merdeka Square)

Episode summary

- At the start of this leg, teams were instructed to fly to Jakarta, Indonesia. Once there, they had to travel to Fatahillah Square and sign up for one of three departure times the next morning. They then had to watch a traditional welcoming performance by dancers in ondel-ondel costumes before they received their next clue. Teams were then directed to Pelabuhan Sunda Kelapa, where they had to carry durians by hand from a truck and onto a pinisi until they filled a crate in order to receive their next clue. Teams were then directed to Pasar Burung Barito in order to find their next clue.
- This leg's Detour was a choice between Ular or Kebaya. In Ular, teams had to find a snake handler within Langsat Park, choose a container, and completely clean the live snake inside. Once approved, they then moved to a medical station where each team member had to attach a leech to their partner's arm and let it suck their blood for five minutes before receiving their next clue. In Kebaya, teams had to find a marked sewing stall in Mayestik Market. Using a sewing machine, they had to sew two panels of fabric, and then sew each panel to the underside of the lapels of a woman's blazer known as a kebaya in order to receive their next clue.
- After the Detour, teams found their next clue at Gedung Teater Bulungan.
- In this leg's Roadblock, one team member had to perform a Saman dance. After dressing in costume, they had to correctly perform a series of complex hand and body movements in sync with a group of dancers on stage in order to receive their next clue, which directed them to the Pit Stop: Merdeka Square, overlooking Indonesia's National Monument.

Additional note

- This leg featured a Blind Double U-Turn. Nancy & Mellisa chose to use the U-Turn on Martina & Phil, while Zainab & Monica chose to use the U-Turn on Todd & Anna.

=== Leg 5 (Indonesia → Ontario) ===
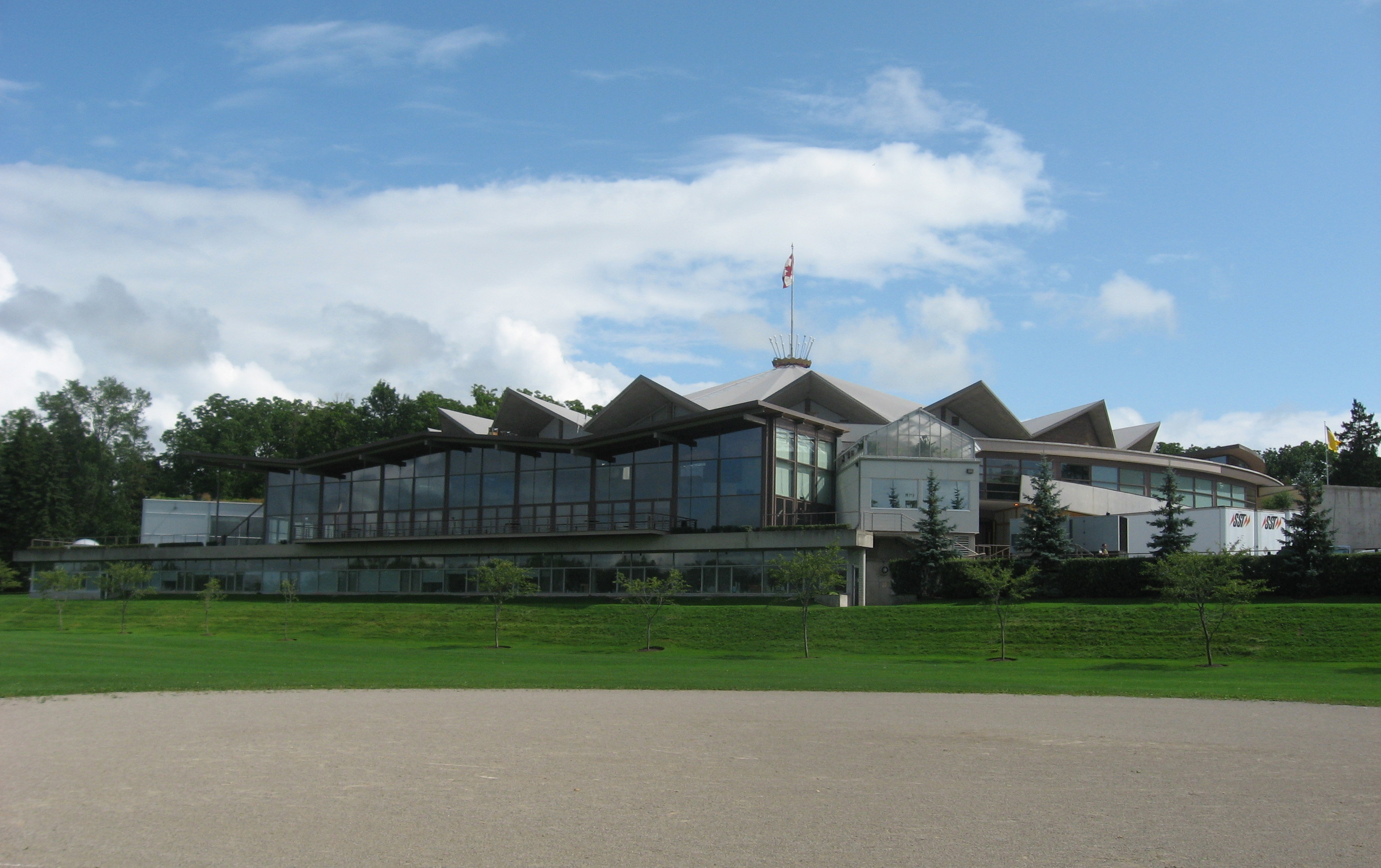
The Roadblock in Stratford took place in the Festival Theatre, home of the Stratford Festival.

- Episode 5: "You Gotta Whip That Cream" (July 31, 2018)
- Prize: A trip for two to London, England (awarded to Taylor & Courtney)

Locations

- Jakarta (AYANA Midplaza Jakarta)
- Jakarta → Toronto, Ontario (Toronto Pearson International Airport)
- Ingersoll (CAMI Automotive Assembly)
- Stratford (Festival Theatre)
- Stratford (Avon River – Avon Boat Rentals or Rhéo Thompson Candies)
- Stratford (Stratford City Hall)

Episode summary

- At the start of this leg, teams were instructed to fly to Toronto, Ontario. Once there, teams had to search the airport parking lot for a marked vehicle, which contained their next clue. Teams were instructed to travel to the place where their car had been assembled and they had to figure out that this was the CAMI Automotive Assembly in Ingersoll. Once there, teams had to sign up for admittance to the plant the next morning. Once inside the plant, teams had to watch a silent demonstration and follow the nineteen steps to correctly assemble one front door in order to receive their next clue. Teams were then directed to the Festival Theatre in Stratford.
- In this leg's Roadblock, one team member had to dress in Elizabethan costume and then convincingly act out a sword fighting duel scene, ending with their "death," in order to receive their next clue.
- This leg's Detour was a choice between Pedal or Package. In Pedal, teams had to use a paddle boat to navigate part of the Avon River in Stratford and collect six illustrated cards. When placed in the correct order, the cards formed a rebus that encoded the words Queen of the Square. In Package, teams travelled to Rhéo Thompson Candies, where they had to correctly assemble and package ten boxes of assorted mint chocolates and ten boxes of assorted jelly candies in order to receive their next clue, which only stated Queen of the Square.
- Teams had to figure out that the "Queen of the Square" was a cinema that holds film screenings inside the Stratford City Hall auditorium, where they found the next Pit Stop.

Additional note

- There was no elimination at the end of this leg; all teams were instead instructed to continue racing.

=== Leg 6 (Ontario) ===
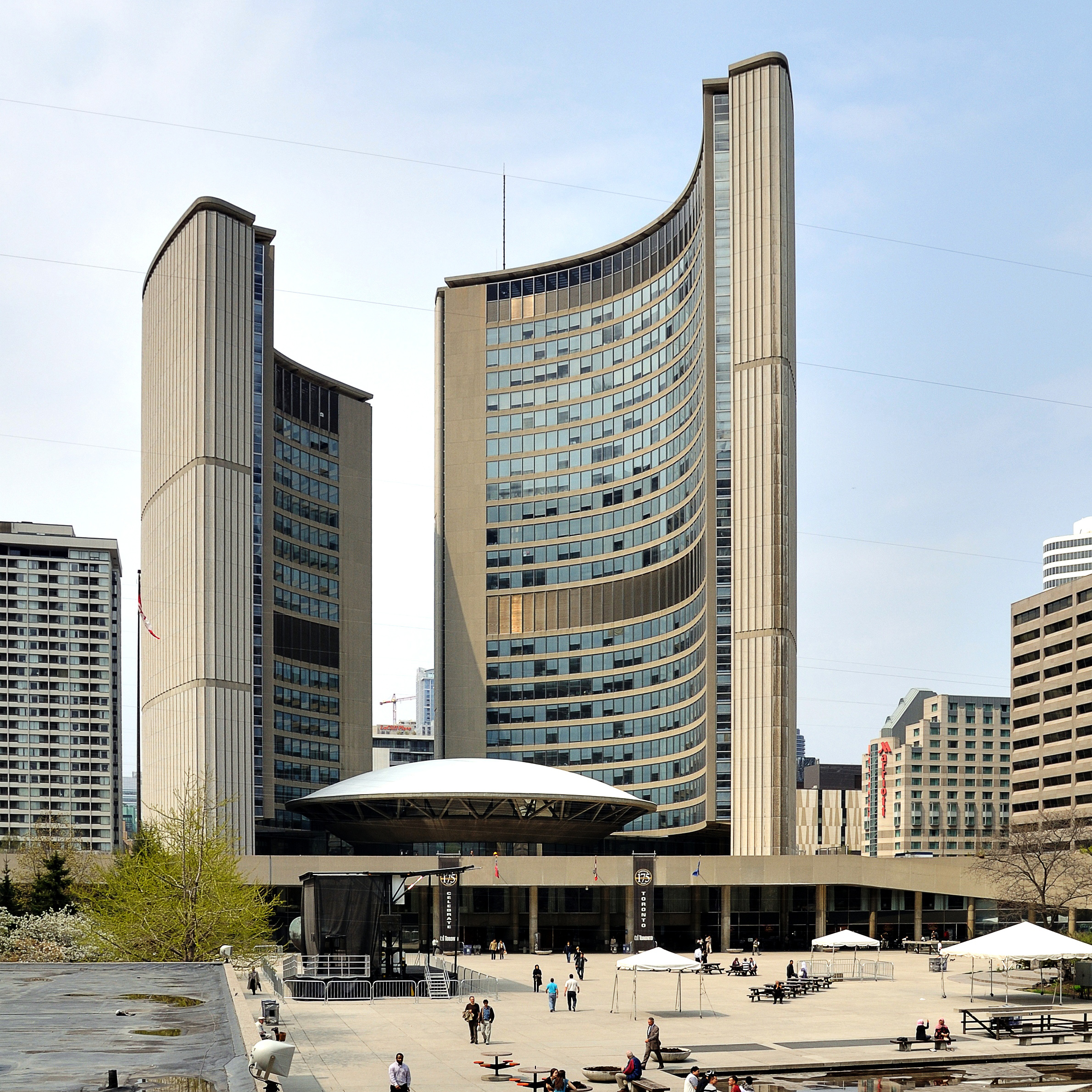
At the beginning of this leg, teams visited Toronto City Hall, where they had to search for an Amazing Race flag from the observation deck.

- Episode 6: "Smells Like Sweat and Fun" (August 7, 2018)
- Prize: A trip for two to Hong Kong, and CA$5,000 from Dempster's Bakery donated to a food bank in their community (awarded to Taylor & Courtney)
- Eliminated: Zainab & Monica

Locations

- Toronto (Toronto City Hall – East Tower Observation Deck)
- Toronto (Yonge–Dundas Square)
- Toronto (The Monkey's Paw)
- Toronto (El Convento Rico or Versus Coffee)
- Toronto (North York Harvest Food Bank)
- Toronto (Ireland Park)

Episode summary

- At the start of this leg, teams were instructed to drive to Toronto City Hall, where they had to go up to the observation deck on the 27th floor of the east tower and search for a red and yellow Amazing Race flag on the roof of their next destination: Yonge–Dundas Square.
- In this leg's Roadblock, one team member had to choose a marked vehicle and load it with a variety of household items without putting any in the passenger seat or obstructing vision through the rear-view mirror. Using the backup camera, they had to reverse the vehicle through a slalom course without knocking over any of the cones and then back into a marked space. Once completed, they had to contact OnStar to receive their next destination.
- Teams were instructed to travel via the Toronto subway to The Monkey's Paw bookstore. There, they received a token to insert into the Biblio-Mat, a book vending machine, and they found their next clue inside the dispensed book.
- This leg's Detour was a choice between Walk the Part or Latte Art. In Walk the Part, teams had to dress in colourful costumes and then correctly perform a Vogue routine with a dance troupe in front of an audience in order to receive their next clue. In Latte Art, teams had to work as baristas by correctly preparing two cups of latte and re-creating a leaf pattern of latte art in the foam using food colouring and proper pouring technique in order to receive their next clue.
- At the North York Harvest Food Bank, teams had to choose a list of various bread products and pack the specified quantities of each product into red boxes to receive their next clue, which directed them to the Pit Stop: Ireland Park.

Additional notes

- This leg featured a Double U-Turn. Courtney & Adam chose to use the U-Turn on Zainab & Monica.
- Season 5 winners Sam Lambert and Paul Mitskopoulos appeared as the Pit Stop greeters for this leg.

=== Leg 7 (Ontario → Manitoba) ===
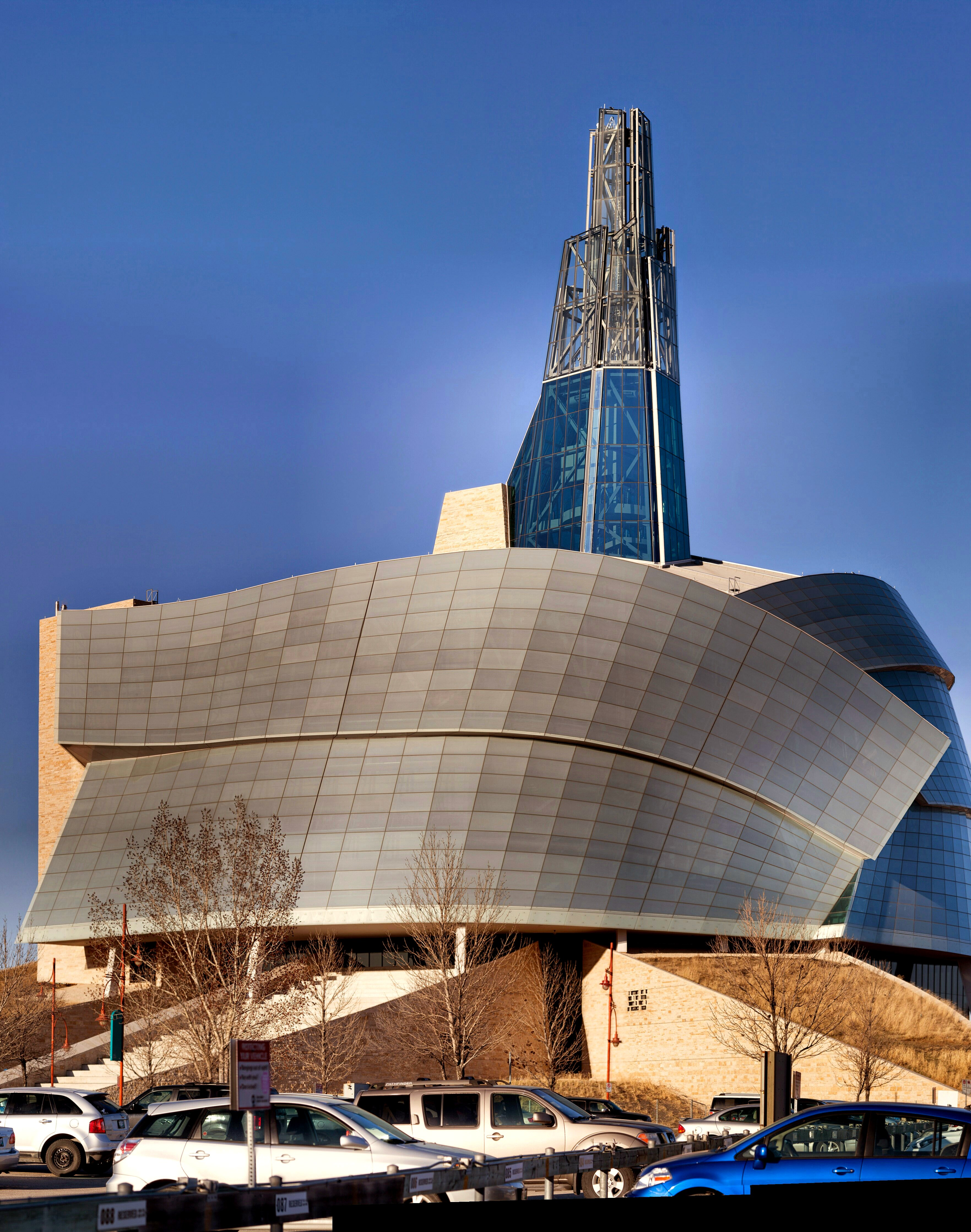
After arriving in Winnipeg, teams visited the Canadian Museum for Human Rights, where they completed a task involving quotes from famous human rights leaders.

- Episode 7: "Poodle Time" (August 14, 2018)
- Prize: A trip for two to New York City, New York (awarded to Taylor & Courtney)

Locations

- Toronto → Winnipeg, Manitoba (Winnipeg International Airport)
- Winnipeg (Canadian Museum for Human Rights)
- Winnipeg (Royal Winnipeg Ballet or SkipTheDishes Headquarters)
- Winnipeg (Royal Canadian Legion St. James Branch #4)
- Winnipeg (The Forks Market)
- Winnipeg (Assiniboine Park – Leo Mol Sculpture Garden)

Episode summary

- At the start of this leg, teams were instructed to fly to Winnipeg, Manitoba. Once there, teams had to search the airport parking lot for a marked truck, which contained their next clue. Teams were directed to the Canadian Museum for Human Rights, where they were presented with eighteen different quotations from human rights leaders. They then had to search the museum and match each quotation to the correct leader in order to receive their next clue.
- This leg's Detour was a choice between Tights or Bites. In Tights, teams travelled to the Royal Winnipeg Ballet. After donning ballet attire, teams had to properly perform the Danse des petits cygnes from Tchaikovsky's Swan Lake to the satisfaction of the artistic director in order to receive their next clue. In Bites, teams travelled to the logistics headquarters of SkipTheDishes and were given two food orders from the company's mobile app. After picking up the orders from the affiliated restaurants, teams had to deliver them to the correct destinations. If teams received two positive reviews, they received their next clue.
- For this season's first Face Off, teams had to travel to St. James Branch #4 of the Royal Canadian Legion and compete against each other in a game of darts, where teams had to hit all twenty sections of a dartboard. If a team member hit the bullseye, they could remove any two sections from their dartboard. The first team to hit all twenty sections won their next clue, while the losing team had to wait for another team. The last team remaining at the Face Off had to turn over an hourglass and wait out a time penalty before moving on.
- After the Face Off, teams found their next clue at The Forks Market.
- In this leg's Roadblock, one team member had to correctly perform the cups and balls magic trick in front of a crowd and then make a balloon animal dog in order to receive their next clue, which directed teams to the Pit Stop: the Leo Mol sculpture garden in Assiniboine Park.

Additional note

- This was a non-elimination leg.

=== Leg 8 (Manitoba → Prince Edward Island) ===
While on Prince Edward Island, teams searched for part of their next clue at the Confederation Centre of the Arts.

- Episode 8: "Those Zombies Are Honing In On Us" (August 21, 2018)
- Prize: A trip for two to Istanbul, Turkey (awarded to Nancy & Mellisa)
- Eliminated: Leanne & Mar

Locations

- Winnipeg (Portage and Main)
- Winnipeg → Charlottetown, Prince Edward Island
- Charlottetown (Beaconsfield Historic House, Victoria Row Arch, Confederation Centre of the Arts & Merchantman Fresh Seafood & Oyster Bar)
- Charlottetown (The Humble Barber)
- New London (The Table Culinary Studio)
- Brackley Beach (The Great Canadian Soap Company) or North Rustico (Blue Bay Farms)
- Cavendish (Crossfire Adventure Paintball)
- Cavendish (Cavendish Beach)

Episode summary

- At the start of this leg, teams were instructed to fly to Charlottetown, Prince Edward Island. Once there, teams had to travel to the Beaconsfield Historic House, where they were directed to find three of the nine Eckhart mice located throughout downtown Charlottetown. Teams found a miniature clue envelope that contained a piece of their next clue attached to the mice located at the Victoria Row Arch, the Confederation Centre of the Arts box office, and the Merchantman Fresh Seafood & Oyster Bar. Once they had all three miniature clues, teams were only instructed to drive to the intersection of Route 6 and Grahams Road to find their next clue.
- For their Speed Bump, Nancy & Mellisa had to cut the hair of two women, who were donating their hair to the Canadian Cancer Society, before they could continue racing.
- In this leg's Roadblock, one team member had to unscramble the words of four courses on a menu and then serve the dishes to a restaurant patron in order to receive their next clue.
- This leg's Detour was a choice between Suds or Spuds. In Suds, teams had to travel to The Great Canadian Soap Company and first milk a goat until they had a specified amount of milk. Then, teams had to identify ten uniquely-scented soaps by smell in order to receive their next clue. In Spuds, teams had to travel to Blue Bay Farms and till a section of a field so as to create four rows. Teams then had to properly cut and plant potatoes, each containing an eye and spaced a hoe's width (4 to 5 inches, or 10 to 13 cm) apart, in their rows in order to receive their next clue.
- At Crossfire Adventure Paintball, teams had to search a paintball course for their next clue while attempting to avoid zombies who were firing paintball guns at them. Teams had to wait out a one-minute penalty for each paintball hit they took. Teams then had to check in at the Pit Stop: Cavendish Beach.

=== Leg 9 (Prince Edward Island → Mexico) ===
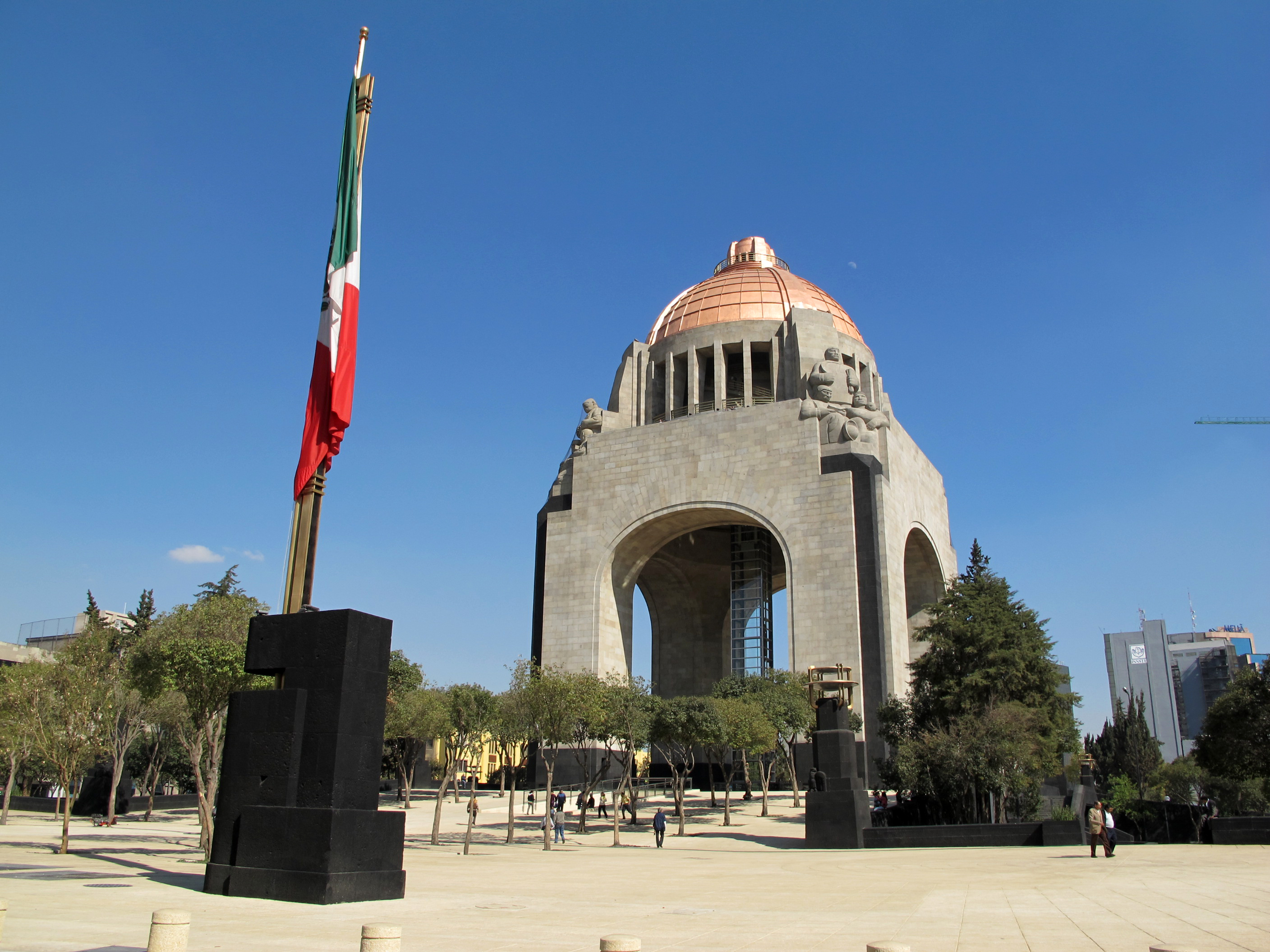
After arriving in Mexico City, teams travelled to the Monumento a la Revolución in the Plaza de la República for a video clue from their loved ones.

- Episode 9: "The Battle of the Two Courtneys" (August 28, 2018)
- Prize: A trip for two to Sydney, Australia (awarded to Dylan & Kwame)
- Eliminated: Nancy & Mellisa

Locations

- Charlottetown (Queen's Wharf)
- Charlottetown → Mexico City, Mexico
- Mexico City (Plaza de la República – Monumento a la Revolución)
- Mexico City (Frontón México)
- Mexico City (Jardín del Centenario – Fuente de los Coyotes or Iztapalapa – Central de Abasto)
- Mexico City (Cuauhtémoc – La Condesa)
- Mexico City (Alameda Central)

Episode summary

- At the start of this leg, teams were instructed to fly to Mexico City, Mexico. Once there, teams had to travel to the Monumento a la Revolución, where they had to ride the elevator to the top of the monument. There, teams received a video message on a tablet from their loved ones, who informed them of their next destination: Frontón México.
- In this leg's Roadblock, one team member had to play jai alai. Using a wicker scoop, they had to hurl a ball such that it hit the back wall and landed between the third and fifth lines in order to receive their next clue.
- This leg's Detour was a choice between Muertos or Mercado. In Muertos, each team member had to select a Day of the Dead calavera design and perfectly paint their design onto their partner's face in order to receive their next clue. In Mercado, teams had to search the Central de Abasto, the world's largest market, for four marked stalls and purchase cilantro, green chili peppers, onions, tomatoes, and limes. Then, teams had to combine the ingredients to make pico de gallo in order to receive their next clue.
- In a marked house in La Condesa, each team member had to choose one of four telenovela characters to play, memorize a script written entirely in Spanish, and then perform the dramatic scene to the director's satisfaction in order to receive their next clue directing them to the Pit Stop: Alameda Central, overlooking the Palacio de Bellas Artes.

=== Leg 10 (Mexico → New Brunswick) ===
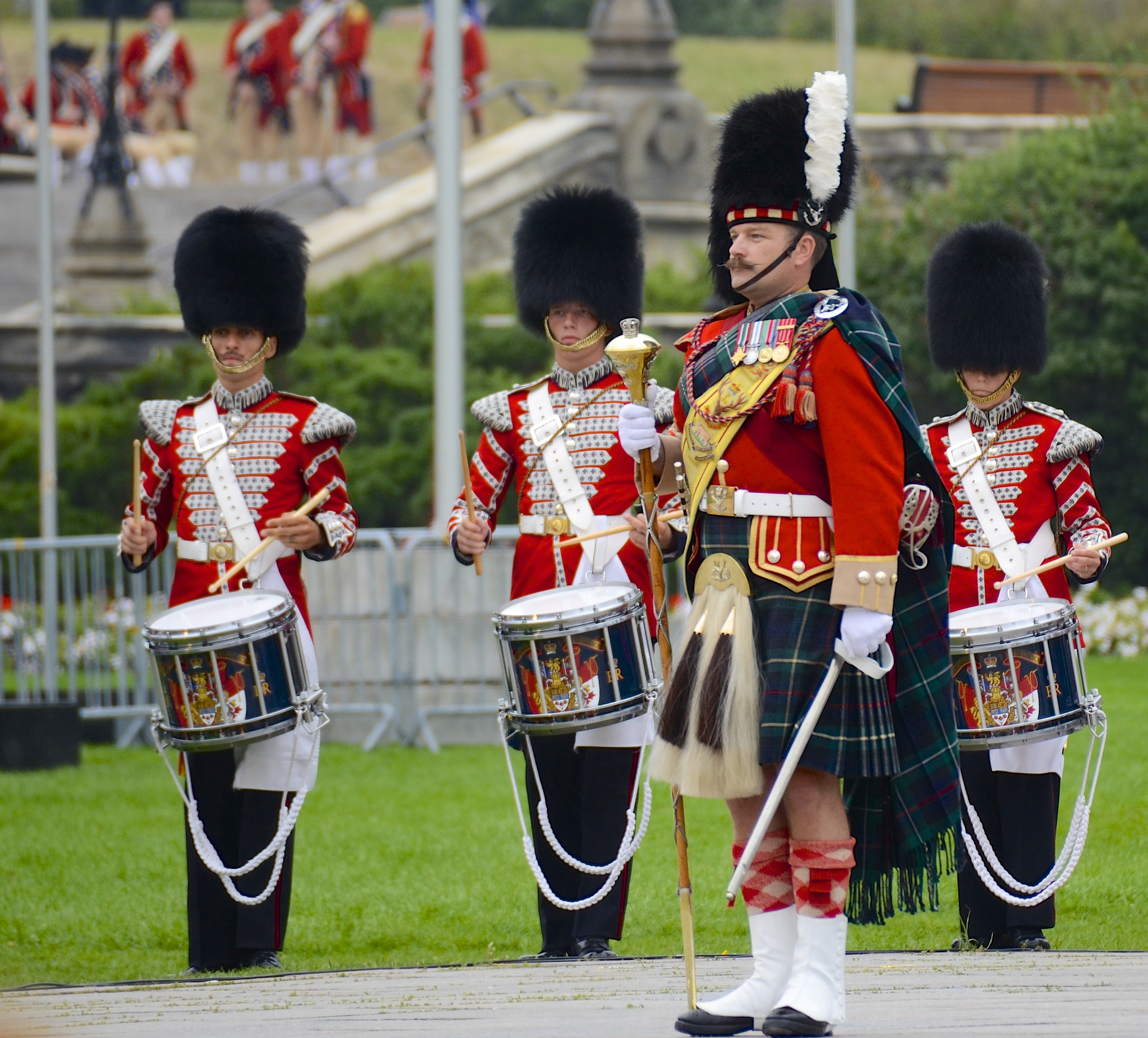
After arriving in Fredericton, teams had to find the one difference between two Ceremonial Guard routines around City Hall.

- Episode 10: "The Plan Is Simple. Win!" (September 4, 2018)
- Prize: A trip for two to Buenos Aires, Argentina (awarded to Taylor & Courtney)
- Eliminated: Martina & Phil

Locations

- Mexico City (Angel of Independence)
- Mexico City → Fredericton, New Brunswick
- Fredericton (Garrison District – Officers' Square & City Hall)
- Oromocto (CFB Gagetown)
- Fredericton (University of New Brunswick – Lady Beaverbrook Gymnasium)
- Fredericton (Beaverbrook Art Gallery)
- Fredericton (Government House)

Episode summary

- At the start of this leg, teams were instructed to fly to Fredericton, New Brunswick. Once there, teams had to travel to Officers' Square, where they had to watch a changing of the guard ceremony. They then had watch a similar ceremony at City Hall, both performed by members of The Royal Canadian Regiment. Teams had to spot the one difference between the two ceremonies – the Ceremonial Guard at Officers' Square took one extra step – and tell the commander in order to receive their next clue.
- This season's final Detour was a choice between Fit or Fly, both with a limit of two stations. In Fit, one team member at a time had to memorize and complete four fitness test exercises: 20-meter rushes, sandbag lifts, intermittent loaded shuttles, and a sandbag drag. If teams could correctly complete the exercises in a combined time of less than 18 minutes, they could receive their next clue. In Fly, teams had to operate a Griffon helicopter flight simulator. They had to navigate a simulation of Downtown Montreal and successfully land on the roof of the Bell Centre in under five minutes in order to receive their next clue.
- For this season's second and final Face Off, teams travelled to the gymnasium at the University of New Brunswick. Teams competed against each other in a game of three-on-three wheelchair basketball using half the court. Each team received one additional player who could pass, but could not block or score. The team with the most points after 15 minutes received their next clue, while the losing team had to wait for another team. The last team remaining at the Face Off had to turn over an Hourglass and wait out a time penalty before moving on.
- In this leg's Roadblock, one team member had to listen to six questions from a Wolastoqiyik elder in Wolastoqey about six paintings inside the Beaverbrook Art Gallery. Team members had to find the paintings that corresponded to each question by observing the paintings' English and Wolastoqey descriptions, and then respond to the questions with the correct Wolastoqey painting title in order to receive their next clue directing them to the Pit Stop: the Government House.

Additional note

- Fredericton Police Chief Leanne J. Fitch as the Pit Stop greeter for this leg.

=== Leg 11 (New Brunswick → Alberta) ===
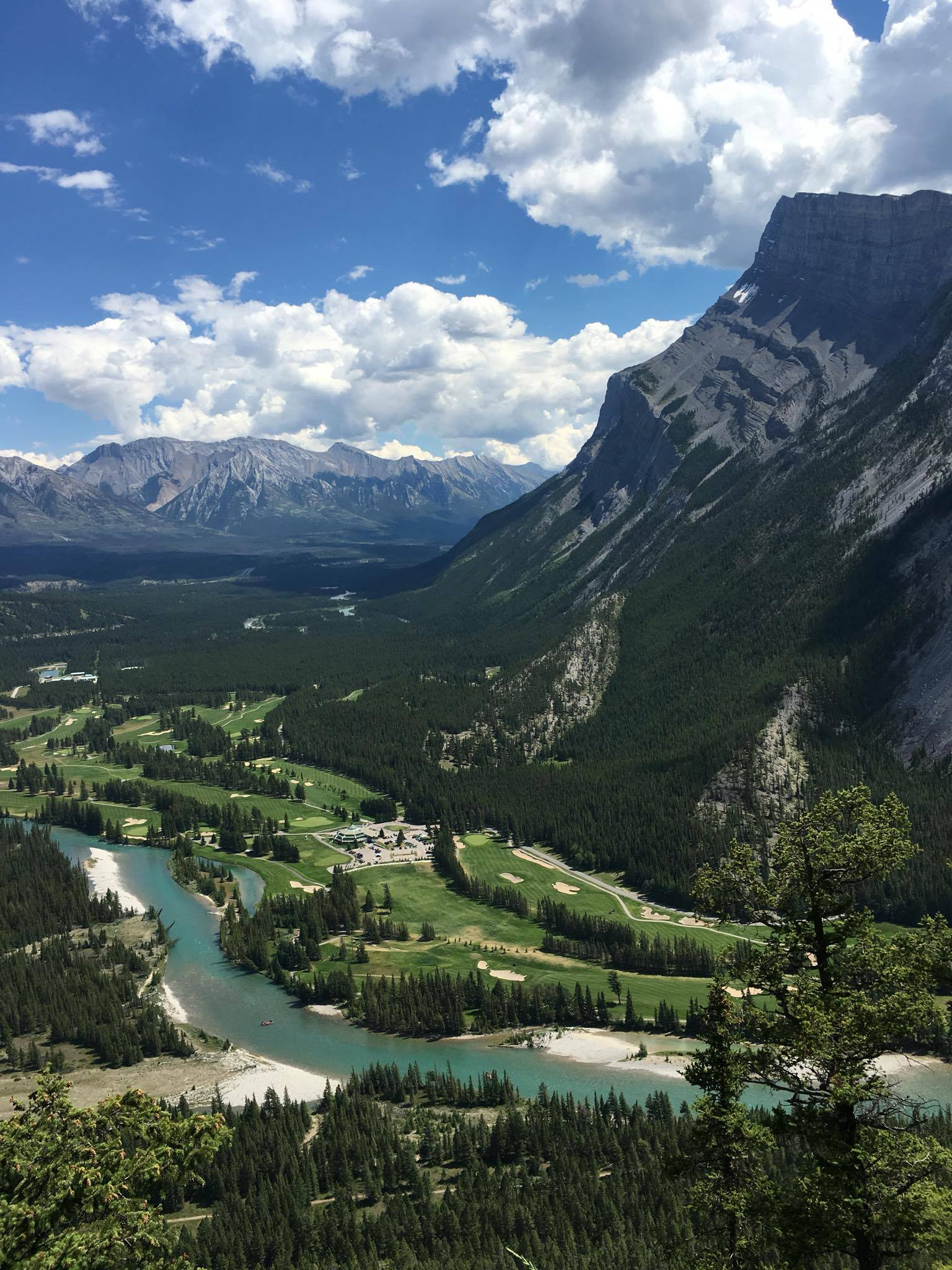
The teams' final task required them to raft along the Bow River in Banff, Alberta, before running to the finish line at Banff Springs Golf Club.

- Episode 11: "The Summer of Heroes" (September 11, 2018)
- Prize: A CA$250,000 cash payout, a trip for two around the world, and a 2018 Chevrolet Traverse Redline for each team member (awarded to Courtney & Adam)
- Winners: Courtney & Adam
- Runners-up: Taylor & Courtney
- Third place: Dylan & Kwame

Locations

- Fredericton (Government House)
- Fredericton → Calgary, Alberta
- Calgary (Calgary International Airport – Airport Traffic Control Tower)
- Calgary (Calgary International Airport – Apron 2) → Kananaskis Country (Mount Fable)
- Kananaskis Country (Mount Fable) → Canmore (Alpine Helicopters Inc.)
- Banff National Park (Sunshine Village)
- Banff (Banff National Park Administration Building & Banff Avenue)
- Banff (Bow River)
- Banff (Fairmont Banff Springs Golf Club – Tunnel Nine Course)

Episode summary

- At the start of this leg, teams were instructed to fly to Calgary, Alberta. Once there, teams had to search near the airport's control tower for their next clue.
- In this leg's first Roadblock, one team member had to enter an air traffic control simulation room and memorize a 30-second automatic terminal information service transmission containing meteorological information surrounding the airport. After memorizing the transmission, team members had to go to the top of the tower and correctly recite the transmission to the Nav Canada senior controller in order to receive their next clue.
- Teams made their way to Apron 2 and travelled by helicopter to Mount Fable. After landing on the mountain's summit, they had to search for their next clue. Teams then took off again and flew to the helicopter's home base in Canmore, and then travelled by taxi to Sunshine Village in Banff.
- In this season's final Roadblock, the team member who did not perform the previous Roadblock had to participate in two winter sports. First, they were harnessed to two dogs and had to ski two laps around a skijoring track. They then had to complete the Slush Cup by sledding down a ski run and across a pool of cold water in order to receive their next clue.
- At Banff National Park Administration Building, teams were directed to search ten marked stores along Banff Avenue for at least two souvenirs that represented items or tasks that they had encountered on each of the eleven legs. Once they had 22 souvenirs, teams had to return to the administration building and place the souvenirs on a display in the correct chronological order in order to receive their next clue. The correct items were:

Correct answers
Leg	Location	Associated souvenirs
1	Squamish, British Columbia	Plush beaver toy, toy ferryboat & plastic miniature crab
2	Yukon	Gold coin & Dawson City scale model house
3	Gulf Islands	Fairy doors, plastic slice of blueberry pie & scale model sports car
4	Jakarta, Indonesia	Flag of Indonesia, National Monument scale model & ondel-ondel statuettes
5	Stratford, Ontario	Stratford City Hall postcard, miniature Elizabethan-era sword & scale model car door
6	Toronto, Ontario	Toronto subway toy car, latte cup & book
7	Winnipeg, Manitoba	Cups and balls magic equipment, Canadian Museum for Human Rights scale model, Royal Canadian Legion badge & dartboard trophy
8	Prince Edward Island	Eckhart mouse, miniature restaurant table and menu & zombie statuettes
9	Mexico City, Mexico	Flag of Mexico, jai alai trophy, Monumento a la Revolución scale model & calavera
10	Fredericton, New Brunswick	Miniature Wolastoqiyik painting, Ceremonial Guard statuette & scale model basketball
11	Banff, Alberta	Toy helicopter & plush Siberian Husky

- Teams then had to ride a zipline across the Bow River and then raft down the river to the Fairmont Banff Springs Golf Club. Once there, teams had to find the finish line at the fifth hole of the Tunnel Nine course.

== Ratings ==
Viewership includes initial date of viewing plus seven day DVR playback.

No.	Title	Air date	Viewers (millions)	Weekly rank	Ref.
1	"Just a Beaver Hero"	July 3, 2018	1.77	1	
2	"Fiddler's Fart"	July 10, 2018	1.60	2	
3	"Sounds Like a Wild Boar"	July 17, 2018	1.81	1	
4	"Just Suck My Blood Please"	July 24, 2018	1.77	1	
5	"You Gotta Whip That Cream"	July 31, 2018	1.65	1	
6	"Smells Like Sweat and Fun"	August 7, 2018	1.87	1	
7	"Poodle Time"	August 14, 2018	1.89	1	
8	"Those Zombies Are Honing In On Us"	August 21, 2018	1.94	1	
9	"The Battle of the Two Courtney's"	August 28, 2018	1.79	1	
10	"The Plan Is Simple. Win!"	September 4, 2018	1.90	1	
11	"The Summer of Heroes"	September 11, 2018	1.99	1	
