= Woodfibre, British Columbia =

Human settlement in British Columbia, Canada

Coordinates: 49°39.8′N 123°15.3′W

Woodfibre, originally Britannia West, was a pulp mill and at one time a small company town, on the west side of upper Howe Sound near Squamish, British Columbia. The mill closed in March 2006.

== History ==
In 1912, a mill opened at the site where Mill Creek empties into Howe Sound. The townsite of Woodfibre was soon constructed at the remote location, which was accessible only by boat.

The community was named by Sir George Bury, president of Whalen Pulp and Paper Company when the mill was built in 1920.

The mill was owned by Alaska Pine and Cellulose Ltd when, in December 1954, that company was purchased by Rayonier Inc. Rayonier operated the mill under the Alaska Pine and Cellulose name until 1959, when the company name was changed to Rayonier Canada, Ltd. Rayonier continued to operate the mill until 1980, when the company exited the pulp business in western Canada and divested the company to Western Forest Products.

Until the 1960s, whole families lived, worked and were partially educated at Woodfibre. At that time, the townsite began to be demolished, and families moved to other nearby communities such as Squamish and Britannia Beach. Mill owner Western Forest Products provided ferry service, by way of the MV Garibaldi II, an identical design to smaller BC Ferries, until the mill's closure in 2006.

In January 2013, Western Forest Products announced that it has entered into a conditional agreement for the sale of its former Woodfibre Pulp Mill site for the purchase price of $25.5 million. The site, consisting of 212 acres (86 ha) of industrial waterfront land, is located at the head of Howe Sound, southwest of Squamish, British Columbia. The net proceeds from the sale are expected to be approximately $17 million

In 2015, the site underwent an environmental assessment for use as a liquefied natural gas plant. That was approved in 2016 and Woodfibre LNG received an export license as well. The $1.6 billion LNG plant was expected to be operational by 2020. In March 2020, construction was delayed until 2021.

Construction work began in June 2022, with site clearance and preparation work being undertaken by Graham Infrastructure on behalf of EPC Contractor McDermott International.

== Hydroelectric Dam ==
In operation since 1947, it generates 2.6 MW of electricity with a single pelton wheel.

== Gallery ==
Woodfibre

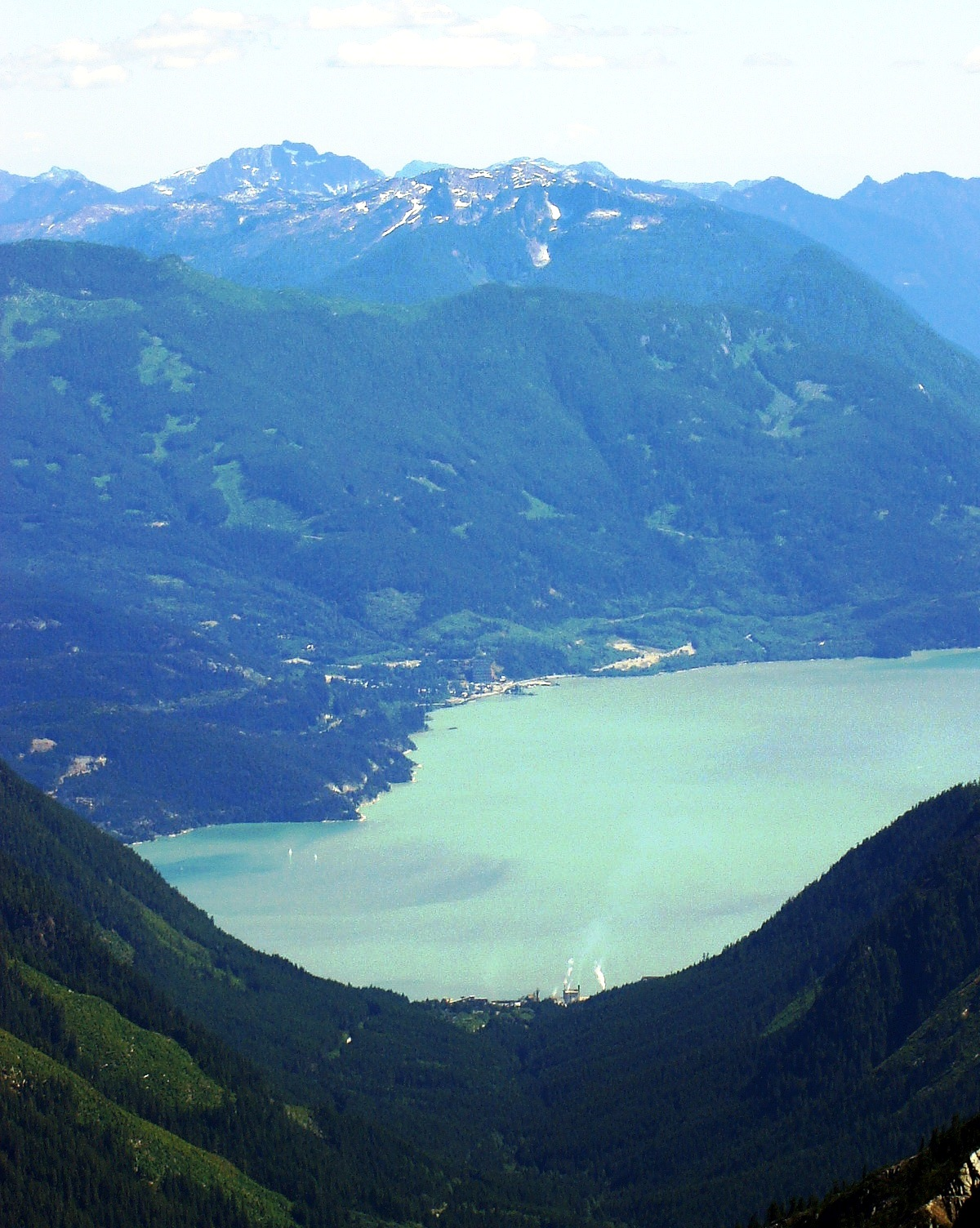
Woodfibre, BC (foreground mill) and Howe Sound. From Mount Roderick.

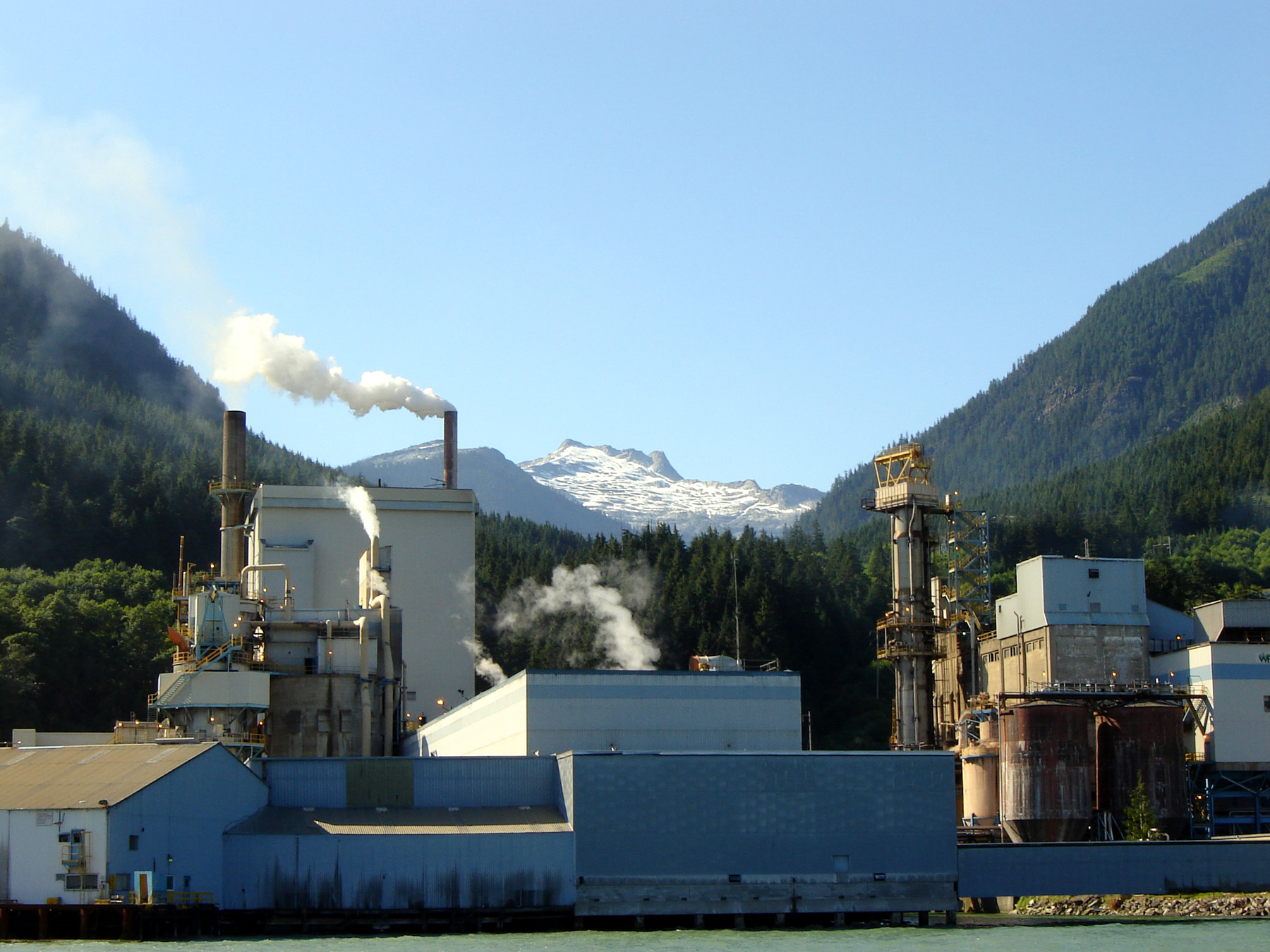
Mill at Woodfibre, BC. Mount Sedgwick, background centre. July, 2005

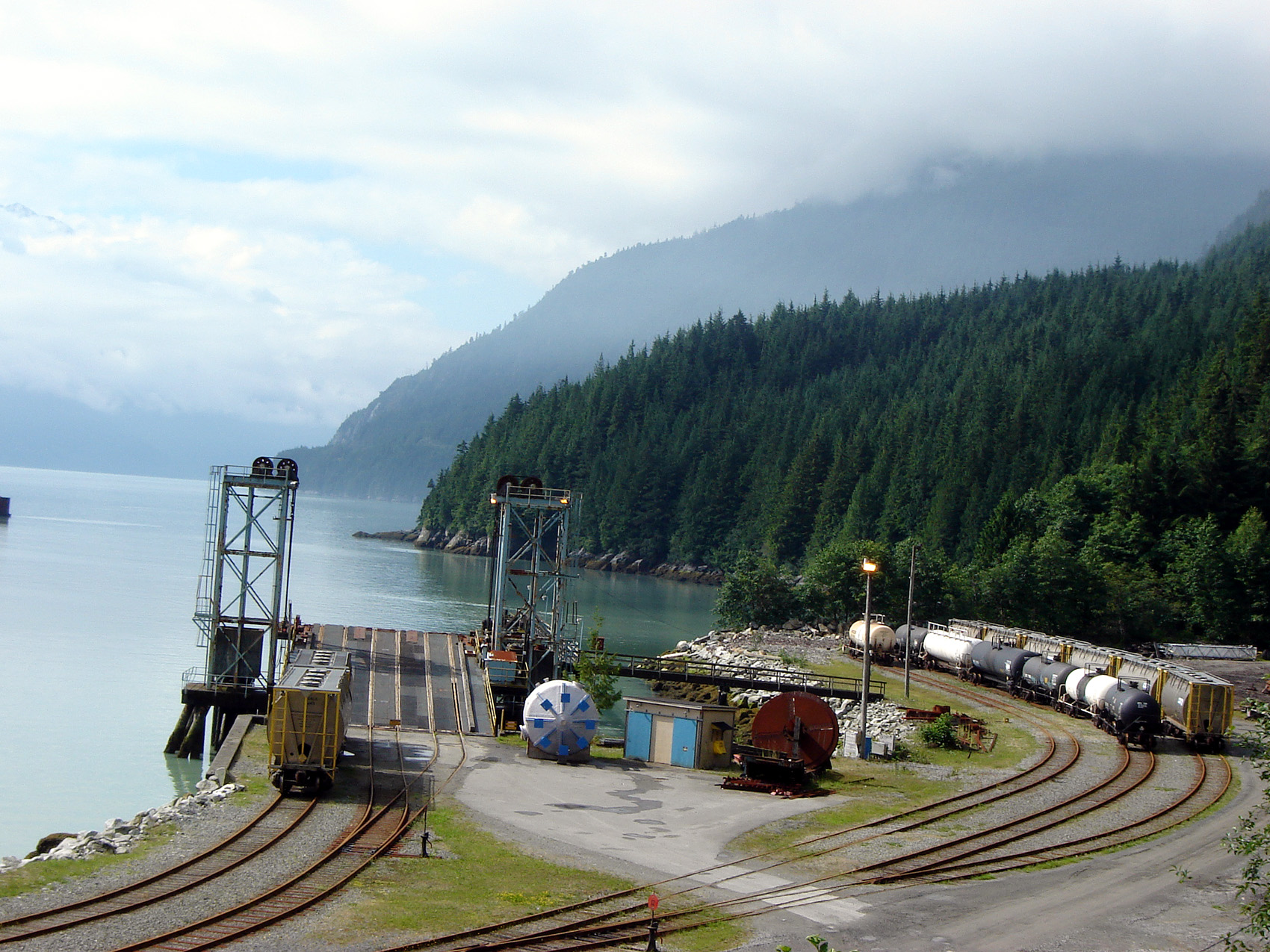
Rail yards and ferry berth at Woodfibre, BC.

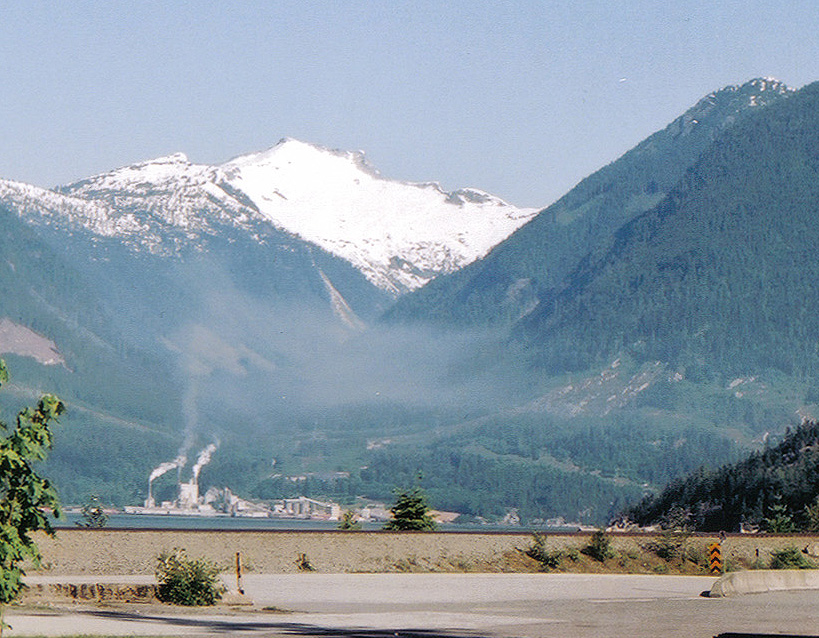
Woodfibre, BC from Britannia Beach. May, 2004

== See also ==
- Darrell Bay
