= Darrell Bay =

- Location of Darrell Bay in British Columbia
- Coordinates: 49°40′00″N 123°10′00″W
- Country: Canada
- Province: British Columbia
- Area codes: 250, 778

Darrell Bay, formerly Shannon Bay, is a bay and associated ferry terminal and unincorporated settlement on the northeast coast of Howe Sound to the south of Squamish, British Columbia, Canada. It is adjacent to Shannon Falls Provincial Park, which lies immediately across BC Highway 99 (the Sea to Sky Highway). Known locally as Shannon Bay until 1949, after William Shannon, one of the original landholders in the vicinity and the namesake of Shannon Falls, it was renamed by the Hydrographic Service as the result of a petition from Darrell Burgess, who owned a fishing camp at this spot (the locality was already known as Burgess Camp, though the bay was Shannon Bay). No reason was indicated why the established local name was not submitted by the Hydrographic Service.

The Darrell Bay Ferry is the only access to and from the former pulp-mill town of Woodfibre, which lies directly across Howe Sound and is now an LNG Plant called Woodfibre LNG.

== See also ==
- Linkspan
