= Stratford City Hall =

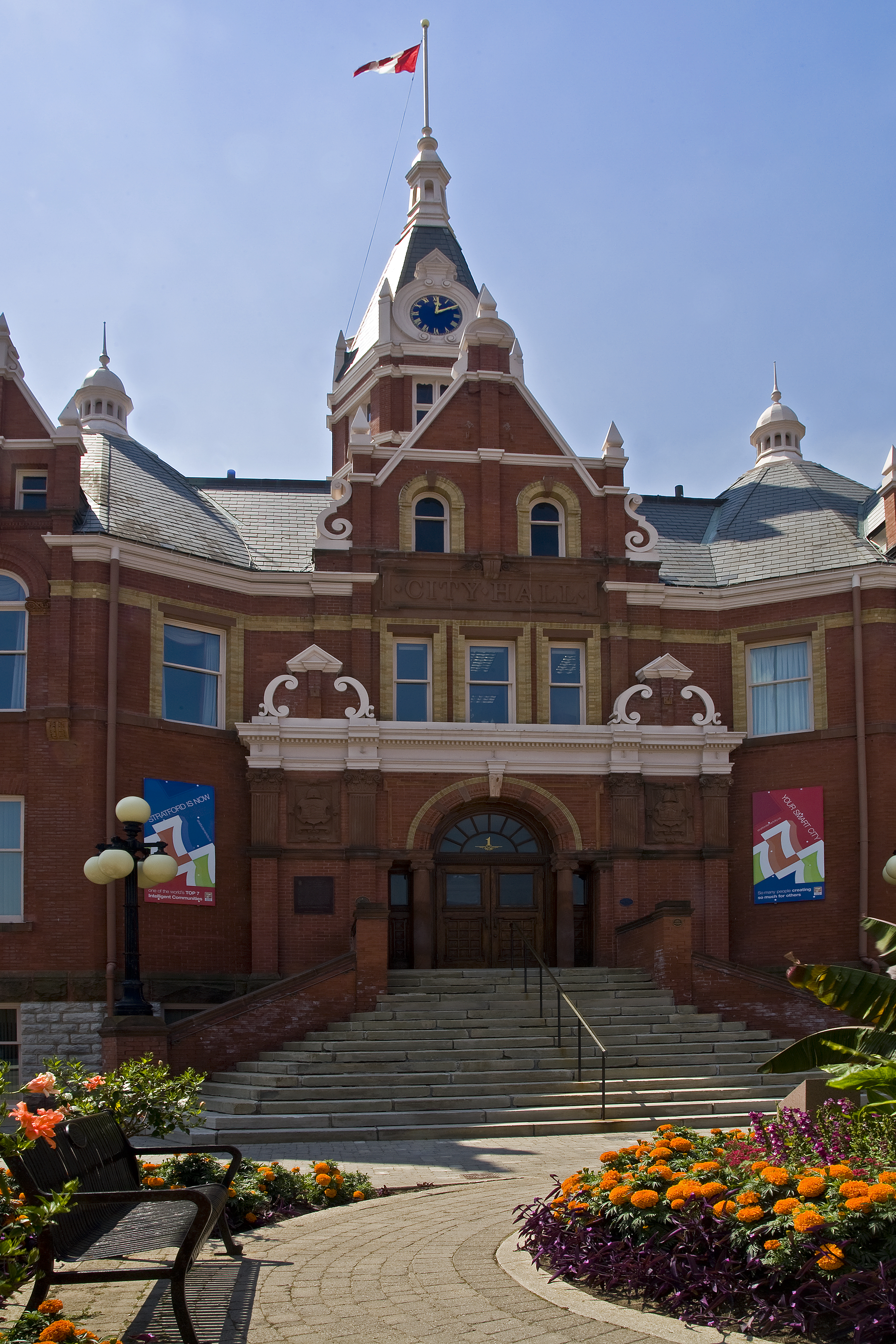
- Interactive map of the Stratford City Hall area

General information
- Type: City hall
- Architectural style: Jacobean/Queen Anne Revival
- Location: Stratford, Ontario, Canada
- Coordinates: 43°22′11.9274″N 80°58′55.9554″W

Design and construction
- Architects: George W. King, John Wilson Siddall

National Historic Site of Canada
- Official name: Stratford City Hall National Historic Site of Canada
- Designated: 6 November 1976

Stratford City Hall is the city hall of Stratford, Ontario, and a National Historic Site of Canada. It sits amidst the city's business district, on a triangular town square.

The original town hall was built in 1856 and incorporated space for market stalls and other stores, in addition to providing space for a concert hall, police station, fire department, and council chambers. The building was destroyed by fire in 1897.

A competition was held for the design of a new city hall, with two winners announced, one incorporating the remains of the previous structure, one for a wholly new building. The latter was selected, and was completed in 1900. The building was designated as a National Historic Site of Canada in 1976.

== First town hall ==
In 1856, the village of Stratford began building a town hall at the tip of a property it had purchased. The stipulation imposed by Donald McDonald for the sale was the development of a market on the land, so the building's ground floor was allocated for business market stalls.

The Neoclassical building consisted of two floors topped by a cupola and bell tower. The ground floor had market stalls at the rear, and four stores at the front with a central entrance opening to a stairway leading to the upper floor. These stores had cellars, and in 1864 one housed a brewery. Behind them were a police station and a fire department; the latter moved to another location in 1893. Above the market stalls was a concert hall, and the upper floor of the front of the building housed the council chamber and municipal offices.

A night constable making his rounds in the early morning of 24 November 1897 discovered a fire. He released the prisoners from their cells and raised the fire alarm. The fire was exacerbated by the ignition of gas in a custodial room, and it eventually destroyed the building.

== New City Hall ==
The city held two design competitions for a new city hall. The competition reusing the remains of the older structure was won by Alexander Hepburn, a local architect, and the design for a new building was won by George W. King of Toronto. The town held a referendum to determine the final design, which was awarded to King and his associate John Wilson Siddall. They hired local contractors Edmund Cawsey and John Lant Young to erect the building. On 2 November 1898, the foundation stone was installed, and in 1900 the building was opened. It is located on a triangular town square.

In March 2016, the city held an open house displaying three proposals to redevelop the land behind the building. The committee selected a proposal by GSP Group, which was approved later at the end of March, and construction began in December 2016.

=== Structure ===
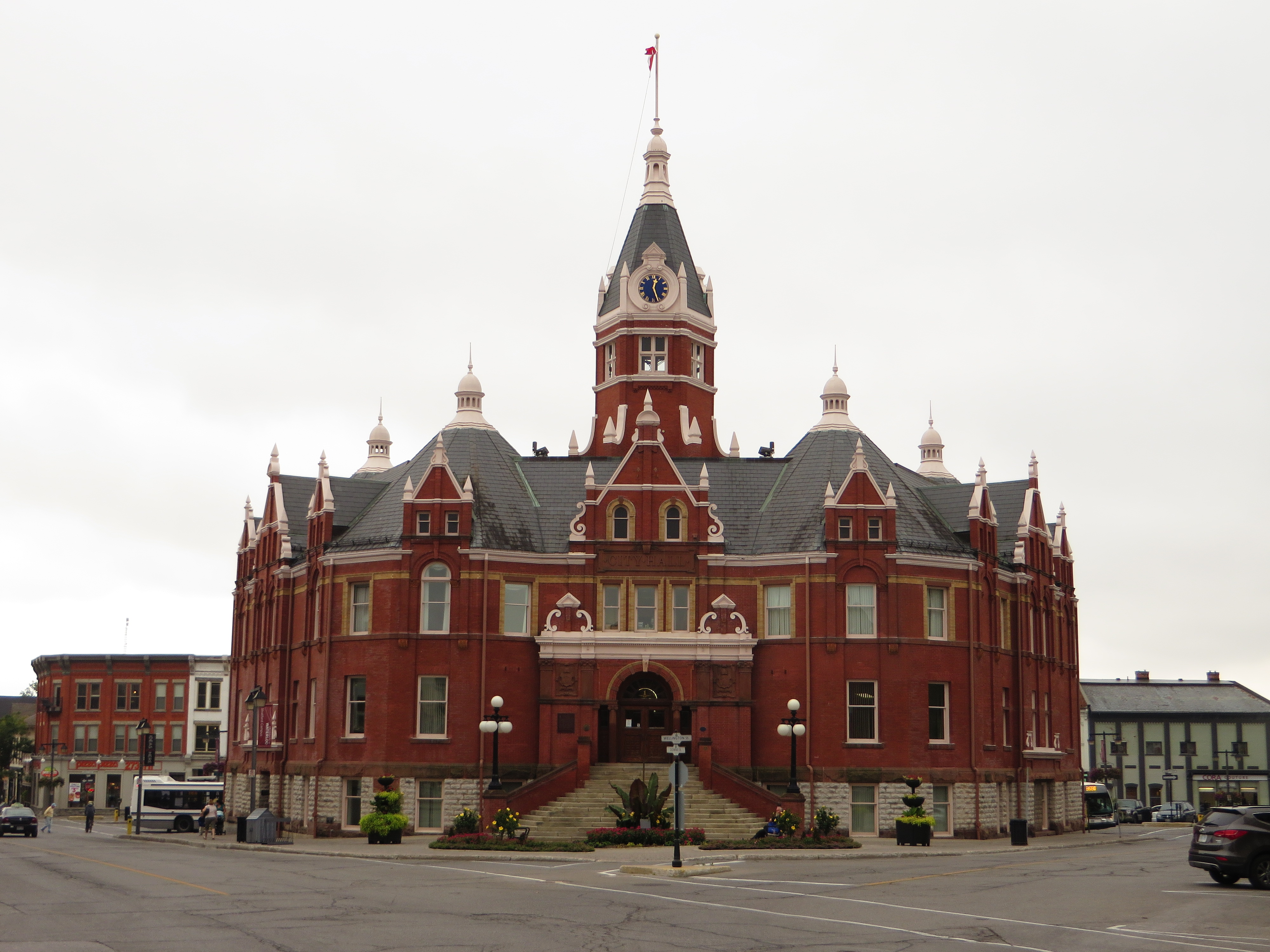
New city hall in 2015

Built in the "Jacobean end" of the Queen Anne Revival style, the building exhibits an eclectic combination of features, including gables in Flemish Renaissance style, a classical cupola, and panelled chimneys. Each end of the building has a dodecagonal base, the central portion a hexagon, and the clock tower a circle. A restoration completed in 1974 updated the auditorium and increased office space.

The exterior brickwork is a dark red, and was the third choice for the building. The architects had planned on using a buff-coloured brick, and city councillors preferred the pale colour of the original town hall. The red was chosen after a local brickyard over-fired its white bricks. The trim is in sandstone, and the large plinth is limestone.

The main entrance is flanked by two terracotta seals, one depicting a train symbolizing industry, and the other depicting a beehive symbolizing enterprise, mounted in pilasters. Above the door is a semi-circular arch window framed by banded voussoirs.

== National Historic Site ==
The building was designated as a National Historic Site of Canada on 6 November 1976, and in 1982, it was designated under the Ontario Heritage Act.

== Legacy ==
The building was used on the cover of a book about Canadian town halls published by Parks Canada. It was described by architect Robert Fairfield, who designed the Stratford Festival Theatre, as a "splendid municipal building".

A proposal to demolish the building and replace it with a ten-storey hotel surmounted by a revolving restaurant was made by the city's mayor C.H. Meier in 1967. City council agreed to demolish the building in 1969, but received a petition from the newly formed "Save the City Hall League" to retain it. By 1972, the plans for the hotel were withdrawn. Some members of "Save the City Hall League" would go on to form Heritage Stratford, the city's heritage committee.

In 2015, a local filmmaker proposed upgrading the auditorium for use as a digital art cinema.
