= Mount Fable =

Mountain in Alberta, Canada

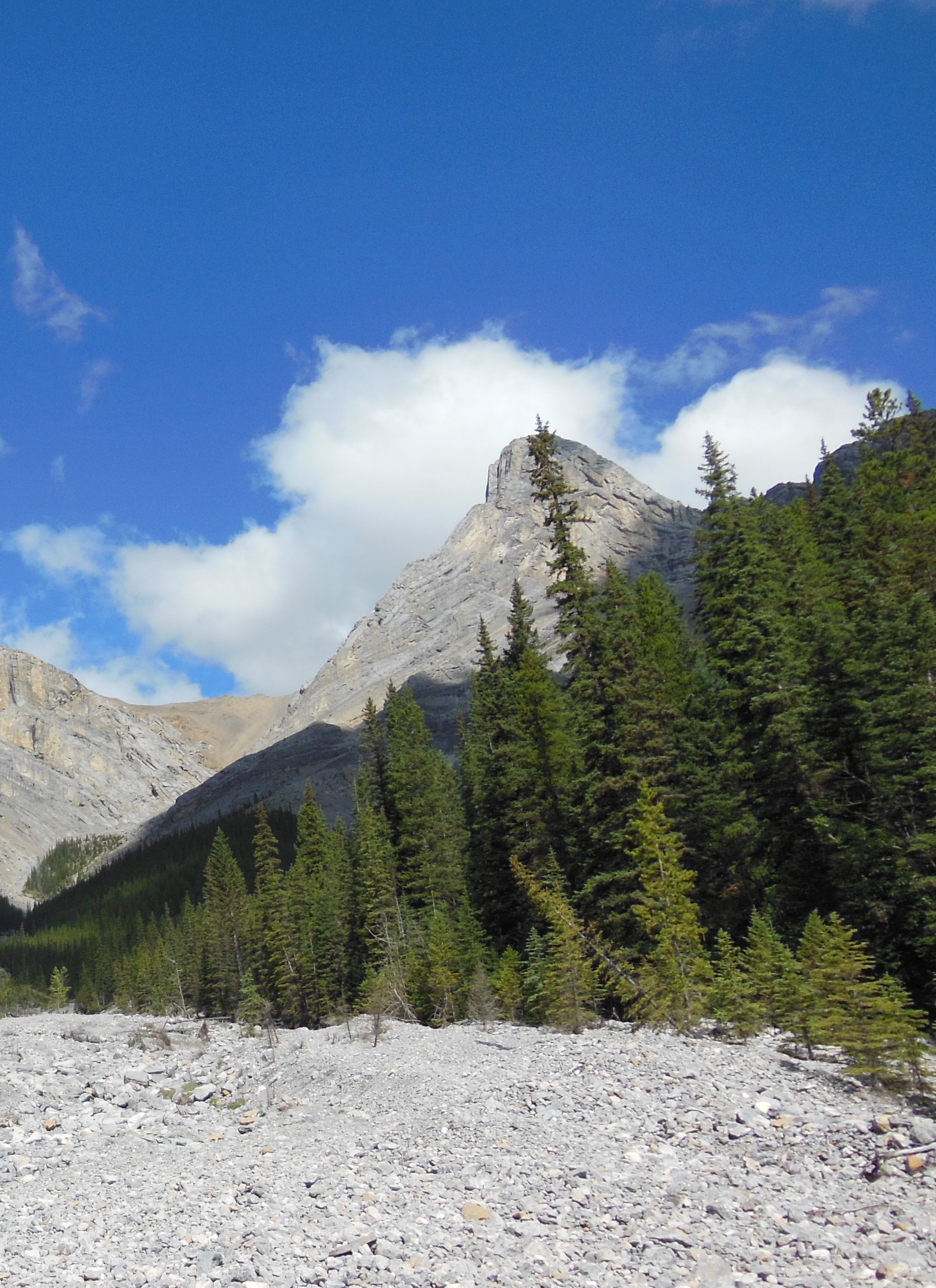
- Mount Fable seen from Exshaw Creek approach

Highest point
- Elevation: 2,702 m (8,865 ft)
- Prominence: 203 m (666 ft)
- Coordinates: 51°07′6″N 115°13′40″W

Geography
- Location within Alberta
- Location: Alberta
- Parent range: Fairholme Range
- Topo map: NTS 82O3 Canmore

Climbing
- First ascent: 1947 by L. Parker, R.C. Hind and J.F. Tarrant
- Easiest route: Scramble on the west face

Mount Fable is located in the Fairholme Range of Alberta. It was first ascended in 1947 by L. Parker, R.C. Hind and J.F. Tarrant. It was named Fable by the first ascent party in reference to a story about heavy bush causing a prior attempt to fail, which they considered a fable.

== See also ==
- Mountains of Alberta
