= Victoria Row =

Mall in Prince Edward Island, Canada

Coordinates: 46.2341°N 63.1265°W

Victoria Row is a street mall in downtown Charlottetown, Prince Edward Island, Canada. It is located on Richmond Street between Queen and Great George Streets. The architecture surrounding the cobblestone street dates back to the Victorian era, and is closed to vehicle traffic during the summer months. It is home to various boutique shops and restaurants and is considered a main tourist attraction in Charlottetown. The 'row' is located immediately due south of the Confederation Centre of the Arts on the west side, and the Province House on the east side, a national historic site. The Cameron Block, a prominent building known for its Italianate architecture style, is a part of Victoria Row.
