= Diamond Tooth Gerties Gambling Hall =

Casino in Dawson City, Yukon, Canada

Coordinates: 64.0615°N 139.4302°W

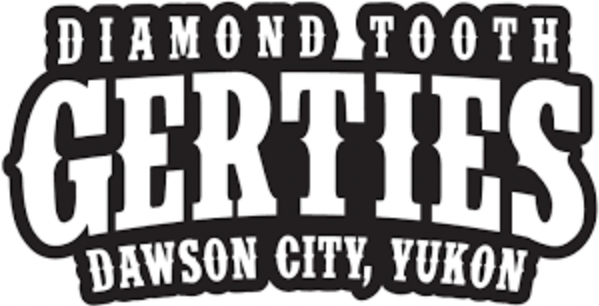
- Interactive map of Diamond Tooth Gerties Gambling Hall
- Location: Corner of Fourth Avenue and Queen Street, Dawson City, Yukon Y0B 1G0
- Opened: 1971
- Theme: Klondike Gold Rush
- Gaming space: 8,000 sq ft (740 m^{2})
- Permanent shows: Vaudeville show
- Notable restaurants: Big Al's
- Casino type: Land-based
- Owner: Klondike Visitors Association
- Website: diamondtoothgerties.ca

Diamond Tooth Gerties Gambling Hall is a casino in Dawson City, Yukon, Canada. It was first opened in 1971 by the Klondike Visitors Association, making it Canada's oldest casino. Gerties, as it is popularly known, is reminiscent of the area's Klondike Gold Rush history. The casino hosts a daily vaudeville show inspired by one of Dawson's most famous dancehall stars from the Gold Rush era, Gertie Lovejoy, who had a diamond between her two front teeth.

== Overview ==
As the only casino located in northern Canada, it is still operated by the Klondike Visitors Association, a non-profit organization. Revenues are re-invested back into the town to help preserve historic sites, produce local events, and promote the Klondike. In 2015, it was declared a Municipal Heritage Site.

== Arctic Brotherhood Hall ==
The building that houses Gerties was formerly known as Arctic Brotherhood Hall. It was built in 1901 in three weeks by the Arctic Brotherhood, which was a fraternal social organization for men living in the northwest section of North America. Camp No. 4 of the Arctic Brotherhood was formed in November 1899 in Dawson City. When it was completed, the building was regarded as the largest and grandest building in the northwest. In 1925, the Arctic Brotherhood ceased to exist and soon after, the Fraternal Order of Eagles moved in. Eventually, the building was turned into a community hall. In 1967, the building was renovated and briefly renamed to Centennial Hall in honour of Canada's 100th birthday. In 1971, the town leased the building to the Klondike Visitors Association, who were running casino nights on the S.S. Keno after they had obtained a special gambling license from the Government of Canada.

== Games ==
Among the available games are blackjack ($5–$100 bets), roulette, poker, 64 slot machines, and red dog poker. They also have a game called money wheel, that features Canadian bills.

== See also ==
- Diamond Tooth Lil, a Gold Rush-era American popular cultural icon of wealth and libertine burlesque
