= Mayestik Market =

Coordinates: 6.2408074°S 106.7910194°E

Mayestik Market (Indonesian: Pasar Mayestik) is a modern traditional market at Kebayoran Baru, in Jakarta, Indonesia. Drugs and cosmetics, jewelry, clothing and tailors, vegetables and fruits, meat and fish, book store, sports equipment, almost everything needed for daily life are available in this market.

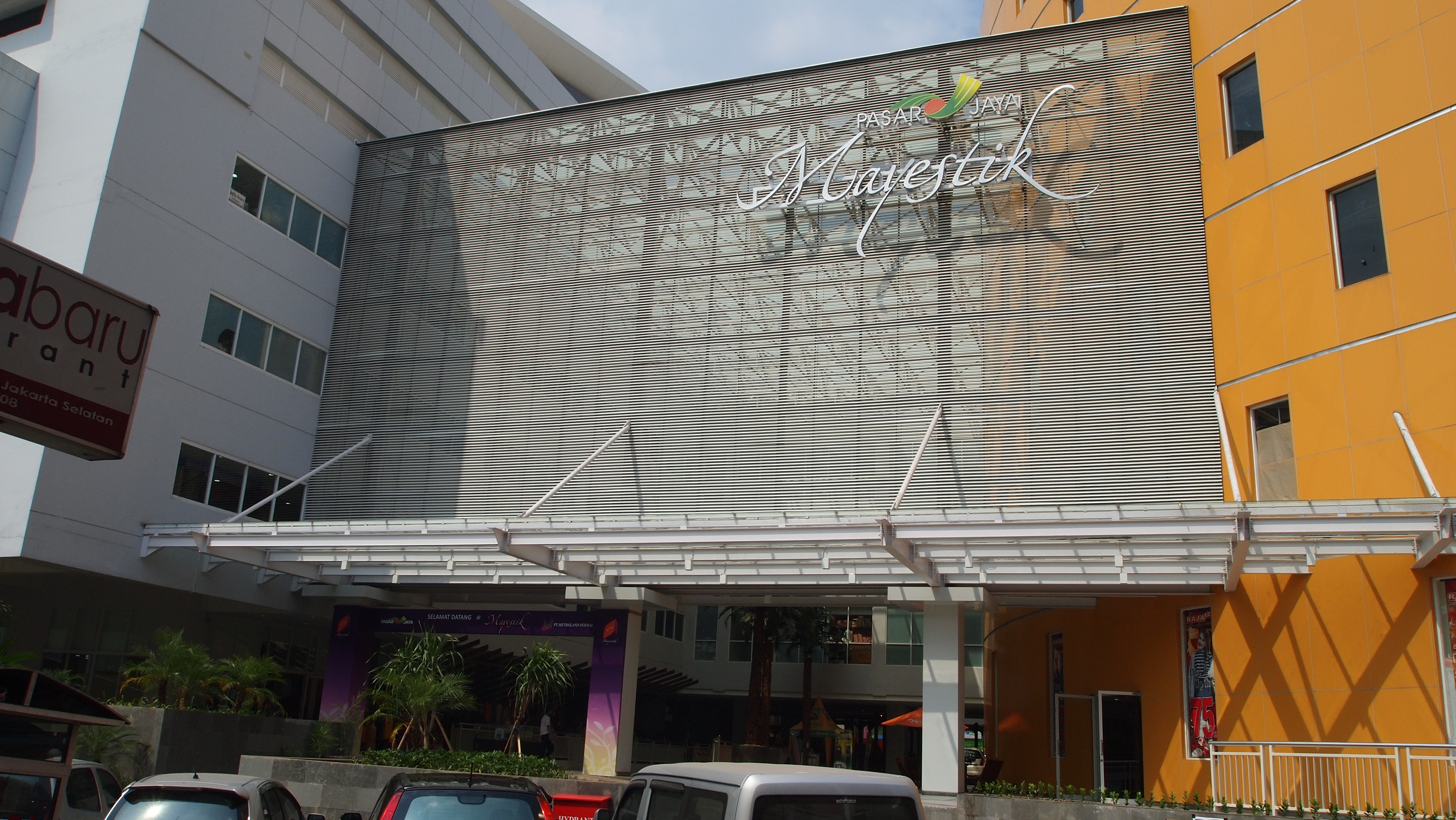
West side entrance gate of Pasar Mayestik

== History ==
This market was present since the 1950s, though it was officially inaugurated in 1981. While the Kebayoran Baru area began to be built in the late 1940s as one of the new satellites in Jakarta, the Mayestik area was the location of the halls of residence. A row of neat houses, shady trees, beautiful surroundings neatly arranged. If it was once on the edge, now Kebayoran Baru.

In 2010, renovation of the market started and on June 16, 2012, was inaugurated by then Governor of DKI Jakarta Fauzi Bowo.

== Facilities ==
The main building is located in the middle of the area of a 10-story building and is also surrounded by many ruko (shop houses). The market has 2,279 stalls. It is equipped with AirConditioner (AC), standard fire protection equipment, escalator, elevator, sound system, CCTV security, alarm systems, parking facilities, toilets and places of worship., as well as free WiFi service.

Pasar Mayestik is famous for textiles. Everything related to fabrics, costume making, crafting, and sewing supplies (buttons, zippers, ribbons, and appliqués) are available in this market. There are also a number of textile shops owned by Indian Indonesians. Floor arrangement of the market is as follows,

- Basement floor: vegetables, ready-to-use spice, meat & poultry, bakery goods, food stalls, plastics, and household stuffs
- Semi-basement floor: glassware, plastic ware, beauty products and tools, shoes, sandals, ready-to-use jamu (Indonesian traditional herbal drink), handicrafts
- Ground floor: ready made garments, textiles
- Mezzanine floor: curtain kiosks, Batik, fabrics
- 1st floor: Jewelry
- 2nd floor: tailor kiosks, sequins, embroideries, advertising plaques
- P1 floor: food court
- P2 floor: marketing office
- P3 floor: management office
- P4 floor: mosque

== Transportation ==
Pasar Mayestik is located on Jalan Tebah, Kebayoran Baru, South Jakarta, near Pertamina Central Hospital and Taman Puring flea market. It can be reached by TransJakarta Corridor 13 via Mayestik BRT station.
