= Britannia Mines Concentrator =

Historic site in British Columbia, Canada

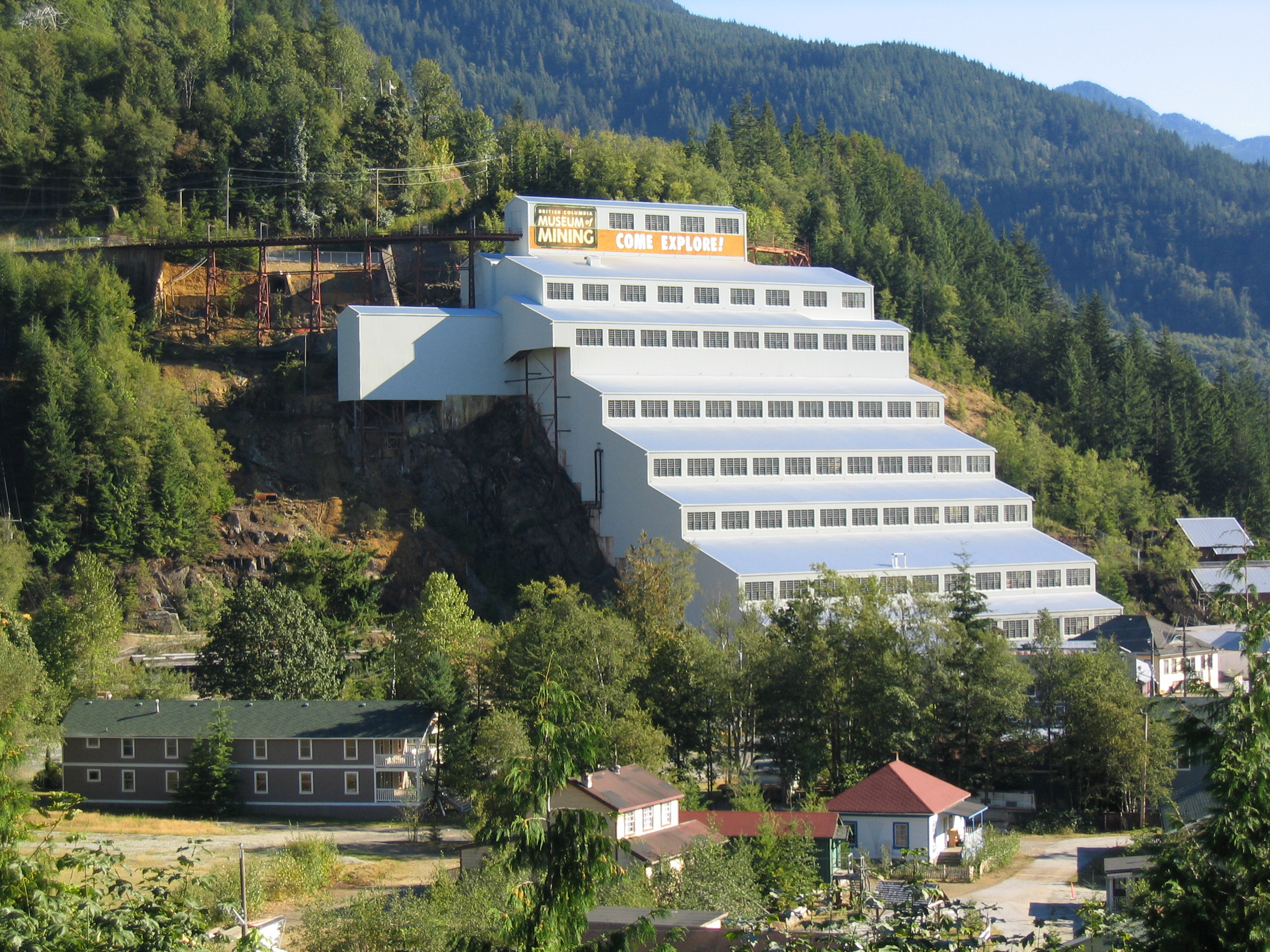
- The 1923 steel concentrator building at Britannia Beach.
- Interactive map of the Britannia Mines Concentrator area

General information
- Classification: Mining
- Location: Britannia Beach. British Columbia, Canada
- Coordinates: 49.6226°N 123.2039°W
- Completed: January 1923

Height
- Height: 210 feet (64 m)

National Historic Site of Canada
- Official name: Britannia Mines Concentrator National Historic Site of Canada
- Designated: 20 November 1987

The Britannia Mines Concentrator is a National Historic Site of Canada. The large, inclined gravity mill was built on the northwest side of Mount Sheer to assist the transfer of copper ore through the chemical and mechanical processes of the plant. It is a landmark in Britannia Beach, British Columbia some forty-five kilometers north of Vancouver.

The nearby volcanic peak of Mount Garibaldi indicates the presence of magmatic inclusions and volcanic cores, in which copper is usually found. As such, the town and mill sit on the western shore of the Britannia Range and defined by the large fjord of Howe Sound.

The mining claims were discovered in the 1880s and the Britannia Beach Mining and Smelting Company established in the Edwardian years. Copper was first mined in the area in 1903 and the distance from smelters necessitated the construction of an ore concentrator, a system to deliver ore, and a system to ship the ore concentrate. A primitive concentrator, No. 1, was built in 1904, which was upgraded with two more units, collective known as No.2, built in 1914 and 1915. A fire in 1921 destroyed these, and a concrete and steel structure to house a new concentrator was completed (immediately to the right of the 1914 plant) in early 1923. In the late 1920s, Britannia Mines was the most productive copper mine in the British Empire, and it also produced silver and gold.

Now owned by the Britannia Mine Museum Society, it is part of the Britannia Mine Museum.

== Background ==
In the late 1880s prospectors from Texada Island had surveyed the area for gold, one of them Dr. A. Forbes, then staked claims. It was not until 1898 that trappers among them Oliver Furry, of Furry Creek fame, discovered sulphided copper ore in a mineralized schist. A set of mining claims were made, eventually leading to the establishment of Britannia Mining and Smelting Company, which included claims for mines at four sites named Bluff, Empress, Fairview, and Jane.

Britannia Mines began mining copper ore from Mount Sheer and the surrounding area on the eastern shore of Howe Sound in 1903. Because the ore contained relatively little copper, an ore concentrate was produced before shipment to an ore processing plant. This necessitated the construction of a concentrator, and both an inclined and aerial tramway system to transport crushed ore from the mine to the concentrator. In 1904, a gravity concentrator was installed at the site, capable of processing 200 tons of ore daily. The output was a concentrate of about 10% copper, which was sent to Crofton for smelting. The first shipment was made in December 1905. A holding company called the Howe Sound Company held Britannia Beach Mining and Smelting Company. The Howe Sound Company also owned some mines on Mt. Sicker and a smelter at Crofton near Ladysmith.

Most of the high-grade ore at Britannia Beach had been mined and milled by 1912. To maintain profitability, the mining operation was expanded to mine low-grade ore, requiring a new wooden concentrator. This was installed as two parts, each made of timber, the first in 1914 and the second in 1915. Its design implemented a new flotation technique that had been tested in the original concentrator in 1912. A ground level inclined railway was built to lower the ore down from the Jane Basin mine.

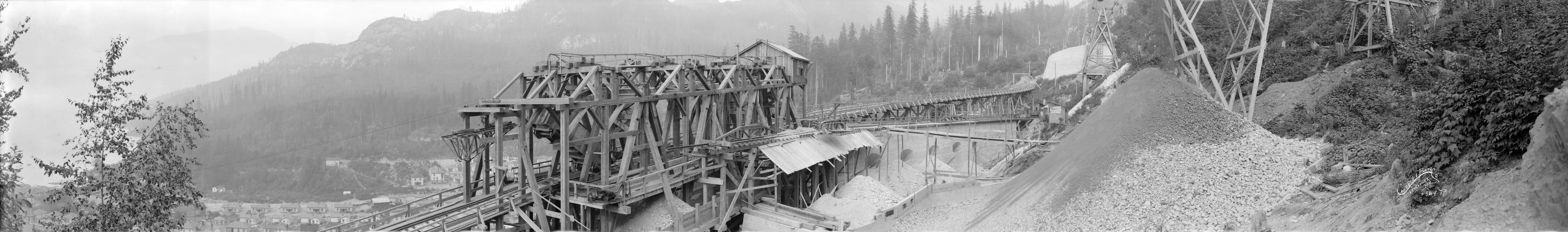
The busy top of the second concentrator looking north about 1914. A cable tram brought ore down from the Jane Basin mine portal where it was sorted, waste rock removed, sifted and ore laden material fed into the grinders and vats below.
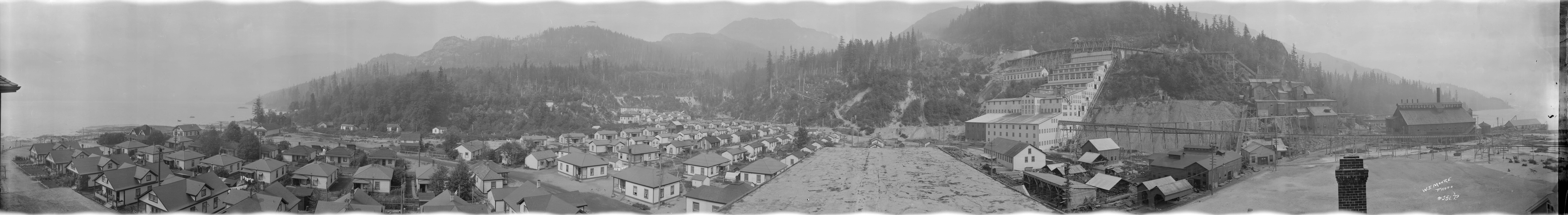
Britannia Beach town site (left) in August 1917. The imposing structure (middle right) is the concentrator building constructed in 1914. Near the third row of windows from the bottom is an electric, narrow gauge railway along which ore concentrate would travel to ore bins and then be loaded onto a waiting ship at the dock (far right).

Between the years 1905 and 1915 the mine increased production by a factor of ten. Disaster struck on March 22, 1915, when a huge landslide killed 56 people, Canada's second largest landslide disaster after 1903 Frank Slide. Much of this was due to the outbreak of the First World War and the demand for copper shell casings and bullet jackets. The Imperial Munitions Board, a overseeing and purchasing body, received most of the copper. To further this expansion, the mine kept expanding with more plant and workers. Also, more houses had to be built to keep them. At its peak, the mine employed 900 men. In this period the ore stopped shipment to Crofton and was sent to the ASARCO smelter in Tacoma.

In the winter of 1921, a fire spread throughout the concentrator building, destroying it and terminating mining operations. Fortunately, fire crews managed to save the pelton wheel powered, hydro electric plant—a small one story structure that sat right beside No.2 Concentrator. (The mine generated half of its power needs, and the other half came from BC Electric which strung a power line to the mine up the Capilano Valley,) A temporary decline in copper prices provided the company with an incentive to upgrade the concentrator, and it hired San Francisco metallurgical engineering firm Bradley, Bruff, and Labarthe to design a new structure to house it.

== Expansion ==
In 1922, Britannia Mines began building a new gravity concentrator capable of processing 2,500 tons of ore daily. The monolithic concrete and steel structure to house it, No. 3 Concentrator, was completed in January 1923 on the northwest side of Mount Sheer, and by 1925 Britannia Mines produced more copper ore concentrate than any other mining operation in the British Empire, a distinction it held until 1930. During this time it also produced "significant amounts of silver and gold". The No. 1 Concentrator, which sat adjacent to the mine wharf, was dismantled.

To feed the large new works, dozens of miles of tunnels were cut to ore bodies. The adits stretch high into the mountains and down in the mountain below sea level. Large fans for ventilation, electric lights, pumps and air drills assisted the work.

At No. 3 Concentrator, ore was crushed and pulverised in ball mills. It was then ground into a powder and run through separation machines and flotation mills. After, it was graded and dried. Ore concentrate is roughly 40 percent metal and needs to go to a smelter for further refining.

Britannia Beach was a company town with its own company store. Workers lived in town and were unable to leave except by scheduled Union Steamship Company boat. Highway 99 was not completed until 1955. The company was very strict with its workers and difficult to work for. The company was unionized only after the war, in 1946. Men had few safety precautions and used hard rock air drills without ear protection. Britannia Beach miners would often go deaf, receiving no compensation.

== Description ==
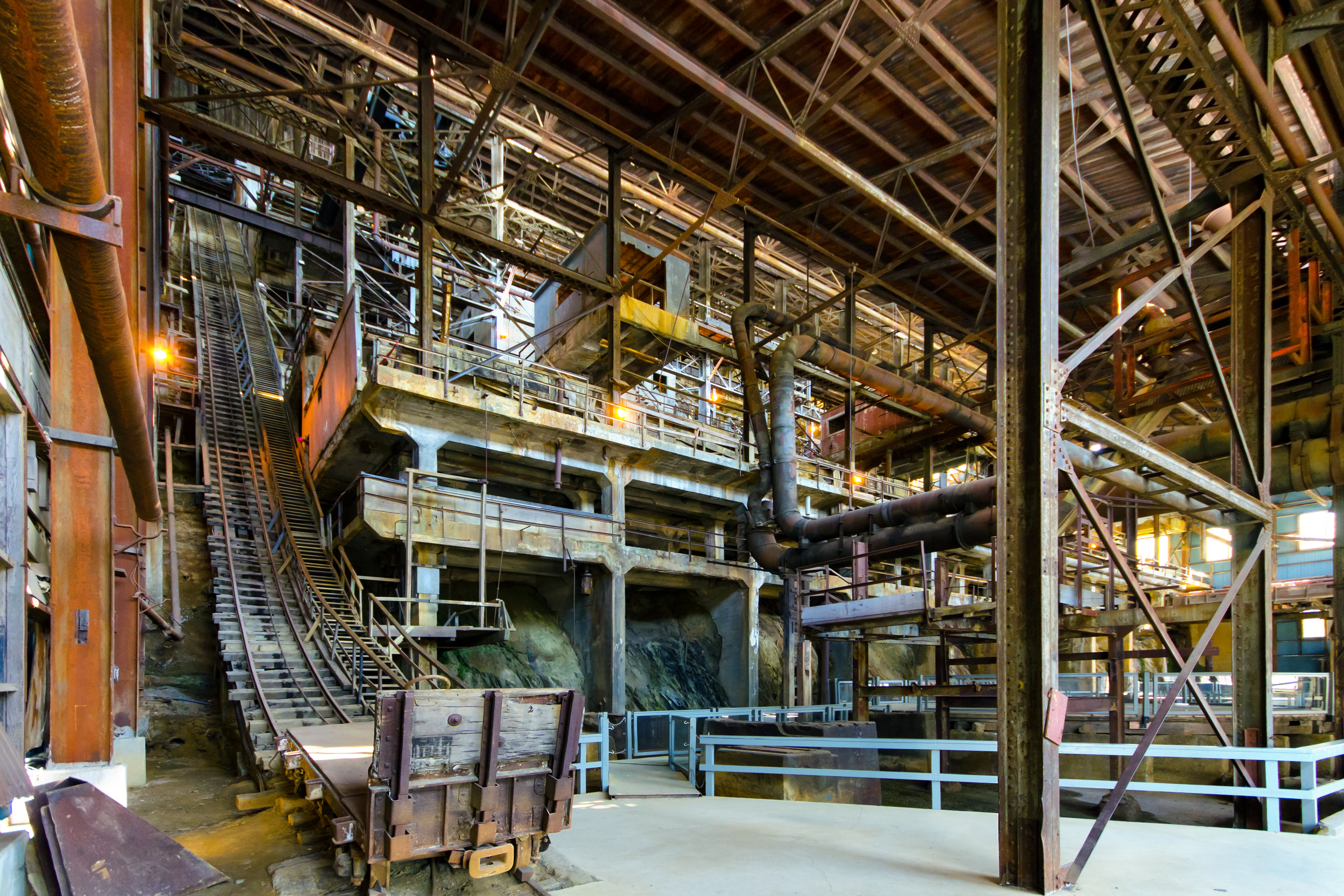
The gravity-fed concentrator

The 20-storey building dominates its site, its windows facing northwest into Howe Sound. The building is roughly rectangular, with a base about 209 feet (64 m) wide and 271 feet (83 m) deep. Each level is between 50 and 70 feet (15 and 21 m). A ventilation shed added in 1926 protrudes from the top.

The mill received ore at its peak, 230 feet (70 m) from its base, where it entered the concentrator. It passed down stages of the concentrator by gravity, through eight levels of the structure. From the bottom level, it was piped directly into the hold of a cargo ship.

Britannia Beach remained in operation until 1974. Many of its business records are held by the UBC Special Collections.

== National Historic Site ==
Britannia Mines Concentrator, part of the Britannia Mines Museum

The Britannia Mines Concentrator is owned by the Britannia Beach Historical Society, and is part of the Britannia Mine Museum.

The industrial building has become the setting for several films and television programs.
