= Britannia Beach landslide disaster =

1915 landslide in Canada

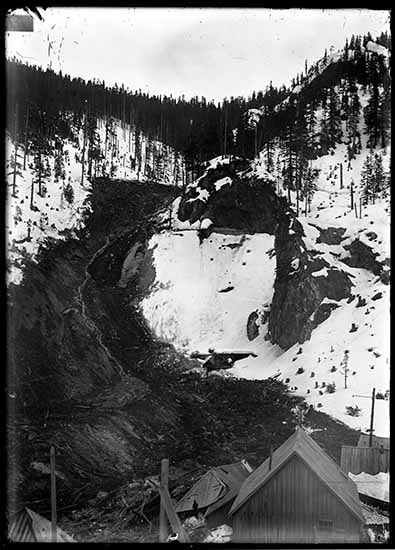
- Britannia Beach Jane camp after March 21, 1915 landslide
- Date: February 17, 2006
- Time: Just after midnight March 22, 1915
- Location: Britannia Beach, Vancouver, BC, Canada
- Deaths: 56

On March 22, 1915, a landslide slammed into the mining community burying 56 men, women and children under 15 metres (49 ft) of debris. It is Canada's second largest landslide disaster after 1903 Frank Slide that killed more than 70 people.

== Background ==
A copper discovery on Britannia Mountain by Dr. A. A. Forbes in 1888 led to the development of the Britannia Mine. In 1912 John Wedderburn Dunbar Moodie was authorized to upgrade the operation and increase production from the mine. Improvements in the mineral separation processes stimulated plans for a new mill (No. 2) and was capable of producing 2000 tons of ore per day. In 1914, the onset of World War I increased the demand for copper and the price rose sharply. The mine was far up a mountain and a community, Jane Camp, sprang up 5.5 kilometres (3.4 mi) up above Britannia Beach.

== Disaster ==
On March 22, 1915, a rock avalanche of 100,000 m^{3} destroyed the Jane Camp. The exact time the landslide hit is unknown but about 12:45 a.m. workers down the mountain knew something was wrong when hoppers that workers were supposed to be filled with ore at Jane Camp were arriving empty at the bottom of the mountain.

In the years after the disaster scientists have been able to pore over the evidence and Geologists like S.G. Evans have come to the conclusion that the slide “originated as a rock slope failure from the northeast side of Mammoth Bluffs, above the portal of the Bluff Mine (beside Jane Camp).”

56 men, women and children were killed and it was a terrible blow to the tiny community. Construction began immediately on a new, safer town at the 2,200-foot (670 m) level above the Britannia Beach site. This portion of the community became known as the "Town site" or "Mount Sheer".

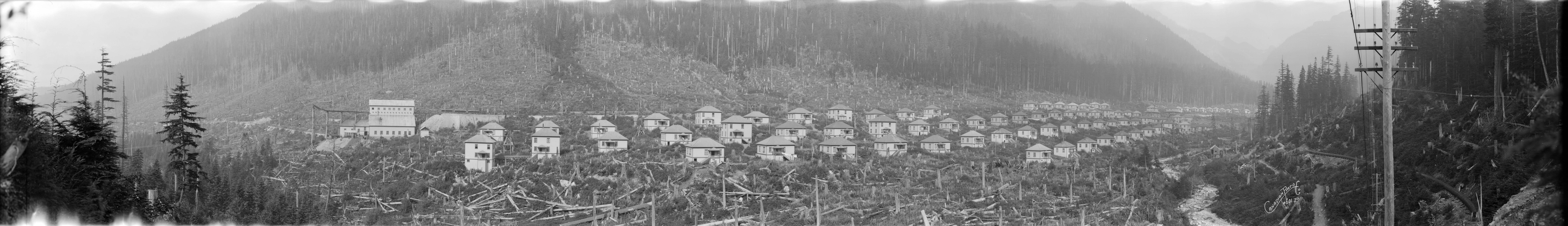
Mount Sheer or Upper town mining camp sits in a hanging valley of Mount Sheer above Britannia Beach, 9 September 1919. It was built to replace the destroyed Jane Camp

== Bibliography ==
Notes

References

- Brennan, C. V. (1935). Mining operations at the property of the Britannia Mining and Smelting Co., Ltd., Britannia Beach, British Columbia. Mining operations at the property of the Britannia Mining & Smelting Co., LTD., Britannia Beach, British Columbia. [Washington, D.C.] hdl:2027/mdp.39015077568403.
- Mackie, John (March 19, 2015). "THIS WEEK IN HISTORY: 1915 Britannia Mountain disaster". Vancouver Sun.
- Monger, J. W. H. (1994). Geology and Geological Hazards of the Vancouver Region, Southwestern British Columbia. Geological Survey of Canada. ISBN 9780660157849. - Total pages: 316
