= Image Engine =

Canadian visual effects studio based in Vancouver, British Columbia

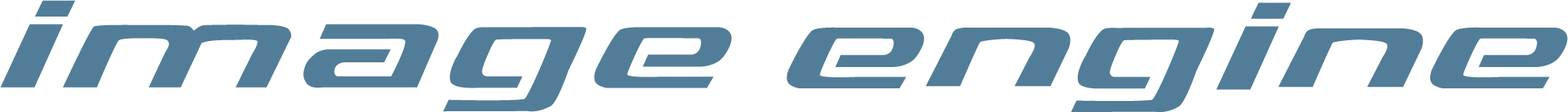
- Type: Private
- Industry: Visual effects
- Founded: 1995; 31 years ago
- Founder: Christopher Mossman, Robin Hackl, Gregory Holmes
- Headquarters: 2043 Quebec Street; Vancouver, British Columbia; V5T 2Z6
- Key people: Shawn Walsh
- Number of employees: 250–400
- Parent: Cinesite (2015–present)
- Website: www.image-engine.com

Image Engine (also known as Image Engine Design Inc.) is a Canadian visual effects studio based in Vancouver, British Columbia, that offers a range of services for feature films and television, from concept designs and pre-visualization to CGI animation, compositing, and explosive volumetric digital effects.

Their work includes contributions for the films and series District 9, The Mandalorian, Game of Thrones, Lost in Space, Jurassic World, and Elysium. In 2022, they won a Creative Arts Emmy Award for Outstanding Special Visual Effects In A Season Or A Movie for The Book of Boba Fett.

In July 2015, they partnered with Cinesite. Other partner companies include Trixter, Squeeze, L'Atelier, FX3X, Assemblage, and the Imaginarium Studios.

== Credits ==
=== 2020s ===
Year	Films / Television Series
2025	Tron: Ares
2025	Gabby's Dollhouse: The Movie
2025	The Old Guard 2
2025	Murderbot
2025	The Residence
2025	The Gorge
2024	Dune: Prophecy (Season 1)
2024	Sonic the Hedgehog 3
2024	Kraven the Hunter
2024	Alien: Romulus
2024	Snowpiercer (Season 4)
2024	3 Body Problem (Season 1)
2024	Star Wars: Skeleton Crew
2024	Avatar: The Last Airbender (Season 1)
2024	Halo (Season 2)
2024	Lift
2023	Leave The World Behind
2023	Foundation (Season 2)
2023	Star Wars: Ahsoka season 1
2023	The Mandalorian season 3
2022	Willow
2022	The School for Good and Evil
2022	Obi-Wan Kenobi
2022	Fantastic Beasts: The Secrets of Dumbledore
2022	Moon Knight
2022	Snowpiercer (Season 3)
2021	The Book of Boba Fett
2021	Swan Song
2021	The Unforgivable
2021	Hawkeye
2021	Venom: Let There Be Carnage
2021	Chaos Walking
2021	Snowpiercer (Season 2)
2020	The Mandalorian season 2
2020	Mulan
2020	The Twilight Zone (Season 2)
2020	Project Power
2020	The Old Guard
2020	Bloodshot
2020	Harley Quinn: Birds of Prey
2020	Underwater

=== 2010s ===
Year	Films / Television Series
2019	The Mandalorian season 1
2019	Lost in Space (Season 2)
2019	Sextuplets
2019	Spider-Man: Far From Home
2019	John Wick: Chapter 3 – Parabellum
2019	Game of Thrones season 8
2019	Pokémon Detective Pikachu
2019	Alien Ore
2018	Overlord
2018	Fantastic Beasts: The Crimes of Grindelwald
2018	The Meg
2018	Sacred Lies
2018	Skyscraper
2018	Kin
2018	Tully
2018	Jurassic World: Fallen Kingdom
2018	Lost in Space (Season 1)
2018	The X-Files season 11
2018	Carnival Row
2017	Thor: Ragnarok
2017	Game of Thrones season 7
2017	Detroit
2017	Power Rangers
2017	Logan
2016	Assassin's Creed
2016	Fantastic Beasts and Where to Find Them
2016	Kingsglaive: Final Fantasy XV
2016	Independence Day: Resurgence
2016	Game of Thrones season 6
2016	Captain America: Civil War
2016	The X-Files season 10
2016	Deadpool
2015	The Revenant
2015	Point Break
2015	The Man in the High Castle (TV series)
2015	The Last Witch Hunter
2015	Straight Outta Compton
2015	Jurassic World
2015	San Andreas
2015	Game of Thrones season 5
2015	Child 44
2015	Chappie
2014	American Sniper
2014	Teenage Mutant Ninja Turtles
2013	Lone Survivor
2013	Elysium
2013	R.I.P.D.
2013	White House Down
2013	Now You See Me
2013	Fast & Furious 6
2012	Zero Dark Thirty
2012	Battleship
2012	Safe House
2011	Immortals
2011	The Thing
2011	Apollo 18
2011	The Twilight Saga: Breaking Dawn – Part 1
2010	The Losers
2010	The Twilight Saga: Eclipse

=== 2000s ===
Year	Films / Television Series
2009	Stargate Universe (Season 1)
2009	Aliens in the Attic
2009	Night at the Museum: Battle of the Smithsonian
2009	District 9
2009	Law Abiding Citizen
2009	Orphan
2009	New in Town
2008	The Day the Earth Stood Still
2008	The Incredible Hulk
2008	Stone of Destiny
2008	Another Cinderella Story
2008	Lost Boys: The Tribe
2008	Tunnel Rats
2008	Vantage Point
2008	Snow Buddies
2007	Mr. Magorium's Wonder Emporium
2007	Fantastic Four: Rise of the Silver Surfer
2007	Blades of Glory
2007	White Noise: The Light
2006	Night at the Museum
2006	Stargate Atlantis season 3
2006	Stargate SG-1 season 10
2006	Three Moons Over Milford Pilot (Season 1)
2006	Slither
2005	Stargate Atlantis season 2
2005	Stargate SG-1 season 9
2004	Taxi
2004	Stargate SG-1 season 8
2004	I, Robot
2004	Scooby-Doo 2: Monsters Unleashed
2003	X2: X-Men United

=== 1990s ===
Year	Films / Television Series
1997	Stargate SG-1 season 1

== Awards ==
Year	Award	Category	Title	Episode or Character	Status
2000	Emmy Award	Outstanding Special Visual Effects for a Series	Stargate SG-1	“Nemesis”	Nomination
2001	Emmy Award	Outstanding Special Visual Effects for a Series	Stargate SG-1	“Small Victories”	Nomination
2001	Emmy Award	Outstanding Special Visual Effects for a Series	Stargate SG-1	“Exodus”	Nomination
2001	Gemini Award	Best Visual Effects	Stargate SG-1	“Small Victories”	Nomination
2001	Gemini Award	Best Visual Effects	Stargate SG-1	“Tangent”	Nomination
2001	Leo Award	Best Visual Effects of Dramatic Series	Stargate SG-1	“Small Victories”	Nomination
2002	Emmy Award	Outstanding Special Visual Effects for a Series	Stargate SG-1	“Revelations”	Nomination
2002	Emmy Award	Outstanding Special Visual Effects for a Series	Stargate SG-1	“Enemies”	Nomination
2002	Gemini Award	Best Visual Effects	Stargate SG-1	“Enemies”	Nomination
2002	Leo Award	Best Visual Effects of Dramatic Series	Stargate SG-1	“Revelations”	Nomination
2003	Gemini Award	Best Visual Effects	Stargate SG-1	“Revelations”	Winner
2003	Leo Award	Best Visual Effects of Dramatic Series	Stargate SG-1	“UnNatural Selection”	Nomination
2003	VES Award	Best Character Animation in a Live Action Televised Program, Music Video or Commercial	Stargate SG-1	“Revelations”	Nomination
2004	Emmy Award	Outstanding Special Visual Effects for a Series	Dead Like Me	N/A	Nomination
2004	Emmy Award	Outstanding Special Visual Effects for a Series	Kingdom Hospital	“They Kingdom Come” Pilot	Nomination
2004	Emmy Award	Outstanding Special Visual Effects for a Series	Stargate SG-1	“Lost City Part 2"	Nomination
2005	Gemini Award	Best Visual Effects	Stargate SG-1	“Redemption” Part 2	Nomination
2005	VES Award	Outstanding Visual Effects in a Broadcast Series	Stargate SG-1	“Lost City Part 2"	Nomination
2005	VES Award	Outstanding Performance by an Animated Character in a Live Action Broadcast Program	Stephen King’s Kingdom Hospital	Antubis	Winner
2010	Academy Award	Best Achievement in Visual Effects	District 9	N/A	Nomination
2010	BAFTA	Best Special Visual Effects	District 9	N/A	Nomination
2010	Emmy Award	Outstanding Special Visual Effects For A Series	Stargate Universe	"Space"	Nomination
2010	Leo Award	Best Visual Effects in a Dramatic Series	Stargate Universe	"Space"	Nomination
2010	VES Award	Outstanding Visual Effects in a Visual Effects Driven a Feature Motion Picture	District 9	N/A	Nomination
2010	VES Award	Outstanding Animated Character in a Live Action Feature Motion Picture	District 9	N/A	Nomination
2010	VES Award	Outstanding Compositing in a Feature Motion Picture	District 9	N/A	Winner
2012	VES Award	Outstanding Animated Character in a Live Action Feature Motion Picture	The Thing	Edvard/Adam	Nomination
2013	VES Award	Outstanding Supporting Visual Effects in a Feature Motion Picture	Zero Dark Thirty	N/A	Nomination
2014	Leo Award	Best Visual Effects Motion Picture	Elysium	N/A	Winner
2014	VES Award	Outstanding Created Environment in a Live Action Feature Motion Picture	Elysium	N/A	Nomination
2014	VES Award	Outstanding Compositing in a Feature Motion Picture	Elysium	N/A	Nomination
2015	HPA Award	Outstanding Visual Effects – Feature Film	Jurassic World	N/A	Nomination
2016	VES Award	Outstanding Animated Performance in a Photoreal Feature	Chappie	N/A	Nomination
2016	VES Award	Outstanding Created Environment in a Photoreal Feature	Jurassic World	N/A	Nomination
2017	VES Award	Outstanding Created Environment in an Episode, Commercial, or RealTime Project	Game of Thrones	S6 “The Winds of Winter”, Citadel	Nomination
2018	Emmy Award	Outstanding Special Visual Effects	Lost in Space	S1 "Danger, Will Robinson"	Nomination
2018	VES Award	Outstanding Animated Character in an Episode or Real-Time Project	Game of Thrones	S7 “The Spoils of War; Drogon Loot Train Attack”	Winner
2019	Emmy Award	Outstanding Special Visual Effects	Game of Thrones	S8 “The Bells"	Winner
2019	HPA Award	Outstanding Visual Effects Episodic (Under 13 Episodes) or Non-theatrical Feature	Game of Thrones	S8 “The Bells"	Winner
2019	Leo Award	Best Visual Effects in a Motion Picture	Tully	N/A	Nomination
2019	VES Award	Outstanding Effects Simulations in an Episode, Commercial, or Real-Time Project	Lost in Space	S2 "Jupiter is Falling"	Nomination
2019	VES Award	Outstanding Visual Effects in a Photoreal Episode	Lost in Space	S1 "Danger, Will Robinson"	Winner
2019	VES Award	Outstanding Animated Character in an Episode or Real-Time Project	Lost in Space	S2 "Humanoid"	Winner
2020	Annie Award	Best Character Animation - Live Action	Game of Thrones	S8 “The Long Night” – Dance of the Dragons	Nomination
2020	Emmy Award	Outstanding Special Visual Effects	Lost in Space	S2 "Ninety-Seven"	Nomination
2021	Annie Award	Best Character Animation - Live Action	The Mandalorian	S2 Mother Spider	Winner
2021	VES Award	Outstanding Compositing in an Episode	The Mandalorian	S2 "Chapter 10: The Passenger"	Nomination
2022	Emmy Award	Outstanding Special Visual Effects In A Single Episode	Snowpiercer	S3 "A Beacon For Us All"	Nomination
2022	Emmy Award	Outstanding Special Visual Effects In A Season Or A Movie	The Book Of Boba Fett	Season 1	Winner
2022	VES Award	Outstanding Animated Character in a Photoreal Feature	Venom: Let There Be Carnage	Carnage	Nomination
2023	VES Award	Outstanding Effects Simulations In A Photoreal Feature	Fantastic Beasts: The Secrets of Dumbledore	N/A	Nomination
2024	Emmy Award	Outstanding Special Visual Effects In A Season Or A Movie	Avatar: The Last Airbender	Season 1	Nomination
2025	Emmy Award	Outstanding Special Visual Effects In A Season Or A Movie	Dune: Prophecy	Season 1	Nomination
