= Britannia Mine Museum =

Museum in British Columbia, Canada

Coordinates: 49.6233°N 123.2044°W

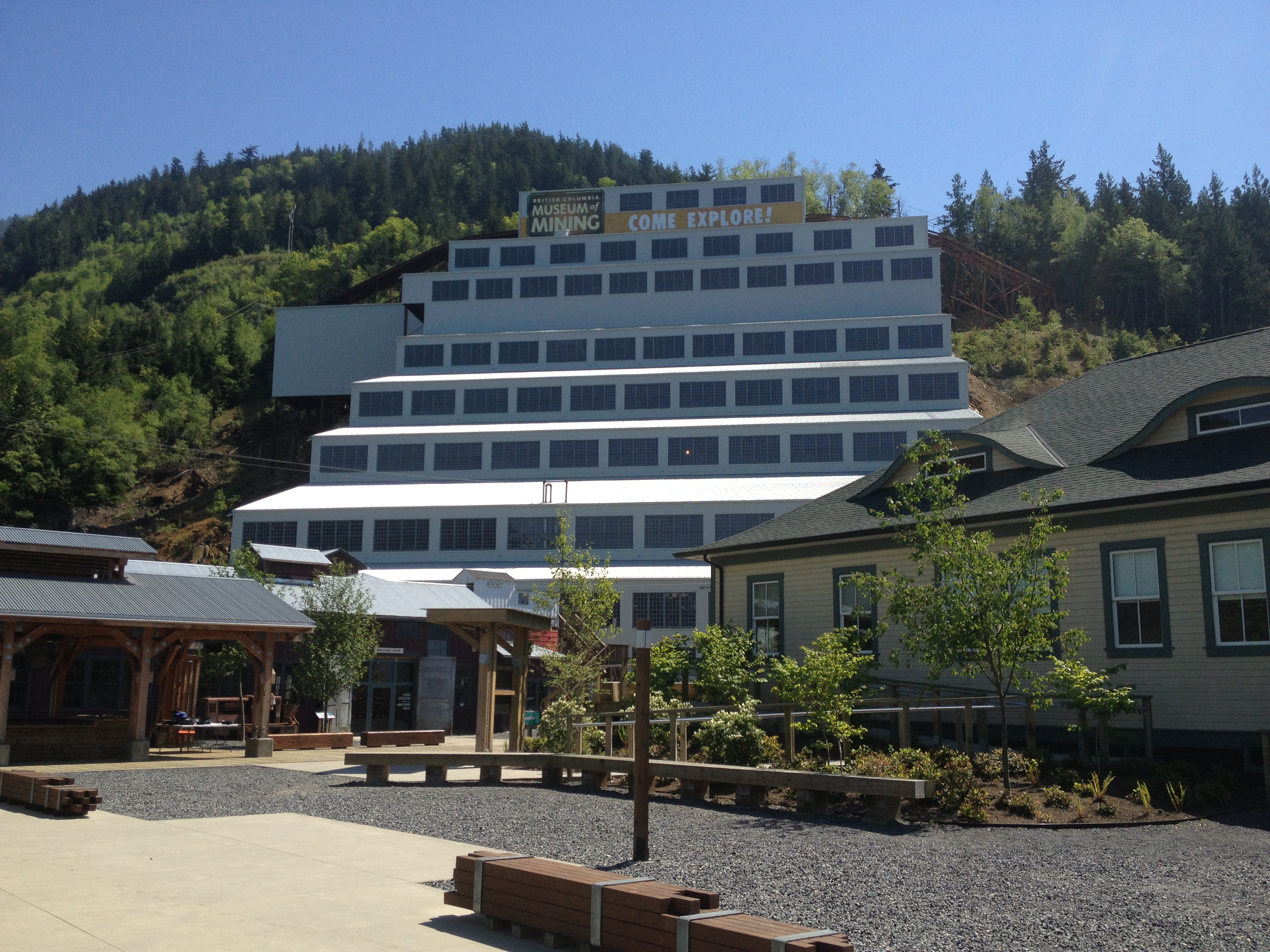
- Former name: British Columbia Museum of Mining
- Location: Britannia Beach, British Columbia, Canada
- Collections: industrial, administrative and domestic buildings artifacts, photographs, documents, and maps
- Director: Cheryl Hendrickson
- Chairperson: Leonie Tomlinson
- Curator: Laura Minta Holland
- Owner: Britannia Beach Historical Society
- Parking: On site (no charge)
- Website: www.britanniaminemuseum.ca

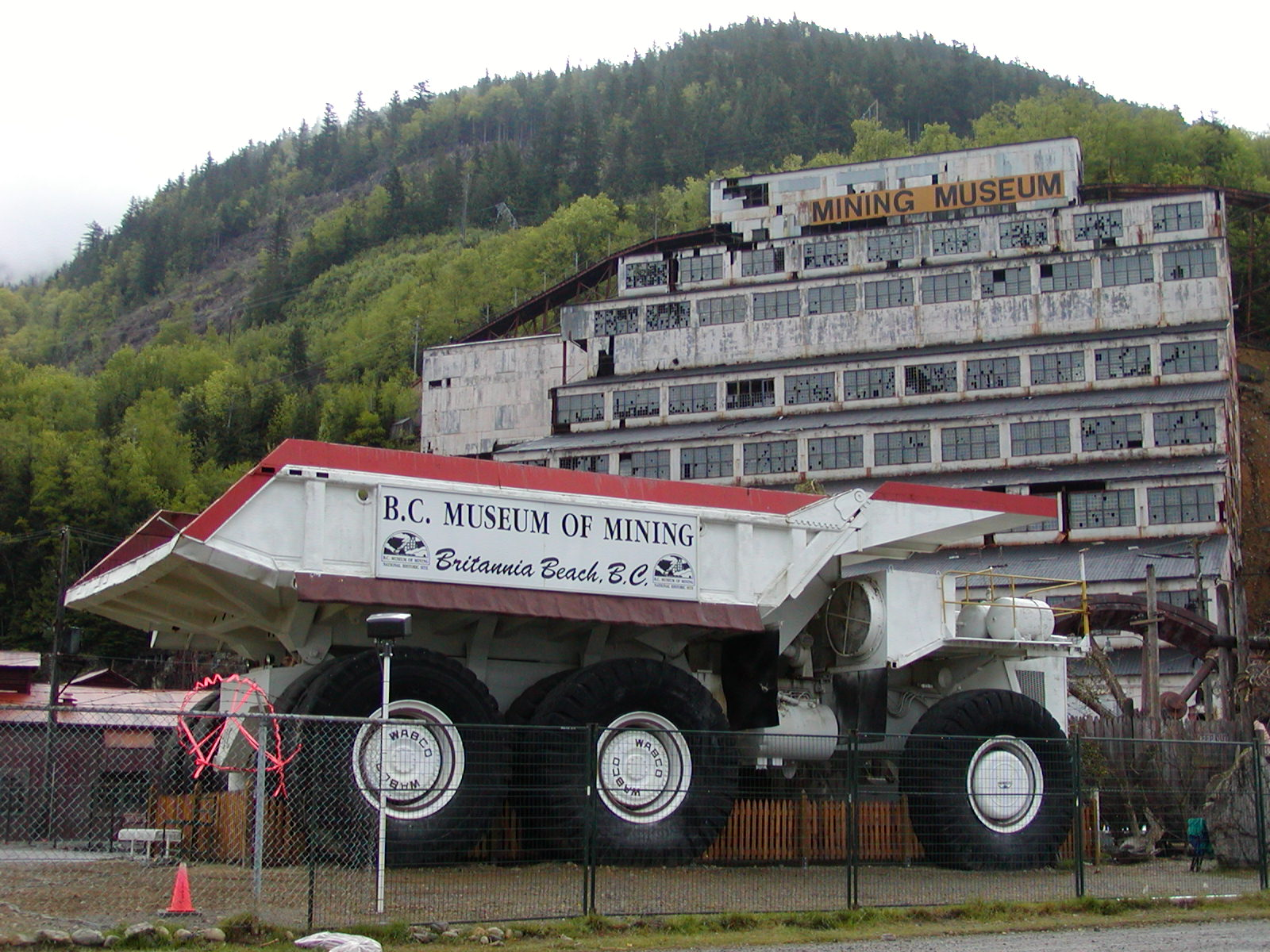
Old WABCO haul truck at museum, 2009

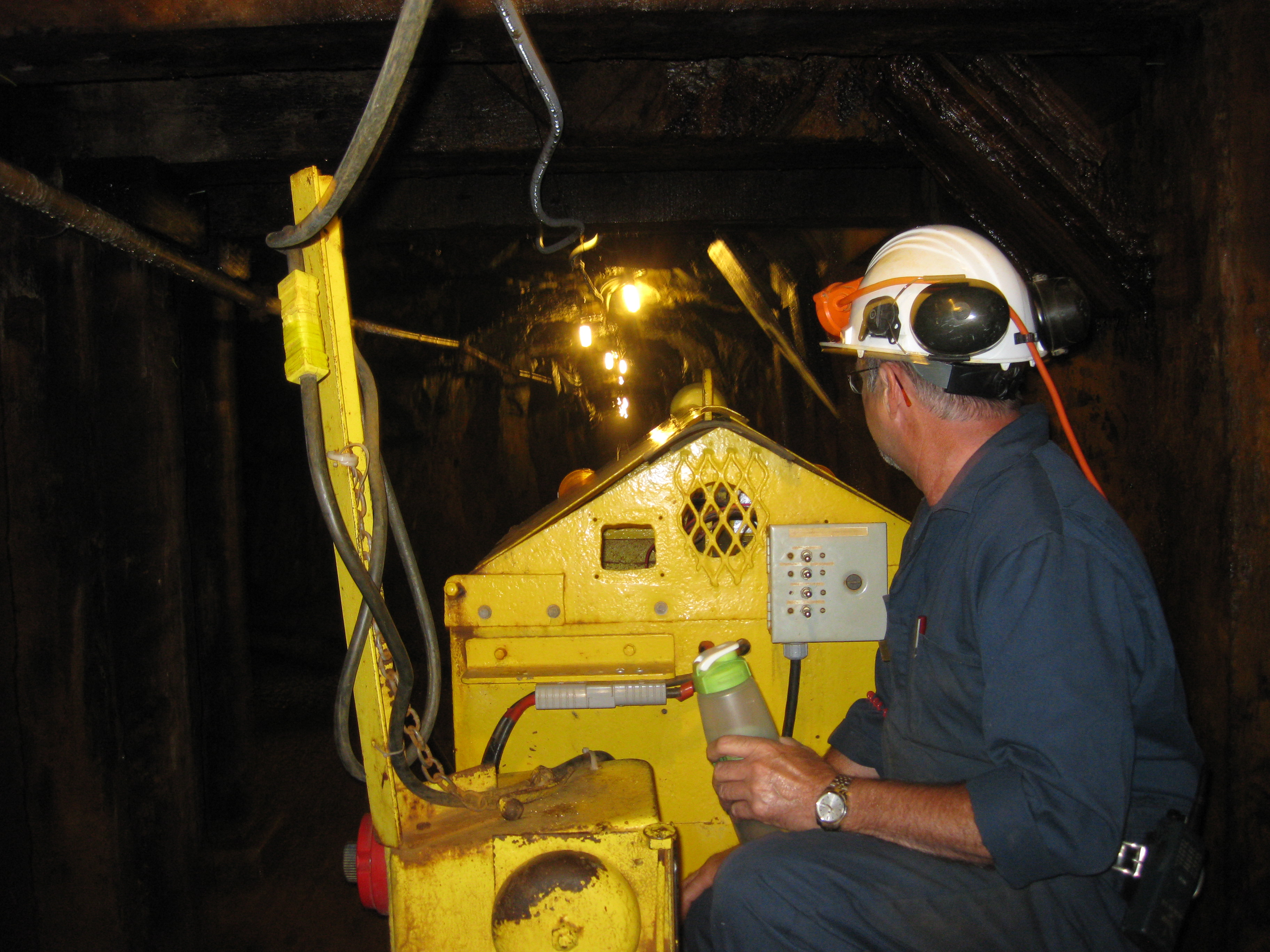
Underground mine tour in the old Britannia mine, 2009

The Britannia Mine Museum, formerly British Columbia Museum of Mining, is a non-profit organization in Britannia Beach, 55 km kilometres north of Vancouver, British Columbia, Canada, on the Sea-to-Sky Highway on Howe Sound. It is governed by the Britannia Mine Museum Society. The museum preserves and presents to the public information and artifacts related to British Columbia's mining industry.

== National historic site ==
The museum is located on the site of Mill No. 3 (also called the Concentrator). Within this 20 storey building, the gravity fed concentrator (for ore processing), was designated as a National Historic Site of Canada in 1987 (with a ceremony in 1988). The Britannia Mine was an important source of copper ore for almost 70 years. During the 1920s and 1930s, it constituted as one of the largest mining operations in Canada and was the largest copper mining operation in the British Empire. The gravity-fed concentrator was highly innovative, as, for example, in the use of bulk froth flotation.

== History ==
The Britannia Beach Historical Society was established in 1971 as part of BC's centennial plans. Its goal was to preserve the history of mining activities in British Columbia. The museum opened in 1975 as the BC Museum of Mining. Mill 3 underwent a $5 million exterior rehabilitation between 2005 and 2007 to replace the siding, roof, and windows.

After an additional $14.7 million redevelopment project, the museum was renamed the Britannia Mine Museum in October 2010. There are displays concerning the importance of minerals in daily life, and on the history of the Britannia Mine, including its environmental remediation. The funding for this, the Britannia Project, came from government, industry donors and individuals.

== Buildings and site ==
The museum oversees 23 historic industrial, administrative and domestic buildings, over 7000 artifacts, 9500 archive photos and 3000 archival documents and maps. Visitors are given a train ride through a historic haulage tunnel, driven in 1914 to transport ore from the original mill buildings to the shore. Historic mining and lighting equipment is demonstrated to the visitor. The historic nature of the site has resulted in many feature films and television productions being filmed there, most notably Scooby-Doo 2: Monsters Unleashed, the episode "Paper Clip" of The X-Files, the episode "Metamorphosis" of Smallville, Okja, Alien Ore, The Man in the High Castle, and MacGyver.
