= Sky Pilot Mountain (British Columbia) =

Mountain in British Columbia, Canada

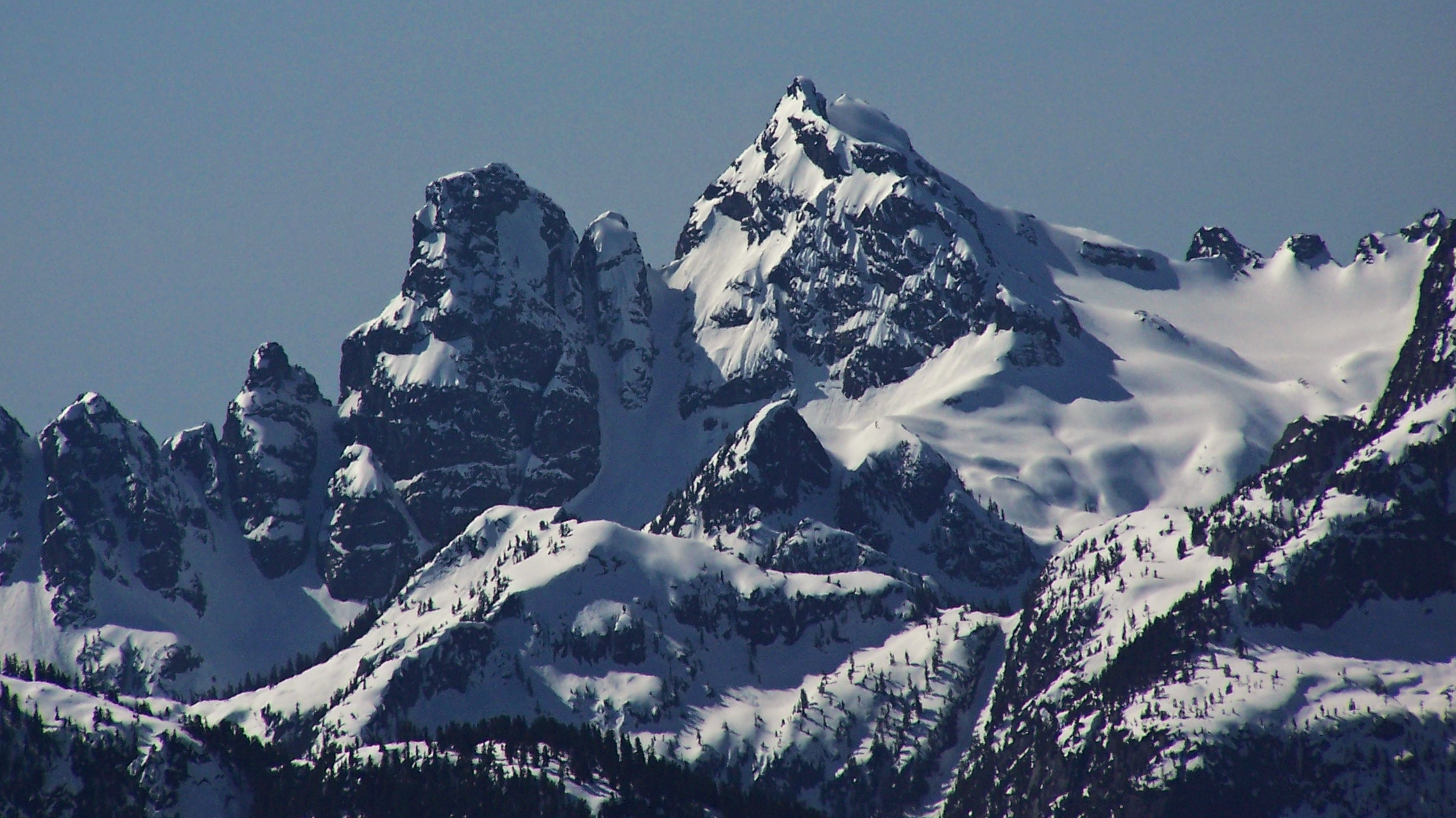

Highest point
- Elevation: 2,031 m (6,663 ft)
- Prominence: 1,236 m (4,055 ft)
- Parent peak: Mamquam Mountain (2588 m)
- Listing: Mountains of British Columbia
- Coordinates: 49°38′05″N 123°05′11″W

Geography
- Location within Squamish-Lillooet Regional District Location within British Columbia
- Interactive map of Sky Pilot Mountain
- Countries: British Columbia, Canada
- Region: Squamish-Lillooet Regional District
- District: New Westminster Land District
- Parent range: Britannia Range
- Topo map: NTS 92G11 Squamish

Climbing
- First ascent: 1910 Basil Darling, H. Dowler, A. Morkill, J. Haggard, and Grubbe
- Easiest route: South ridge

Sky Pilot Mountain is the highest mountain in the Britannia Range of the Coast Mountains of British Columbia, Canada. It is sometimes considered the highest peak in the North Shore Mountains of the Vancouver area. It forms the basis of the Sky Pilot group, a popular mountaineering area which includes several nearby rocky peaks including Co-Pilot (1,881m), Ledge Mountain (1,964m), Mount Sheer (1,752m), and Ben Lomond (1,654 m).

In 2014, two people died on Stadium Glacier below Sky Pilot in separate incidents. Another person died in 2017 while climbing the mountain. The area has seen an increase in the number of visitors since the opening of the Sea to Sky Gondola in 2014.

The mountain, and Sky Pilot Rock near Desolation Sound are named for the United Church's mission boat Sky Pilot.

== Climate ==
Based on the Köppen climate classification, Sky Pilot is located in the marine west coast climate zone of western North America. Most weather fronts originate in the Pacific Ocean, and travel east toward the Coast Mountains where they are forced upward by the range (Orographic lift), causing them to drop their moisture in the form of rain or snowfall. As a result, the Coast Mountains experience high precipitation, especially during the winter months in the form of snowfall. The months July through September offer the most favorable weather for climbing Sky Pilot.

== Gallery ==
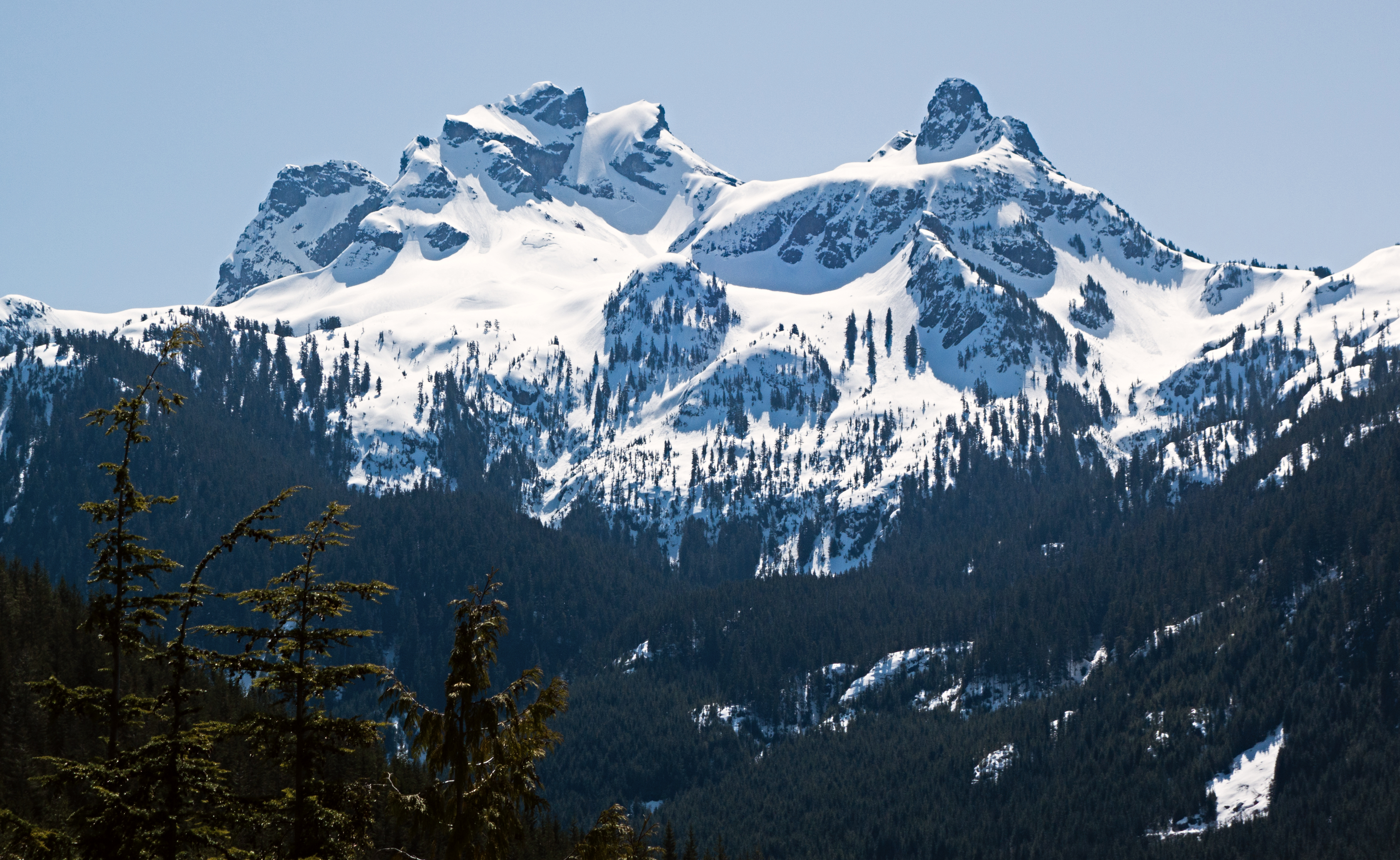
Sky Pilot Mountain and The Copilot (right)

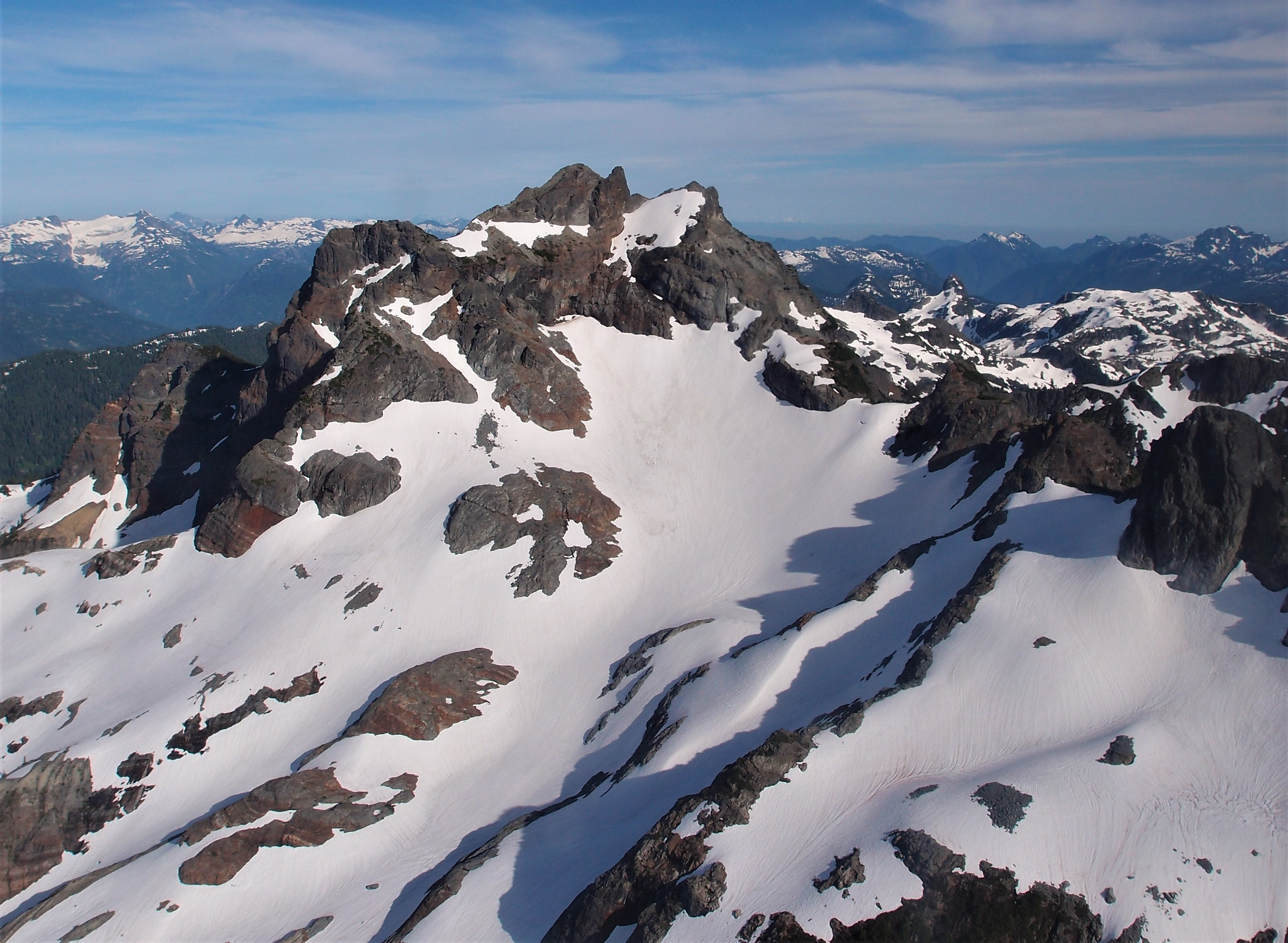
Aerial view showing northwest aspect

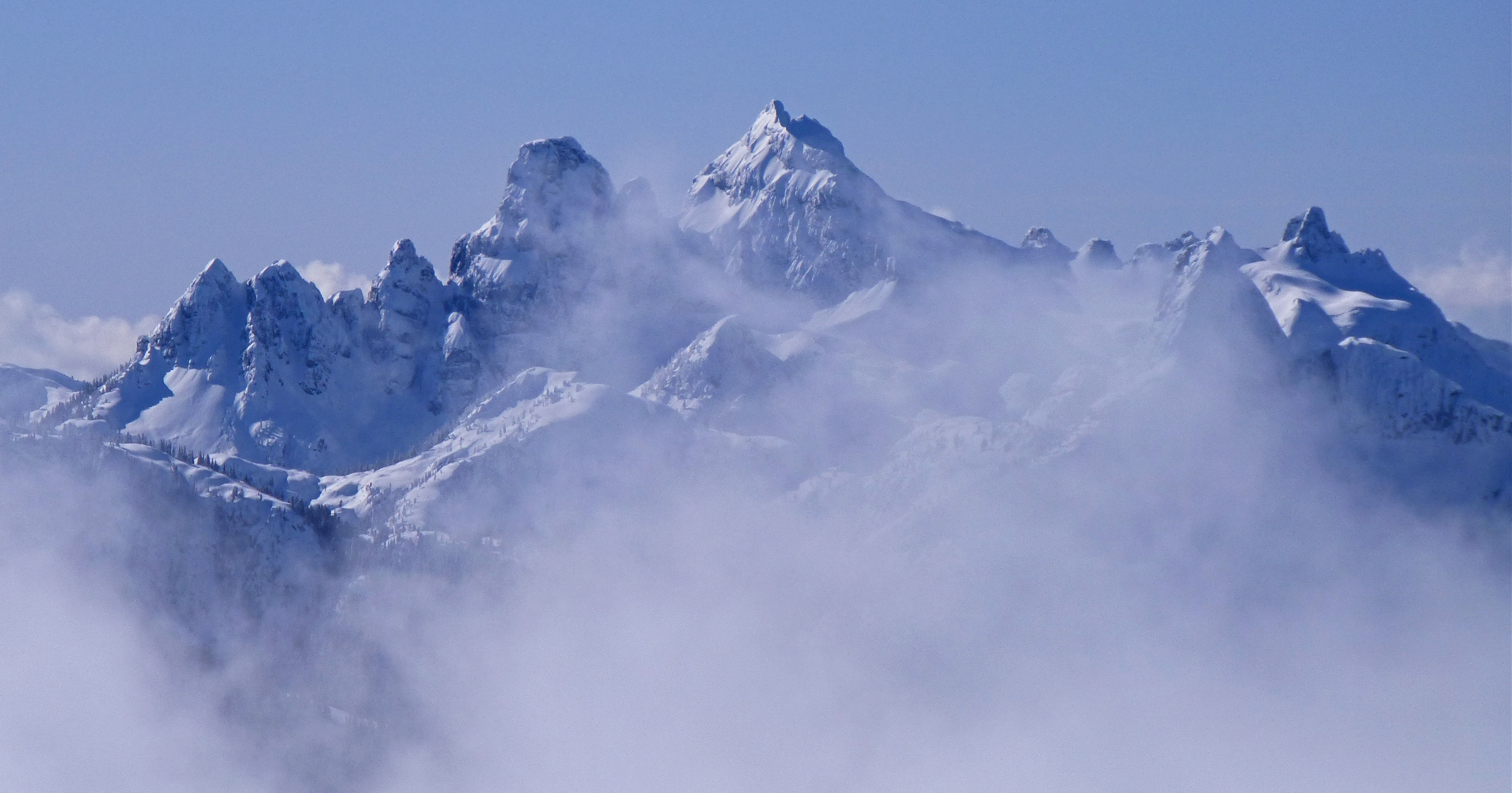
North aspect

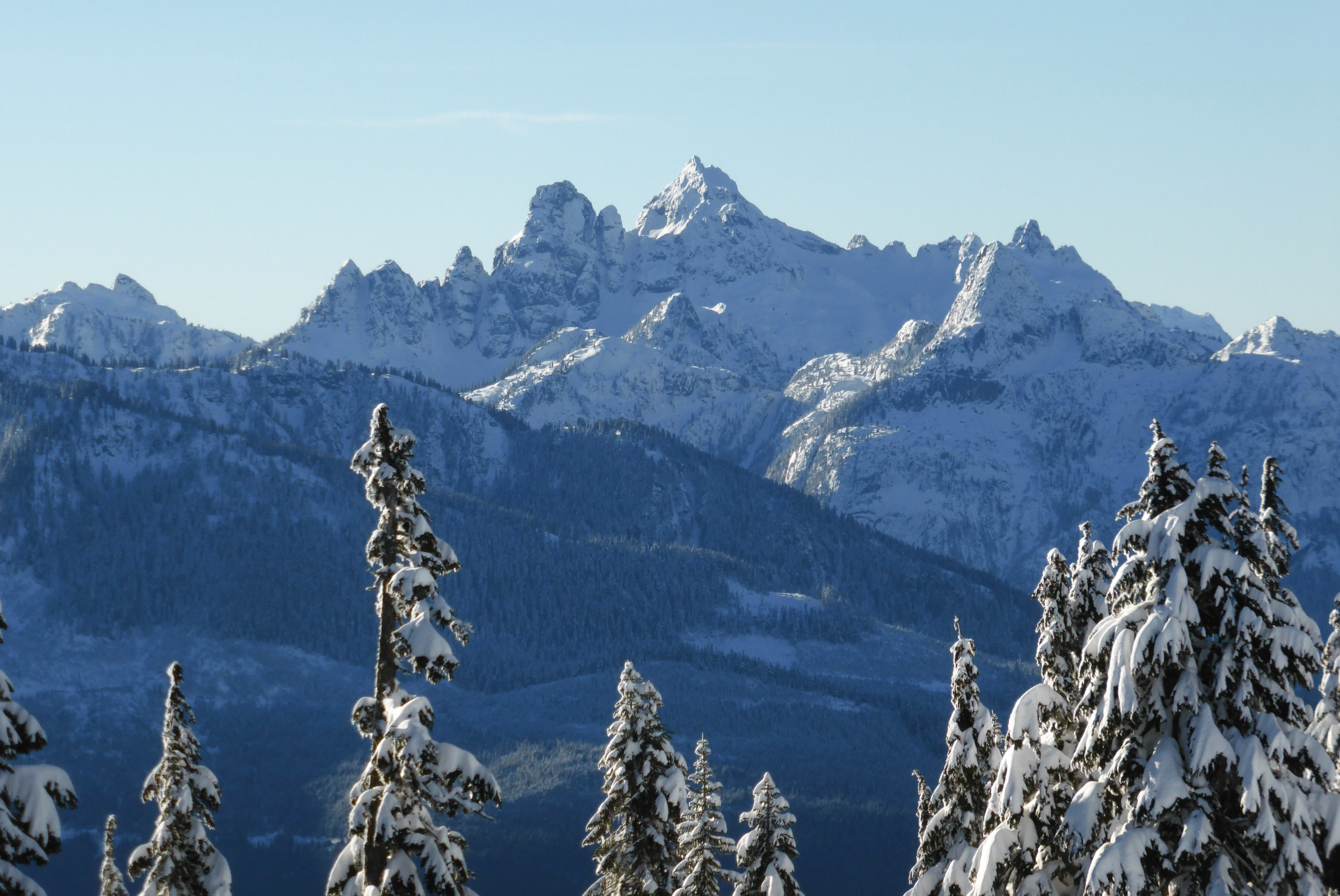
North aspect
