= Alien Ore =

2019 American short film

- Directed by: The Spear Sisters (Kailey & Sam Spear)
- Written by: The Spear Sisters (Kailey & Sam Spear)
- Based on: Alien by: Dan O'Bannon; Ronald Shusett
- Produced by: Victoria Burkheart; Synnöve Godeseth
- Starring: Mikela Jay
- Cinematography: Graham & Nelson Talbot
- Edited by: Daniel Jeffery
- Production companies: Tongal Studios; 20th Century Fox
- Distributed by: IGN; 20th Century Fox
- Release dates: April 19, 2019 (IGN); May 3, 2019 (Fox)
- Running time: 11 minutes
- Country: United States

Alien Ore is a short film based on the science fiction action media franchise Alien. Released via IGN on April 19, 2019, coinciding with the 40th anniversary of the franchise, the film was written and directed by the Spear Sisters, through Tongal Studios and 20th Century Fox. Starring Mikela Jay as Lorraine Hawkes, the film follows a group of Weyland-Yutani miners at the colony of Bowen's Landing who encounter a Xenomorph within the mine where they work.

The nineteenth short film in the Alien franchise, it received a generally positive critical reception. The 2022 novel Alien: Inferno's Fall follows on from the events of the film, with the father of secondary protagonist Toru McLintock-Riley having lost his life at Bowen's Landing.

== Plot ==
In 2122, following the events of Alien, miner Lorraine Hawkes longs to make a better life for her daughter and grandchildren. But when her shift uncovers the death of a fellow miner at the hands of a xenomorph, Lorraine is forced to choose between escape or defying the orders of Weyland-Yutani management and facing her fears to fight for the safety of her family.

After blinding her android supervisor Hanks, Lorraine ventures into the mine shaft alone, armed with a rock drill, to face off against the xenomorph, joined by her fellow miners wielding their mining tools, as the xenomorph lunges forward. (Note: The 2022 novel Alien: Inferno's Fall reveals the miners to have all died fighting the xenomorph.)

== Cast ==
- Mikela Jay as Lorraine Hawkes
- Tara Pratt as Hanks
- Dalj Brar as Martin Rai
- Steven Stiller as Kolton Brown
- Ambrose Gardener as Clark Witchell
- Theresa Wong as Ryo Kuan
- Alexandra Quispe as Winni Mamani
- Julie Boersema as Anna Hawkes
- Bola Omodara as Bill Monroe (Foreman)
- Calder Stewart as Alan Reid
- Sidney as Dan the Dog
- Ali Ajmeri as Rex Parish
- Bec Piplica as Miranda Jacobson
- Katalina Bernards as Tracy Rajamani
- Eric Yue as Kenneth Rapley
- Mattie Shisko as Tamara
- Tim Howe as Glen
- Patrick Henderson as Vincent
- Sigourney Vienna Wallace as Colleen
- Allison Layne as Carla
- Stephanie Cho as Molly
- Brendan Taylor as Louis

Christian Lagasse portrays the titular Xenomorph.

== Production ==
In July 2018, it was reported that 20th Century Fox had joined forces with Tongal Studios to produce a series of Alien short films to coincide with the 40th anniversary of the franchise. By March 2019, the details of the short films were released, Tongal co-founder and CEO James DeJulio describing the joint-production as "reflective of Tongal's mission to bring creative opportunities to the next generation of talent." The fourth short released and the nineteenth overall in the franchise, Alien Ore was written and directed by the Spear Sisters (Kailey & Sam Spear), one of three different stories they pitched, using a xenomorph model built by Image Engine, and storyboarded by Kaitlyn Hunter, pre-production having lasted three months from July 25 to October 22, 2018, filming in the Britannia Mine Museum copper mine outside of Vancouver, British Columbia from October 22 to November 2, 2018.

== Release ==
Alien Ore was released on the IGN website on April 19, 2019, after which it was uploaded to the Alien Universe website, and all Alien social media pages on May 5, 2019, the short film then premiering alongside five others at the Emerald City Comic Con in Seattle, and as a Movies Anywhere-exclusive bonus feature accompanying the digital release of Alien.

== Reception ==
Alien Ore received a positive critical reception. Brian Silliman of Syfy complimented the film for "do[ing] a good job of not showing too much [like] the first Alien film [while] celebrat[ing] it in style", with John Squires of Bloody Disgusting describing it as "feeling quite true to everything the Alien franchise has become known for. Think Aliens meets… My Bloody Valentine!".
