= Mount Sheer =

Mountain in British Columbia, Canada

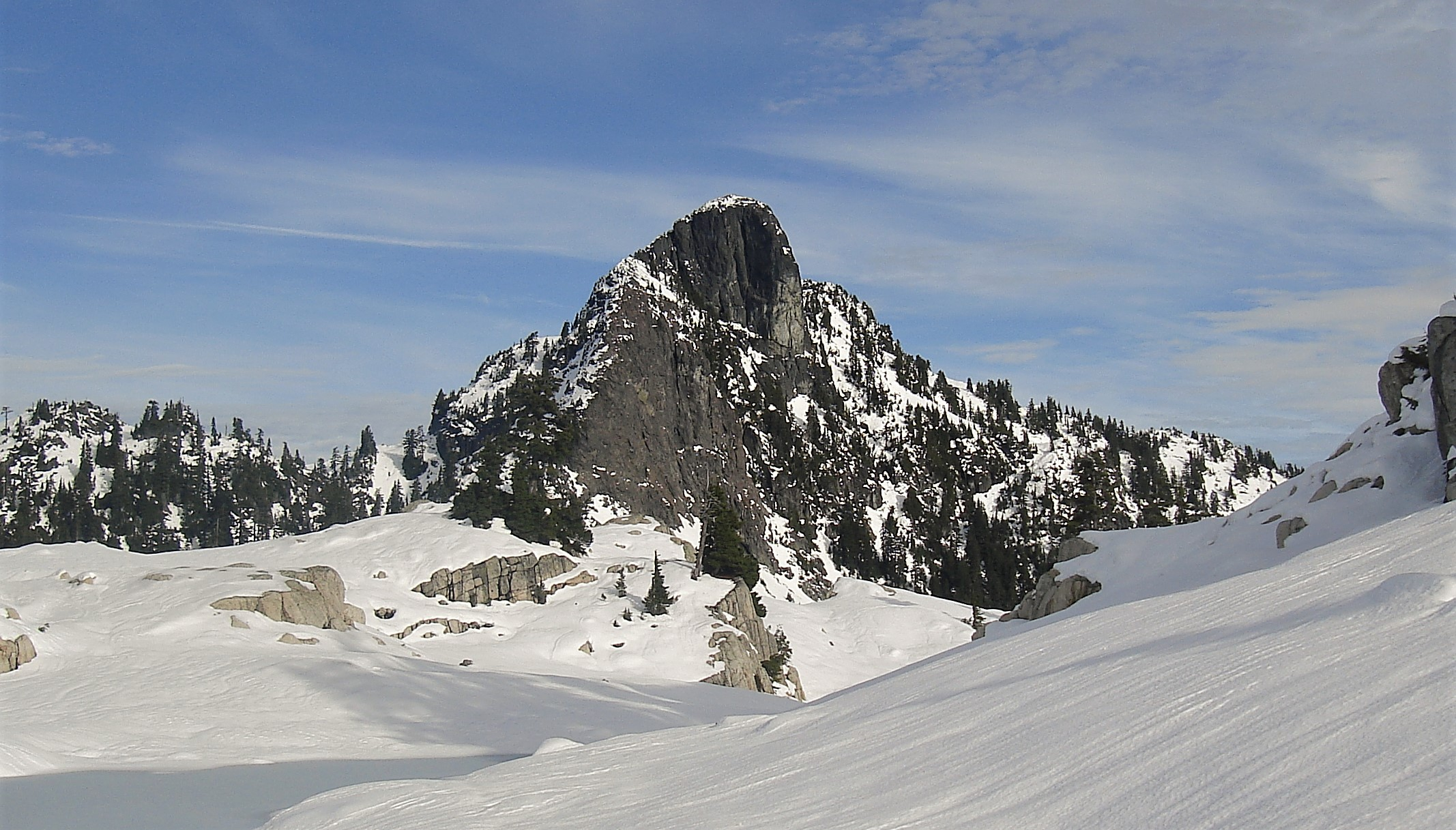
- Southwest aspect

Highest point
- Elevation: 1,752 m (5,748 ft)
- Prominence: 192 m (630 ft)
- Parent peak: Sky Pilot Mountain (2,031 m)
- Isolation: 2.02 km (1.26 mi)
- Listing: Mountains of British Columbia
- Coordinates: 49°37′05″N 123°04′23″W

Geography
- Location within British Columbia Location within Canada
- Interactive map of Mount Sheer
- Country: Canada
- Province: British Columbia
- District: New Westminster Land District
- Parent range: North Shore Mountains; Coast Mountains
- Topo map: NTS 92G11 Squamish

Mount Sheer is a mountain summit located in British Columbia, Canada.

== Description ==
Mount Sheer is a 1,752-metre-elevation (5,748-foot) peak situated 9 kilometres (5.6 miles) east of Britannia Beach and 2.15 kilometres (1.34 miles) south of line parent Sky Pilot Mountain. It is part of the North Shore Mountains which are a subrange of the Coast Mountains. Precipitation runoff from the peak drains east into tributaries of the Stawamus River, and west to Howe Sound via Britannia Creek. Topographic relief is significant as the summit rises over 750 metres (2,460 feet) above the river in 2 kilometres (1.2 miles). The mountain's toponym was officially adopted June 4, 1953, by the Geographical Names Board of Canada.

== Climate ==
Based on the Köppen climate classification, Mount Sheer is located in the marine west coast climate zone of western North America. Most weather fronts originate in the Pacific Ocean, and travel east toward the Coast Mountains where they are forced upward by the range (Orographic lift), causing them to drop their moisture in the form of rain or snowfall. As a result, the Coast Mountains experience high precipitation, especially during the winter months in the form of snowfall. Temperatures in winter can drop below −20 °C with wind chill factors below −30 °C.

== Gallery ==
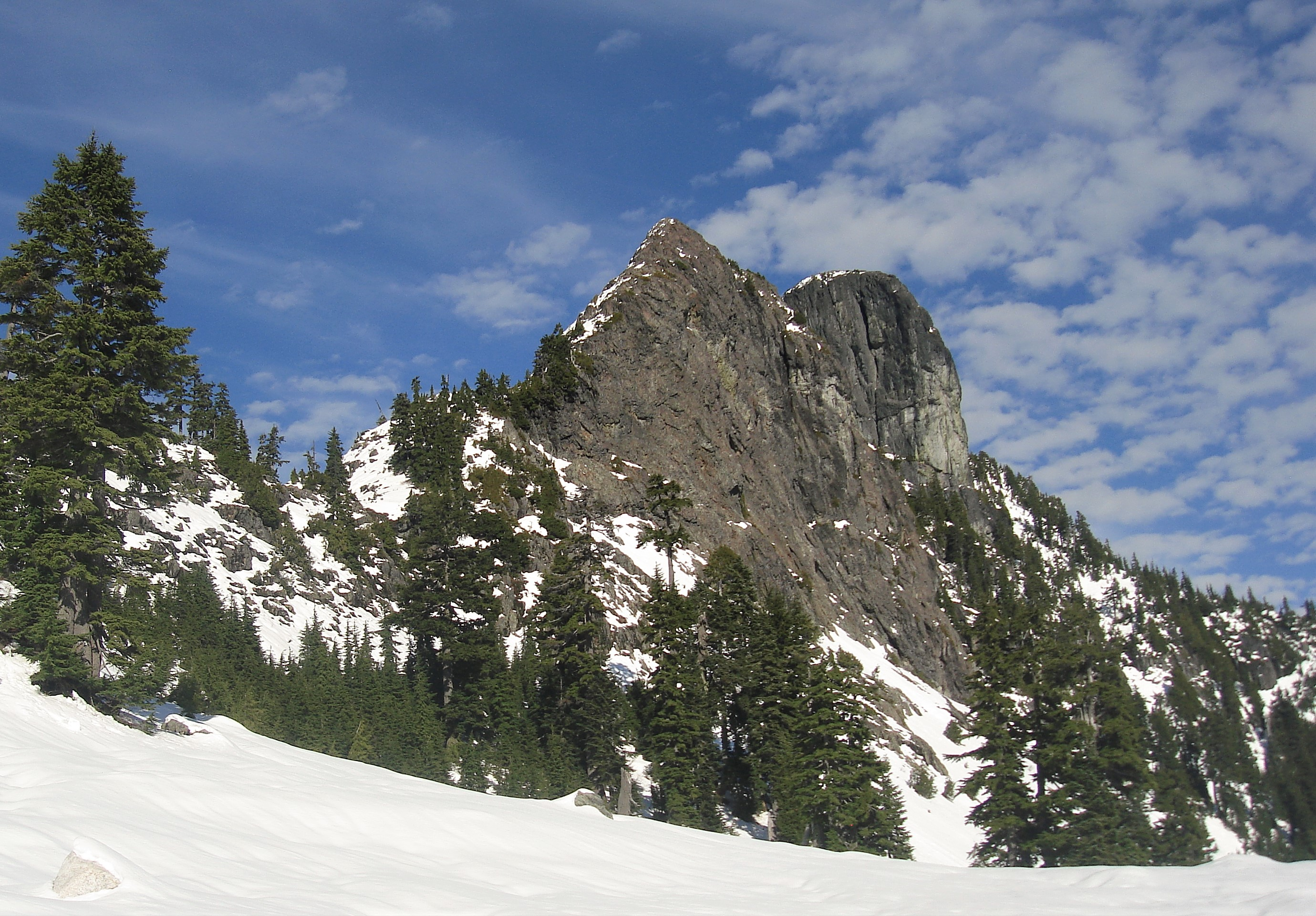
Mount Sheer

== See also ==
- Geography of British Columbia
