= Britannia Beach =

Village in British Columbia, Canada

Coordinates: 49°37′30″N 123°12′15″W

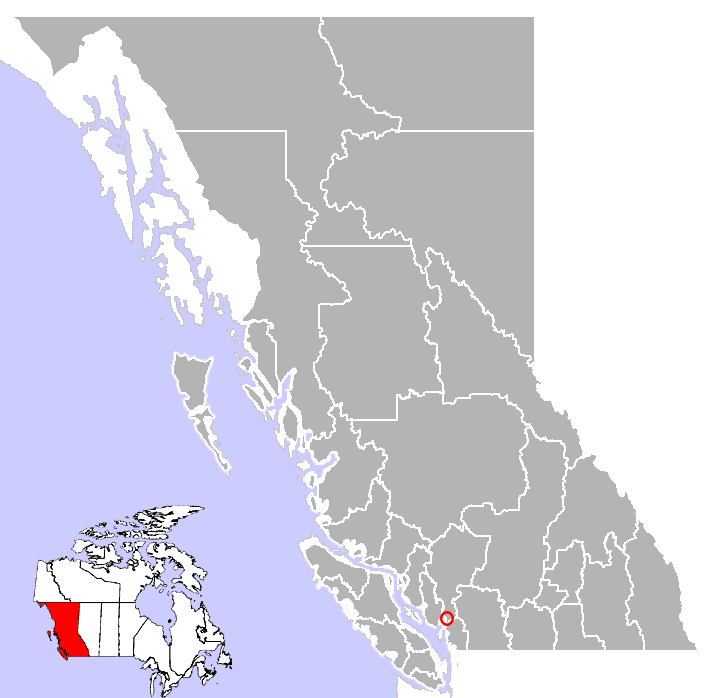
Location of Britannia Beach, British Columbia

Britannia Beach is a small unincorporated community in the Squamish-Lillooet Regional District located approximately 55 kilometres north of Vancouver, British Columbia on the Sea-to-Sky Highway on Howe Sound. As of 2021 it had a population of about 400. It includes the nearby Britannia Creek, a small to mid-sized stream that flows into Howe Sound that was historically one of North America's most polluted waterways.

The community first developed between 1900 and 1904 as the residential area for the staff of the Britannia Mining and Smelting Company. The residential areas and the mining operation were physically interrelated, resulting in coincidental mining and community disasters through its history.

Today, the town is host to the Britannia Mine Museum, formerly known as the British Columbia Museum of Mining, on the grounds of the old Britannia Mines. The mine's old Concentrator facilities, used to separate copper ore from its containing rock, are a National Historic Site of Canada.

== History ==
The first settler/European person to sail the South Western inlet of what is now British Columbia was George Vancouver in 1792. When surveying the waters, George Vancouver gave name to the area, Howe Sound, in honour of Admiral Richard Howe. Britannia Beach took its name from the nearby Britannia Range of mountains, which form the east wall of the mountainous shore of Howe Sound south of Britannia Beach. About 1859 Royal Navy hydrographer Captain Richards of HMS Plumper named the range of mountains for HMS Britannia, the third of a series of vessels to bear that name. The Britannia was never in these waters.

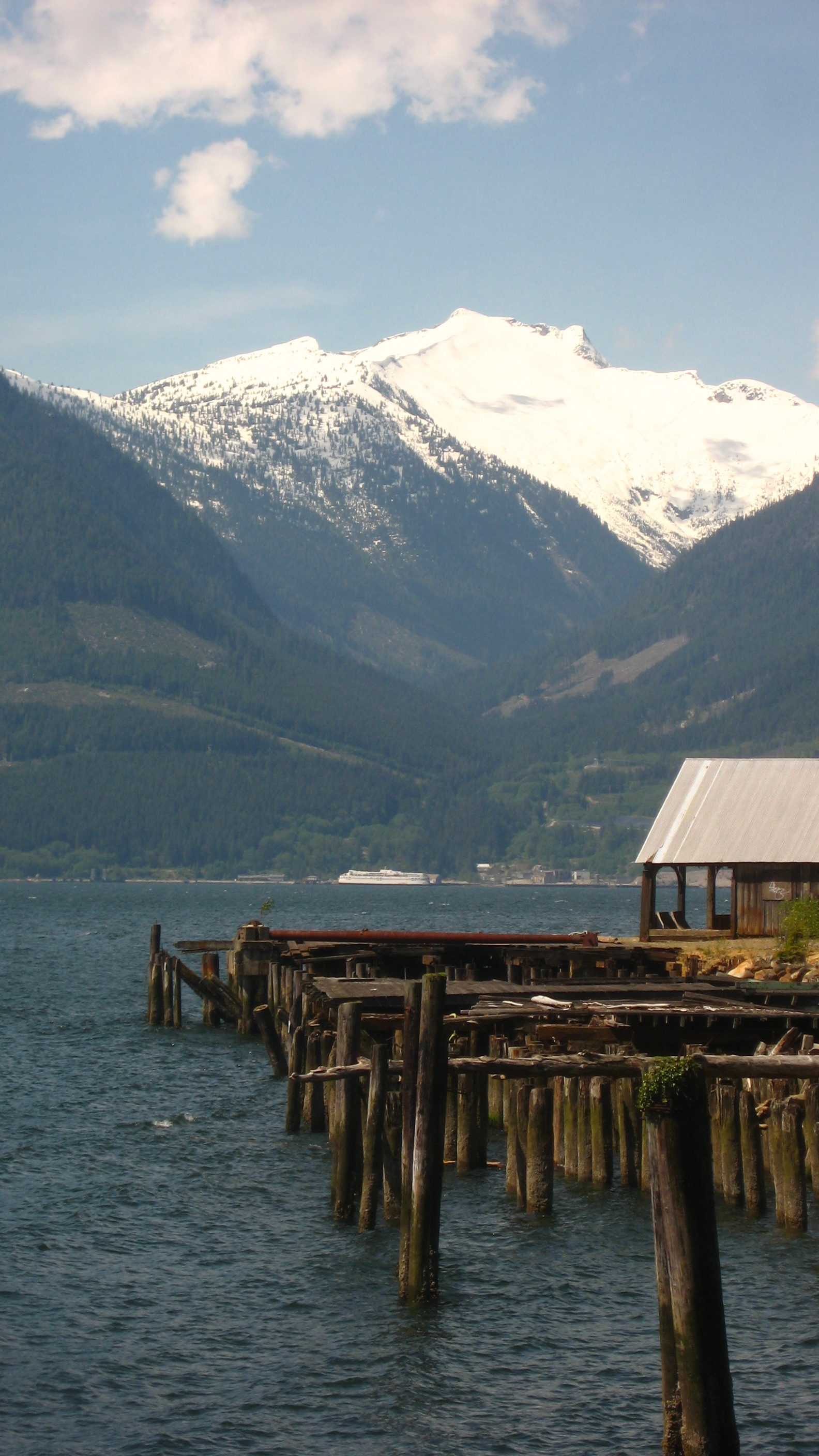
Britannia Beach by Howe Sound

=== Copper mine (1888-1974) ===
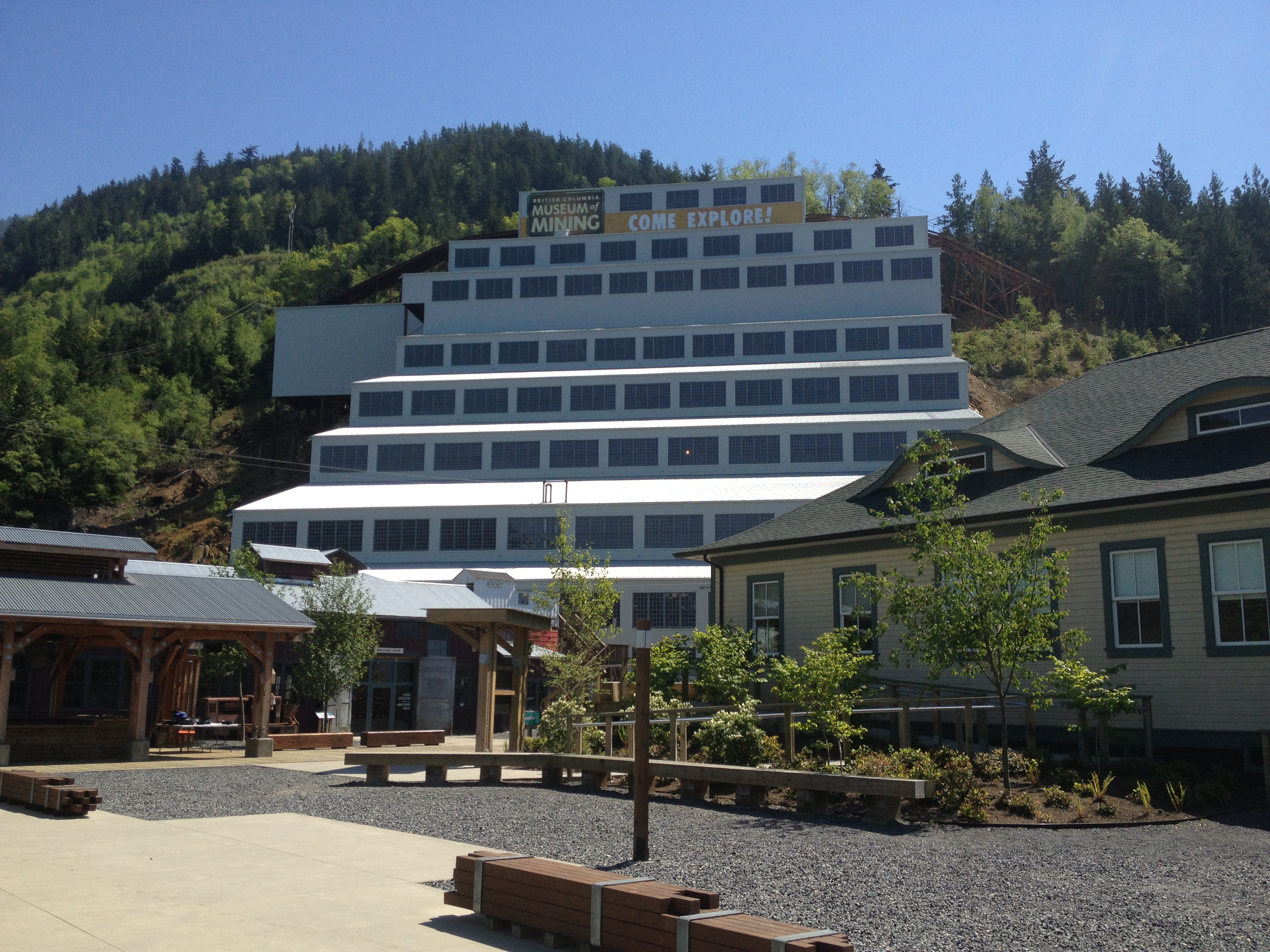
Britannia Mine Museum, at Britannia Beach, BC

A copper discovery on Britannia Mountain by Dr. A. A. Forbes in 1888 led to the development of the Britannia Mine. 10 years after Dr. A. A. Forbes discovered copper, Oliver Furry made 5 claims in the surrounding area. In 1899, a mining engineer named George Robinson was able to convince financial backers that the property had great potential. For several years, companies were formed, merged and dissolved in efforts to raise capital. Large scale mining began in 1903 with the completion of a concentrator that had a 200 ton capacity which was funded by Grant B. Schley. The Britannia Mining and Smelting Company, a branch of the Howe Sound Company, finally commenced mining in the early 1900s, and owned the site for the next sixty years. The first ore was shipped to the Crofton Smelter on Vancouver Island in 1904, and the mine achieved full production in 1905.

A town had grown up around the mine and a post office opened on January 1, 1907 where it was named after the nearby mine.

In 1912 John Wedderburn Dunbar Moodie was authorized to upgrade the operation and increase production from the mine. Improvements in the mineral separation processes stimulated plans for a new mill (No. 2), which was completed in 1916 and was capable of producing 2000 tons of ore per day. The onset of World War I increased the demand for copper and the price rose sharply.

=== Britannia Beach landslide disaster ===
On March 21, 1915 an avalanche destroyed the Jane Camp. Sixty men, women and children were killed and it was a terrible blow to the tiny community. Construction began immediately on a new, safer town at the 2,200-foot (670 m) level above the Britannia Beach site. This portion of the community became known as the "Town site" or "Mount Sheer".

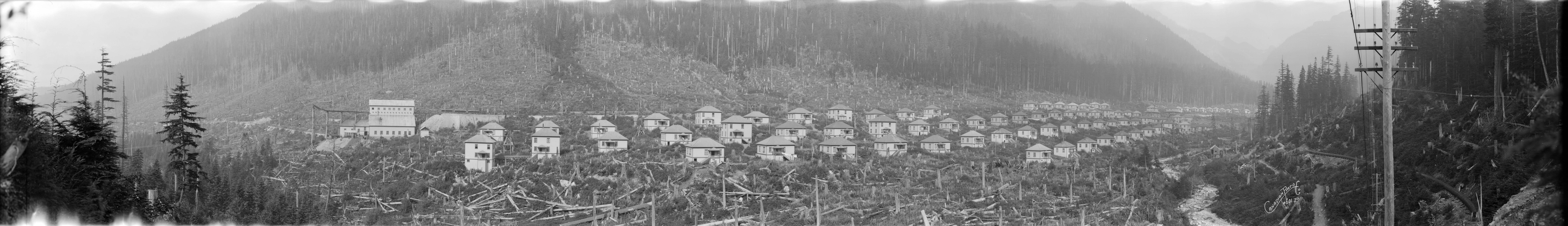
Mount Sheer or Upper town mining camp sits in a hanging valley of Mount Sheer above Britannia Beach, 9 September 1919. It was built to replace the destroyed Jane Camp

In March 1921 during a brief period when the mine was shut down, mill No. 2 burnt to the ground.

On October 28, 1921 after a full day of torrential rain, a massive flood destroyed much of that portion of the community and mine operations that existed on the lower beach area. 50 of 110 homes were destroyed and thirty-seven men, women and children lost their lives. The flood was caused because the mining company had dammed up a portion of the Creek during the construction of a railway, and when this dam gave way the town below was flooded. Carleton Perkins Browning directed the reconstruction of this portion of the community and the new No. 3 mill, which stands today.

Being an isolated, close knit community which could only be accessed by boat, life in both of Britannia's towns was never dull. The Britannia Mining and Smelting Company tried to minimize turnover by providing amenities and implementing family-friendly policies. Facilities included libraries, club rooms, billiard rooms, swimming pools, tennis courts and even bowling. A thriving social calendar saw sporting events, theatrical productions, dances, movies and parties held throughout the year.

The mine boomed in the late 1920s and early 1930s, becoming the largest producer of copper in the British Commonwealth by 1929, under the management of the mine manager C.P. Browning.

In the 1940s there were talks to build an artist village in Britannia's hills, but that plan did not proceed.

Miners unionized in 1946 and suffered through their first strike. Low copper prices saw the Britannia Mine Company reduced to seven employees, and in 1959 it went into liquidation.

In 1963 the Anaconda Mining Company bought the property and production continued for the next eleven years. 300 employees managed to produce 60,000 tons of concentrate each year. Ferries services stopped around May 1965 after the highway and railway connections had been constructed. The connections made it easier to transport the copper, but high operating costs and taxes eventually forced the mine to close on November 1, 1974. The company did not attempt to clean up the mine and chemical wastes that it produced, since environmental protection laws had not yet been enacted and enforcement of the Fisheries Act was never applied. A newly elected labour government presented higher anticipated union costs and the ore vein had already been 'highgraded' (rich ores stolen). With the closure of the mine, the economy of the town diminished rapidly, and the railway station shut down soon after. Residents responded to the closure of the mine with a museum plan, preserving the copper concentrator and other historic buildings as part of the British Columbia Mining Museum [now Britannia Mine Museum].

== Population (1888-1974) ==
Though the early settlers of Britannia Beach were primarily single white men, the company town was considered quite diverse. According to the Britannia Mine Museum:

"Workers at the Britannia Mine came from far and wide. It was recorded that people from 50 nationalities came to work here. Most of those came from Canada and Europe - for example in 1948, 48% of workers were Canadian, 47% were European, 2% were classed as 'Oriental', and 1% was American."

Though there was a minor Asian population in Britannia Beach, they played a prominent role in the town. Since Bill No. 47 was passed in 1900 by the Canadian Government, Japanese and Chinese workers were not permitted to work underground, but were able to take jobs above the ground.

== Britannia Creek pollution ==
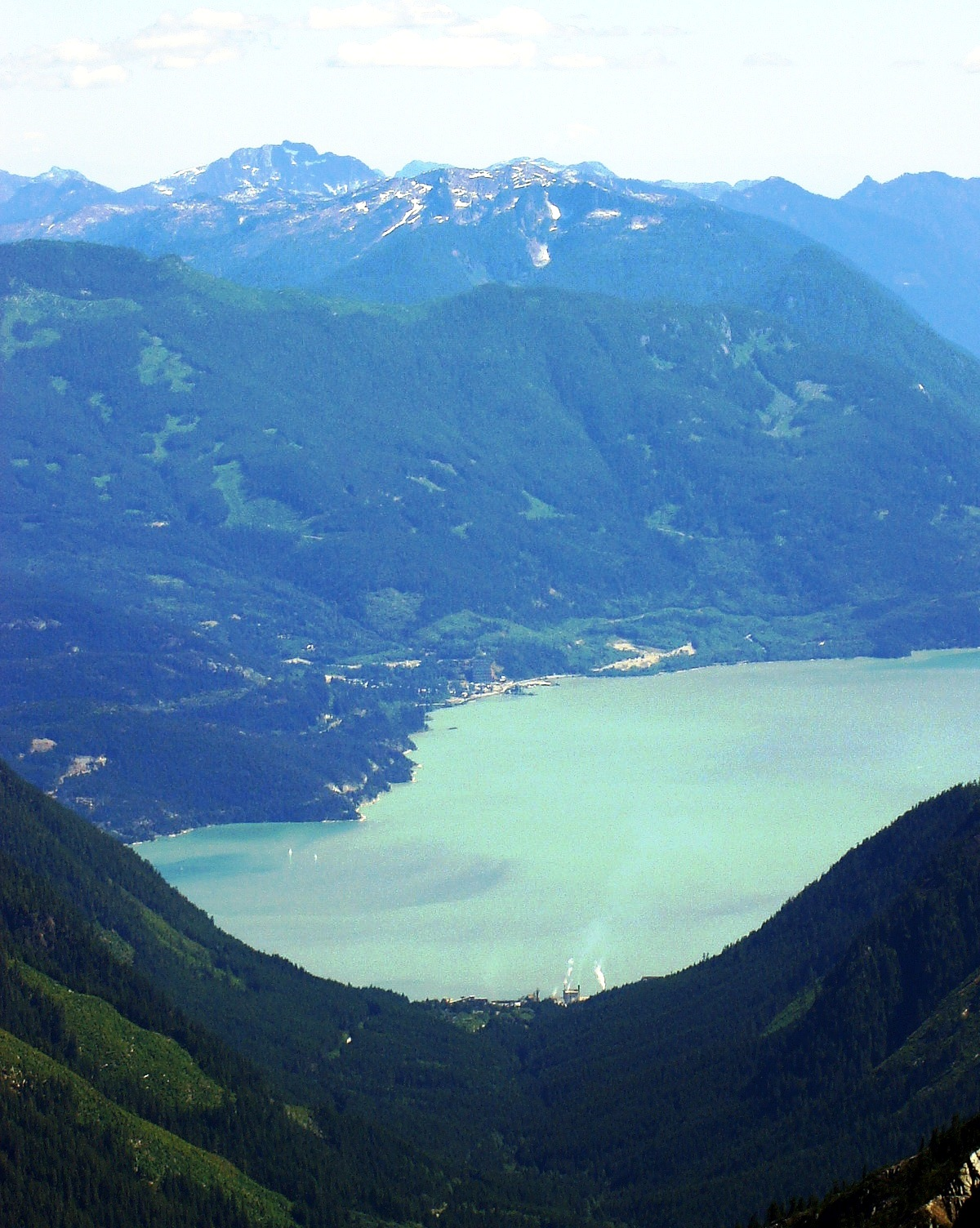
Britannia Beach as seen from above Woodfibre. The Mount Sheer and Jane Basin camps sat in the high valley in the upper left of the photo. Ore was brought down by surface tramways and tunnels.

Prior to the reclamation work undertaken by the University of British Columbia and the Provincial Government, the clear and transparent water in Britannia Creek suggested a pristine environment, however the clear water was actually an indication that no living creatures could survive in it. The water could not be consumed by humans either.

Although mining at Britannia Creek stopped in 1974, runoff and rainwater that flow through the mine's abandoned tunnels combine with oxygen and the high sulfide content of the waste rock to create a condition called acid rock drainage (ARD). As a result of ARD, Britannia Creek became severely polluted. And, for close to a century prior to December, 2001, polluted run-off was being deposited directly into Howe Sound via Jane Creek and Britannia Creek; as much as 450 kilograms (close to one thousand pounds) of copper was entering Howe Sound daily.

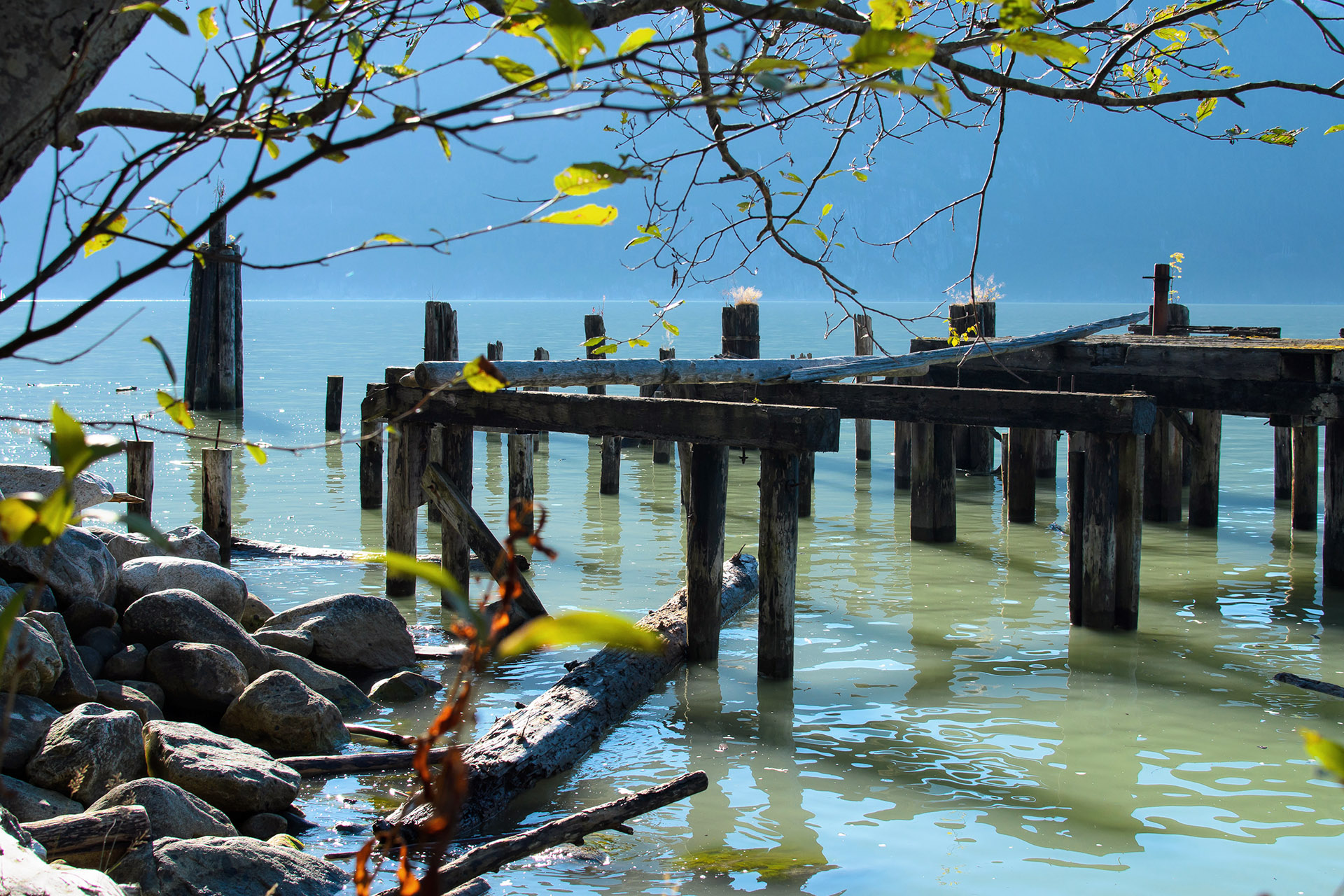
Britannia Beach pier debris in polluted waters of Howe Sound. The surviving piles of the Union Steamship dock.

A two-kilometre (1.2 mi) strip of coastal waters along Britannia Beach was seriously polluted, affecting 4.5 million juvenile chum salmon from the Squamish Estuary. A federal fisheries report revealed that spring salmon held in cages off Britannia Creek died in less than 48 hours because of the toxic metals in the water, whereas fish held off Porteau Cove to the south, had a 100% survival rate.

In the summer of 2001, the Province of British Columbia formally announced that a large-scale treatment plant would be built to neutralize the run-off coming from the old mine site. Although the treatment plant did not become fully operational until 2006, its construction marked a pivotal turning point for Howe Sound and the community of Britannia Beach. The plant, now operated by EPCOR Utilities, treats an average of 4.2 billion liters of run-off annually, removing an average of 226,000 kilograms of heavy metal contaminants.

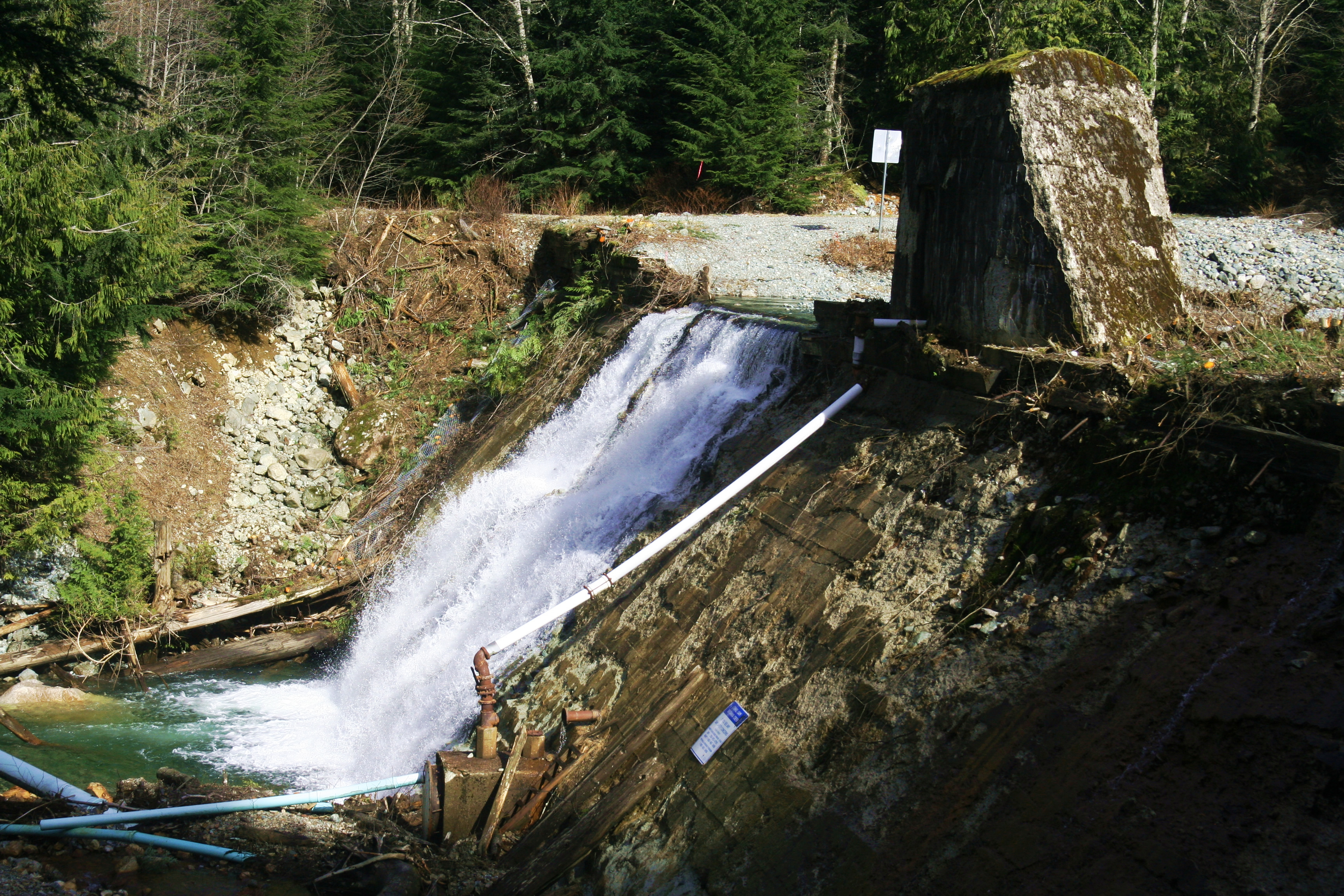
Tunnel Dam on Britannia Creek

Engineers from the Centre for Environmental Research in Minerals, Metals, and Materials at The University of British Columbia also installed a concrete plug in the 2,200-foot (670 m) Level adit in December 2001 as the initial step in constructing a more substantial Millennium Plug. The idea for the installation was to create a laboratory to study ways to seal mine adits using bulk materials. At the same time the installation would immediately stop all pollution from the 2200 Level into Jane Creek, a tributary of Britannia Creek. Field monitoring done in 2003, using intertidal algae and mussels as ecological indicators, showed that the recovery of coastal biological communities was actually minimal. However, recovery of Britannia Creek was significant and the amount of copper and zinc in the total discharge waters declined by about 20%.

As part of the reclamation work undertaken by the Provincial government, since 2004 they are undertaking an environmental monitoring program the recovery of Britannia Creek and Howe Sound. Initial assessments show significant recovery, however, the Provincial government has not yet completed its comprehensive environmental impact assessment to confirm this conclusion. Following completion of the Water Treatment Plant it was estimated that 90% of the pollution to Howe Sound had been stopped. Optimization of the groundwater management system by 2008, further increased the reduction to 98-99%.

In 2011, pink salmon returned to Britannia Creek for the first time in over a century. Other species that have returned to Howe Sound include killer whales and Pacific white-sided dolphins are now regularly seen near the creek's outlet.

== Events and Activities ==
During its successful years, Britannia Beach had many events for people to enjoy. The first of these being Miners Day. This was a day of celebration to honour those who kept the town going, the miners. Many events took place during Miners day which included drilling, mucking, diving (aquatic), running, and bicycle decorating competitions. The second major event was the Copper Queen pageant which was held from 1926 to 1966 during Victoria Day celebrations in May. The school children voted who should be named as Britannia Beach's Copper Queen and with each new Queen came a different variation of the crown she was presented, making each year unique to their own. Being Copper Queen had some responsibilities too as they had to attend local events and holiday festivities during their reign. Although Britannia Beach was essentially remote until the 1950s, there were plenty of recreational activities for everyone. In an interview with the Vancouver Sun, former resident Frances McKilligan stated that "Sports clubs, amateur theatre, hobby clubs and annual community celebrations took place throughout the year. Dances, parties, movies and picnics were held and there were ample areas for hiking, swimming and fishing with the beautiful Howe Sound as a backdrop."

== In the media ==
The 1995 Season 3 Episode 2 Paper Clip of the US TV show The X-Files was filmed specifically around the Britannia Mine Museum. The 2010 episode of the US TV show Psych, Dual Spires, was filmed almost entirely in Britannia Beach. In 2017, many scenes for The Crossing were filmed in and around the village. In the same year, scenes for Travelers were also shot in Britannia Beach. Parts of the second season of the HBO series The Last of Us were filmed in Brittania Beach.

== Bibliography ==
Province of BC Britannia Mine Remediation Project: www.britanniamine.ca

== Other sources ==
- An Analysis of Britannia
- Fisheries and Oceans Canada, Pacific Region
- North Shore News
