= Stawamus =

Stawamus is adapted from the Squamish language name Sta7mes.

- Stawamus Chief, a peak near Squamish, British Columbia, famed internationally for its rock climbing routes
- Stawamus Squaw, a peak adjacent to the Stawamus Chief
- Stawamus River, a river draining into Howe Sound at the village of Stawamus
- Stawamus Lake, a lake in the North Shore Mountains at the head of the Stawamus River
- Stawamus (village), a Squamish village on the Stawamus Indian Reserve No. 24 in British Columbia
