= Murrin Provincial Park =

Provincial park in British Columbia, Canada

- IUCN category II (national park)
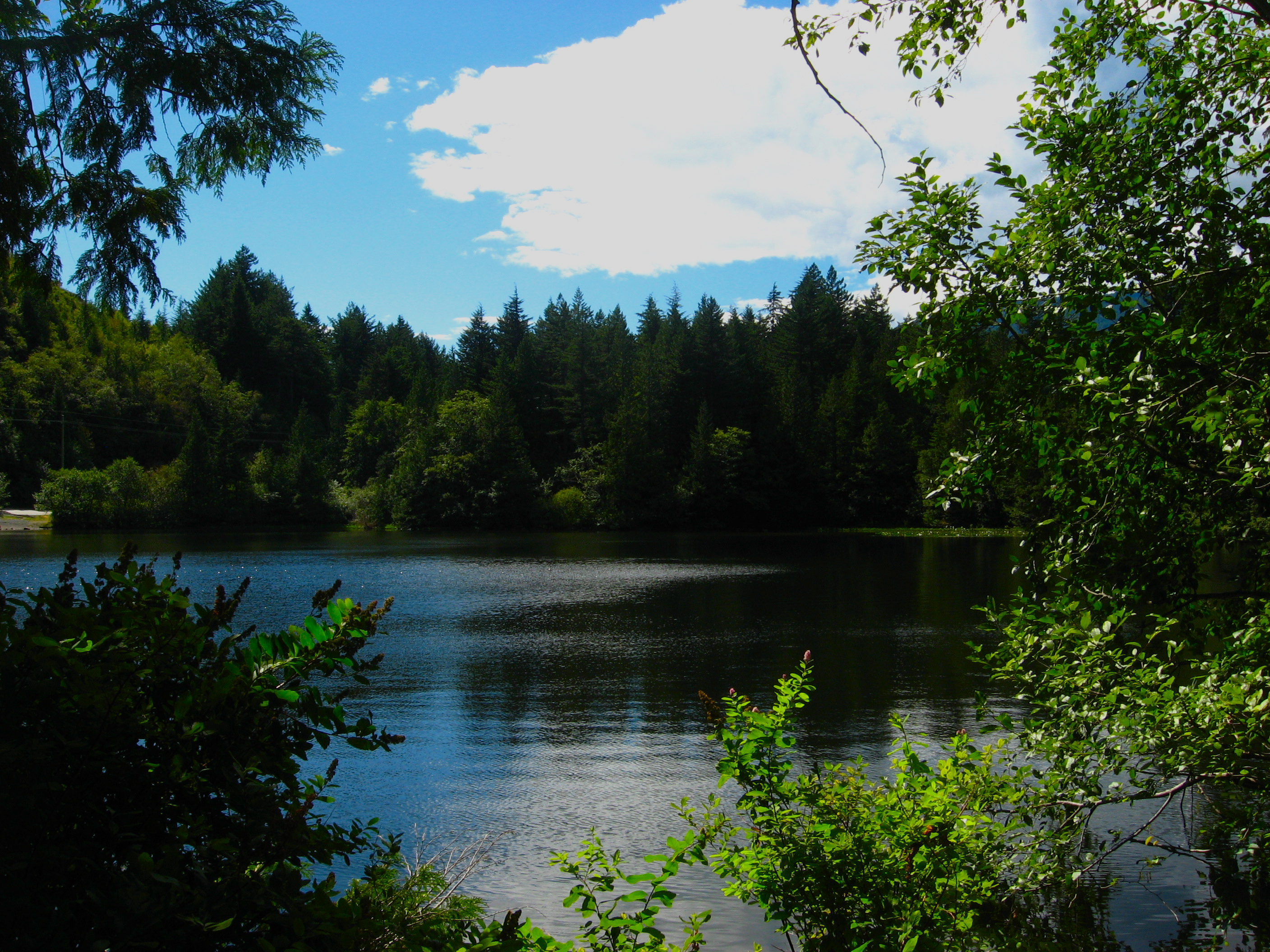
- Browning Lake, summer 2010
- Interactive map of Murrin Provincial Park
- Location: British Columbia, Canada
- Nearest city: Squamish
- Coordinates: 49°38′40″N 123°12′30″W
- Area: 24 hectares (59 acres)
- Established: May 1, 1962
- Governing body: BC Parks
- Website: www.env.gov.bc.ca/bcparks/explore/parkpgs/murrin/

Murrin Provincial Park is a provincial park in British Columbia, Canada, located just south of Squamish beside the Sea-to-Sky Highway. The park is approximately 24 ha. in size and has a popular highway-side picnic ground and small swimming lake (Browning Lake), but it is most notable for a collection of petroglyphs located away from the highway and accessed by trail. Several rockfaces in the area of the park are popular with the local mountain-climbing community, though the site is nowhere as busy as the nearby Stawamus Chief.

Other provincial parks nearby are Stawamus Chief Provincial Park, Shannon Falls Provincial Park and Porteau Cove Provincial Park.
