= Sea to Sky Gondola =

Gondola in British Columbia, Canada

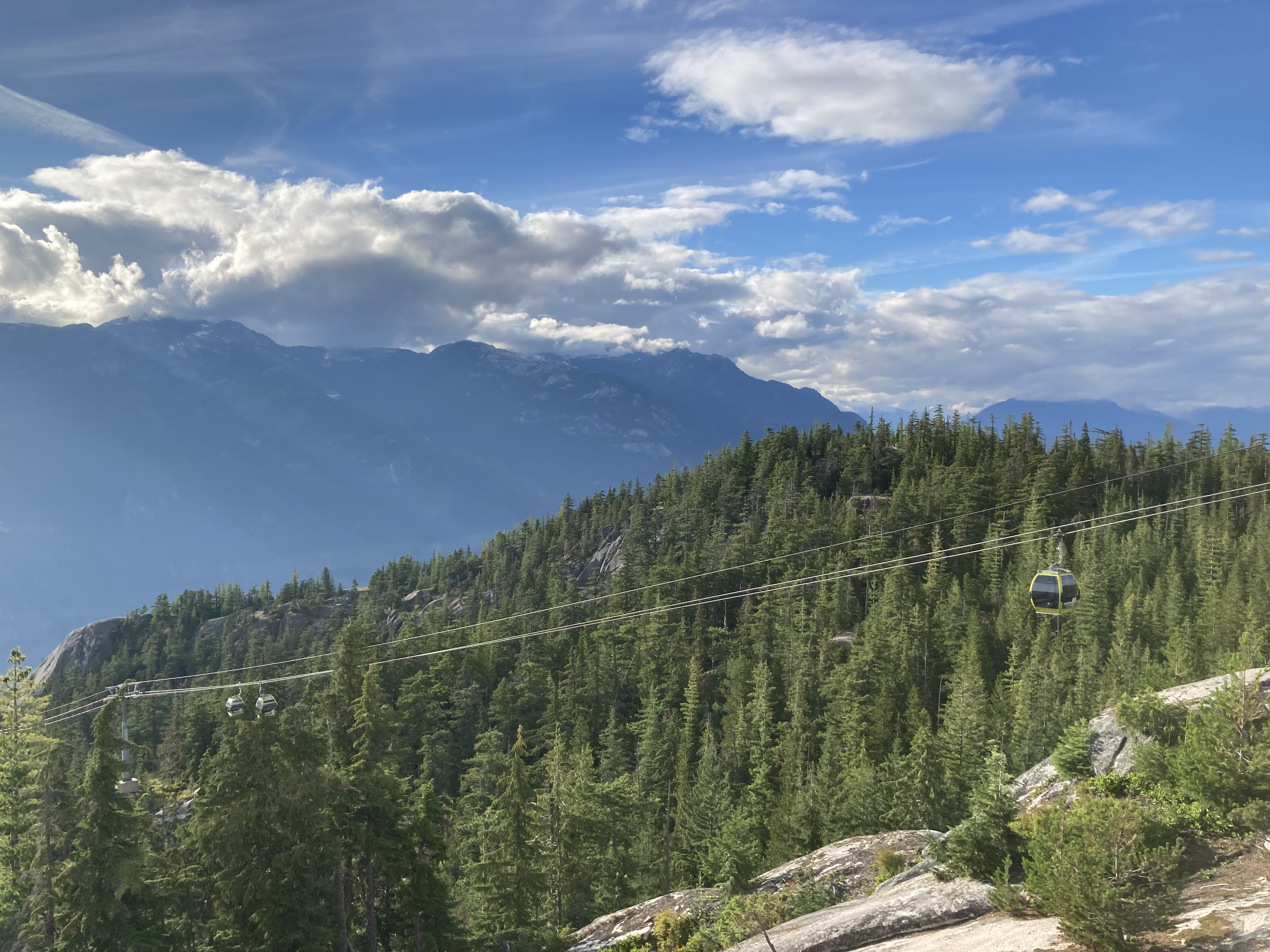
- The gondolas in 2022, from the Summit Lodge Viewing Platform

- Location within Squamish-Lillooet Regional District Location within British Columbia Location within Canada

Overview
- Status: Operational
- Character: Recreational
- Location: 36800 BC-99, Squamish, British Columbia
- Coordinates: 49°40′31″N 123°09′25″W
- Termini: Basecamp; Summit Lodge
- Elevation: lowest: 0 m (0 ft) highest: 885 m (2,904 ft)
- Construction cost: $7.6 million
- Construction begin: April 2013
- Open: May 16, 2014
- Closed: August 10, 2019 (first vandalism); September 14, 2020 (second vandalism)
- Reopened: February 14, 2020; June 11, 2021
- Website: www.seatoskygondola.com

Operation
- Owner: Trevor Dunn; David Greenfield; Michael Hutchison
- Operator: Sea to Sky Gondola LP
- No. of carriers: 39
- Carrier capacity: 8
- Ridership: 425,000 (2018)
- Operating times: Friday-Sunday; 9 AM-8 PM; Monday-Thursday; 9 AM-6 PM
- Trips daily: 600 hourly
- Trip duration: ~10 minutes
- Fare: ~$70

Technical features
- Aerial lift type: Aerial tramway
- Manufactured by: Doppelmayr/Garaventa Group
- Line length: 2 km (1.2 mi)
- Operating speed: ~12 km/h (7.5 mph)

The Sea to Sky Gondola is a privately owned recreational gondola lift south of Squamish, British Columbia. Located off of British Columbia Highway 99, it offers views over Howe Sound along with cafes, a lodge, hiking trails, and a suspension bridge, the Sky Pilot Suspension Bridge. The majority of the area is located inside of Stawamus Chief Provincial Park. The upper platform, on the slopes of Mount Habrich, is 885 m (2,904 ft) above sea level.

== History ==
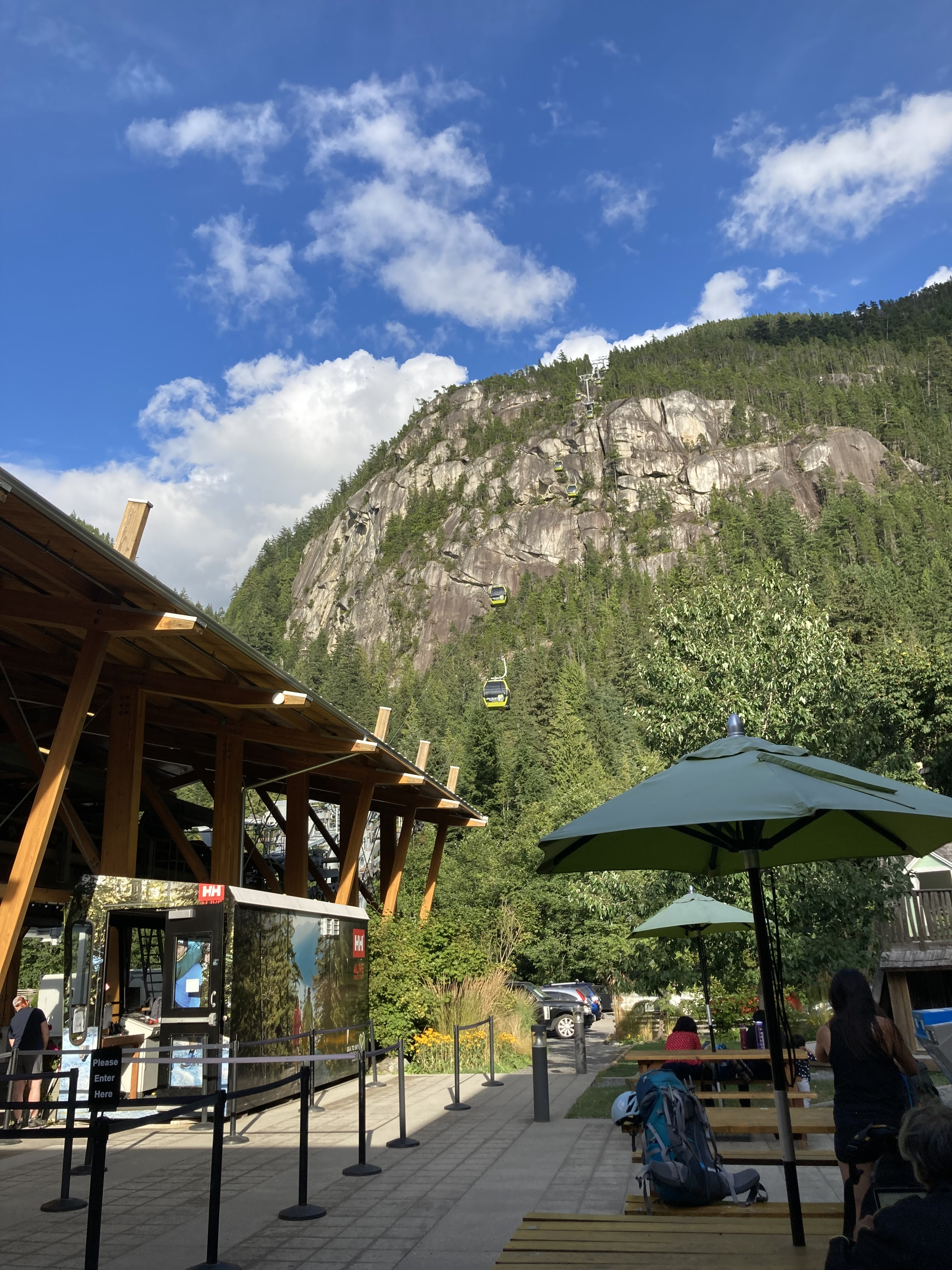
Basecamp, looking up the mountain

=== Construction ===
Construction on Basecamp, the lower area, started in April 2013. Some employees traveled to the headquarters of the Doppelmayr/Garaventa Group in Austria to purchase the onsite gondola, while others went to Switzerland to buy the newest passenger cabins, of the Omega IV 8 variety. As the snow melted, the company started surveying possible hiking trails. The general manager of the project was Jayson Faulkner. In July 2013, Ted Tempany, a prominent trail builder in British Columbia, was appointed to construct the hiking trails. The suspension bridge and two of the three viewing platforms were finished in October. In November, the first test gondola was launched. The gondola was opened to the public on May 16, 2014, having cost a total of $7.6 million. $22 million was invested in the project. It was built while respecting the Squamish people's natural environment.

=== Vandalism ===
The gondola was vandalised on August 10, 2019, by a person or persons unknown who cut a cable, causing thirty carriers to fall and be heavily damaged. To fix the cable and replace the carriers cost $2 million. It partially reopened on February 14, 2020, with increased security, and fully opened in May. Despite the improved measures, the cable was cut again on the morning of September 14, 2020. This time, only six carriers remained operable, with the other 33 having to be restored. The gondola closed for eight months as a result. Two years later, in 2022, the Royal Canadian Mounted Police released thermal imaging of the 2020 scene showing that a security guard was almost hit by one of the cables. The Sea to Sky Gondola's company sued the security system company, Unified Systems, as they had apparently not been on site during the sabotage. It also offered $500,000 for information relating to the vandals' capture. As of February 2026, nobody had been prosecuted.

== Features ==
=== Gondola ===
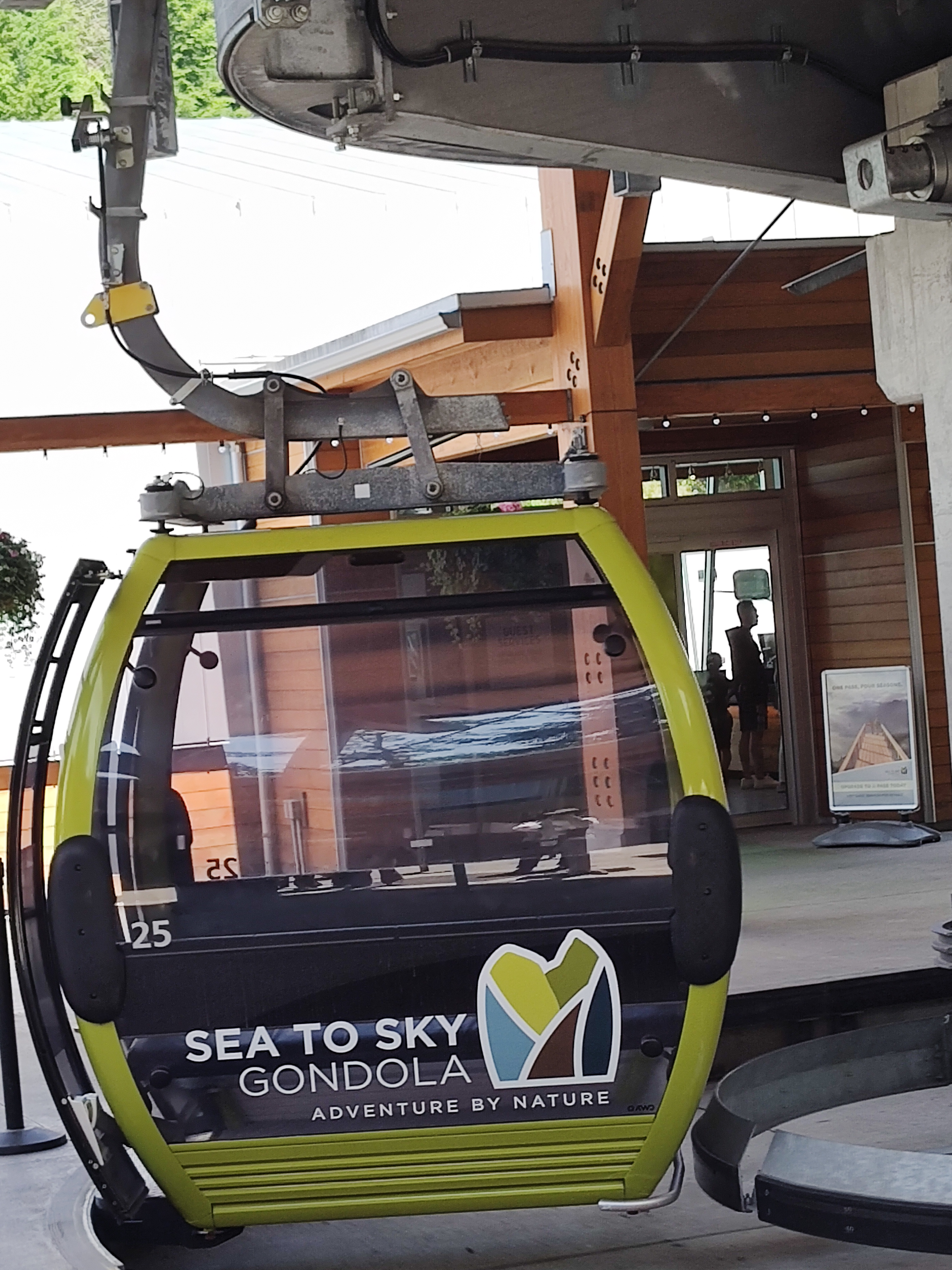
A picture of a car of the gondola.

The gondola is manufactured by the Austrian Doppelmayr/Garaventa Group, and the cabins are made by its Switz CWA Constructions division, at a cost of $50,000 (equivalent to $66,748 in 2025). They are wheelchair and stroller accessible and have floor-to-ceiling windows made of glass. Each of the 39 gondolas can carry eight people, with a maximum load of 640 kg (1,410 lb).

The gondola ride itself provides views of two provincial parks, Stawamus Chief and Shannon Falls. The last descent is one hour after the final ascent.

=== Sky Pilot Suspension Bridge ===
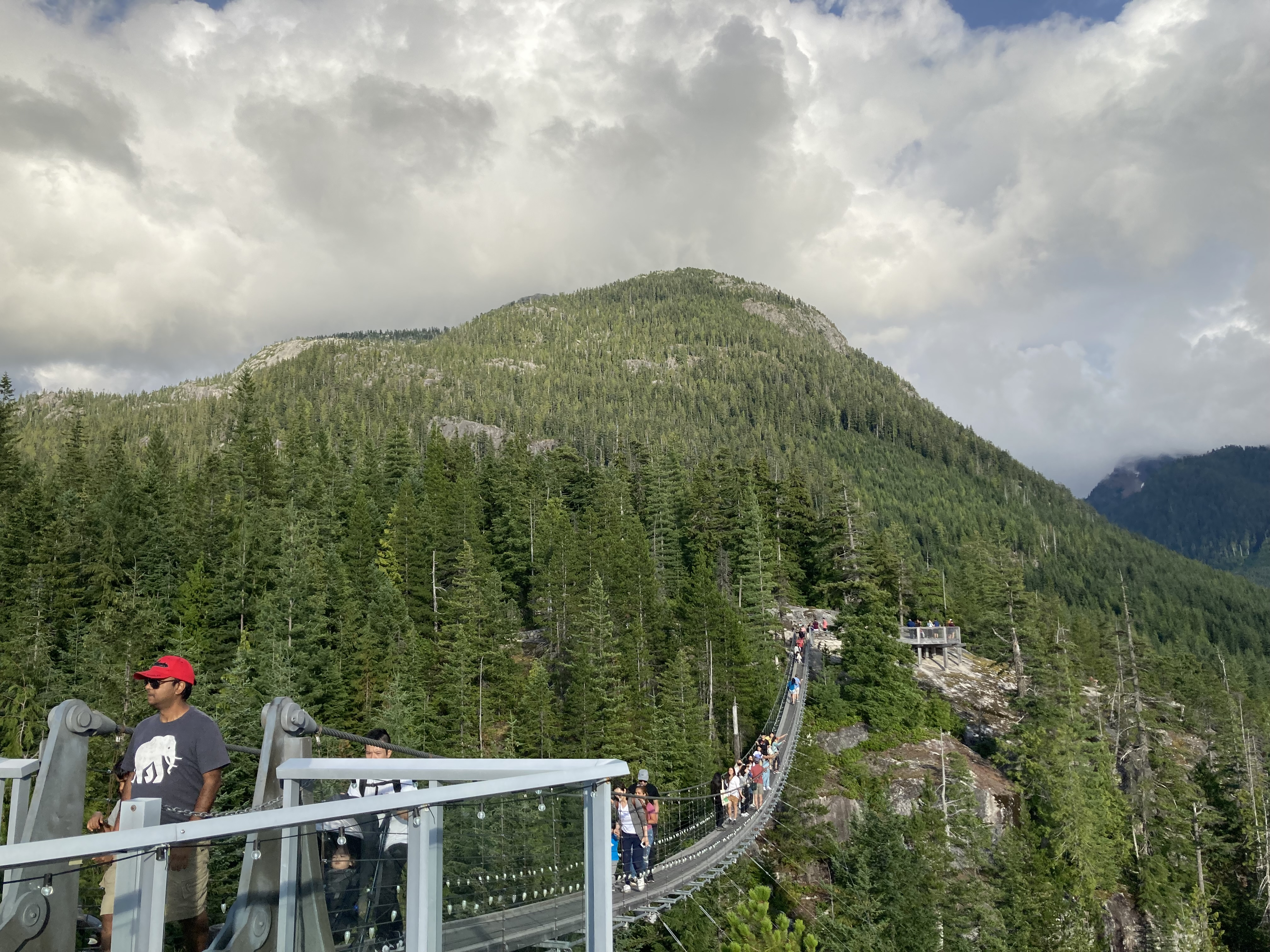
The suspension bridge from the main platform; the Spirit Viewing Platform can be seen in the background

The bridge, which was built by Macdonald & Lawrence Timber Framing Ltd., a firm which is known for its restoration of Kinsol Trestle, was finished in October 2013. It is 95 m (312 ft) long, and is open year-round. It is also wheelchair and stroller accessible. The Spirit Viewing Platform can be accessed from here.

=== Viewing points ===
The upper platform has three main designated viewing platforms, Summit Lodge, Spirit, and Chief Overlook. The Summit Lodge Viewing Platform is close to the gondola unloading station and is 5,000 sq ft (460 m^{2}) in size. Howe Sound, Tantalus Range, Diamond Head, and Sky Pilot Mountain can be seen from here. Spirit is found across the Sky Pilot Suspension Bridge and presents informative displays showcasing the history of the Squamish people. It has also been utilized as a wedding location. Finally, Chief Overlook is located in the middle of the Panorama Trail, a short walk from the Summit Lodge. One can find the Mamquam Mountain, Atwell Peak, and the backside of the Stawamus Chief there.

=== Summit Lodge ===
Summit Lodge is an eatery, bar, and gift shop. At 9,000 sq ft (840 m^{2}), it is surrounded by the Summit Lodge Viewing Platform. The lodge was completed in Spring 2014, being made of over 700 local Douglas fir beams of varying size. The largest of those beams was 70 ft (21 m) long and 36 in (91 cm) wide.

== Recreation ==
In the summer months, live music and yoga are hosted. In the winter, one can snowshoe, tube, and ski.

=== Hiking ===
The area has twelve hiking trails, six frontcountry and six backcountry, with rock climbing and via ferrata are also available. There are two different guided tours throughout the trails. A 6.5 km (4.0 mi) hike up the mountain is also available, in which dogs can hike up with their owners and ride down.

== Incidents ==
In the morning of February 4, 2014, prior to the gondola's public opening, a gondola came off the line during routine testing. No one was injured and the British Columbia Safety Authority along with the Doppelmayr/Garaventa Group decided that the cause was "a unique weather event."

== In media ==
A scene in both of the series Altered Carbon and The Magicians was shot on the suspension bridge. The gondola was featured on the first leg of The Amazing Race Canada 6 in which teams had to ride it to the top, getting their next clue at the Panorama Trail. A Dog's Way Home also featured the bridge.
