= Shannon Falls Provincial Park =

Provincial park in British Columbia, Canada

- IUCN category III (natural monument or feature)
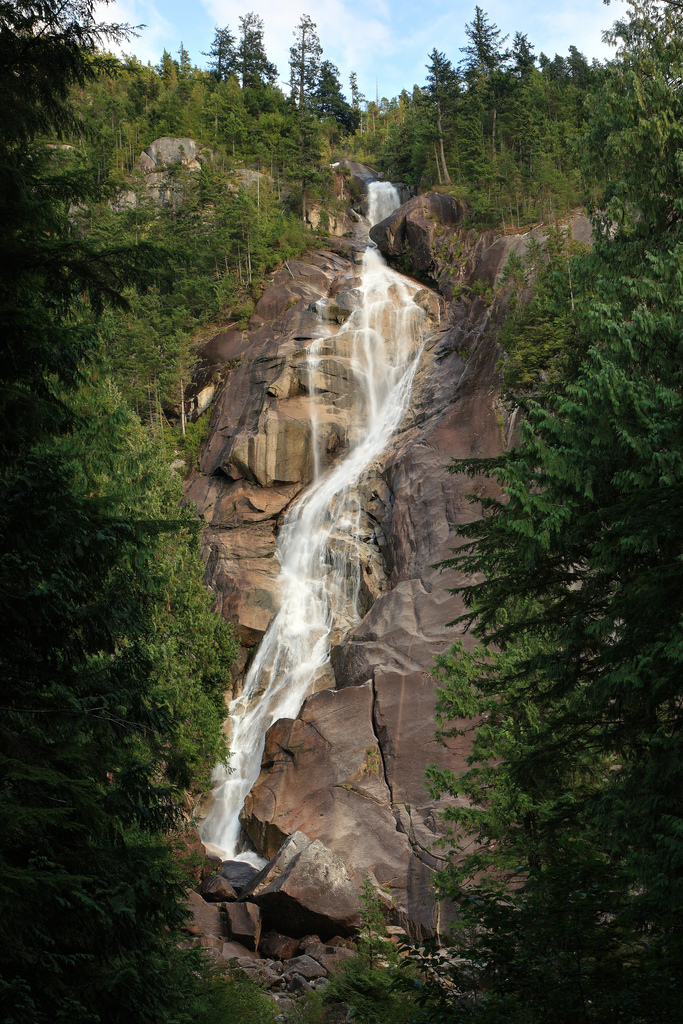
- Shannon Falls

- Location within British Columbia
- Interactive map of Shannon Falls Provincial Park
- Location: British Columbia, Canada
- Nearest city: Squamish
- Coordinates: 49°40′01″N 123°09′50″W
- Area: 87 hectares (210 acres)
- Established: 1984
- Visitors: 629,206 (in 2017-18)
- Governing body: BC Parks
- Website: bcparks.ca/shannon-falls-park/

Shannon Falls Provincial Park is a provincial park in British Columbia, Canada. It is located 58 kilometres (36 mi) from Vancouver and 2 kilometres (1.2 mi) south of Squamish along the Sea to Sky Highway.

The park covers an area of 87 hectares (210 acres). The main point of interest is Shannon Falls, the third highest waterfall in BC, where water falls from a height of 335 metres (1,099 ft). The falls are named after a William Shannon who first settled the property in 1889 and made bricks in the area.

The park also protects the surrounding area on the north-east shore of the Howe Sound.

Just to the north are Murrin Provincial Park and Stawamus Chief Provincial Park. Located immediately across the highway from Shannon Falls is a privately operated campground and restaurant, plus the entrance to the Darrell Bay ferry terminal for Woodfibre (Darrell Bay was formerly named Shannon Bay). The Sea to Sky Gondola adjoins the park. The gondola line was deliberately cut in 2019 and again in 2020 after repairs.

The falls and adjoining woods are commonly used in television and film production.

Hikers can view Shannon Creek below the falls in the park and above the falls via the Sea to Summit Trail. The adjacent cliff walls are used by rock climbers. Shannon Falls rarely freezes; when it does, it's the subject of intense ice climbing interest.

== Gallery ==
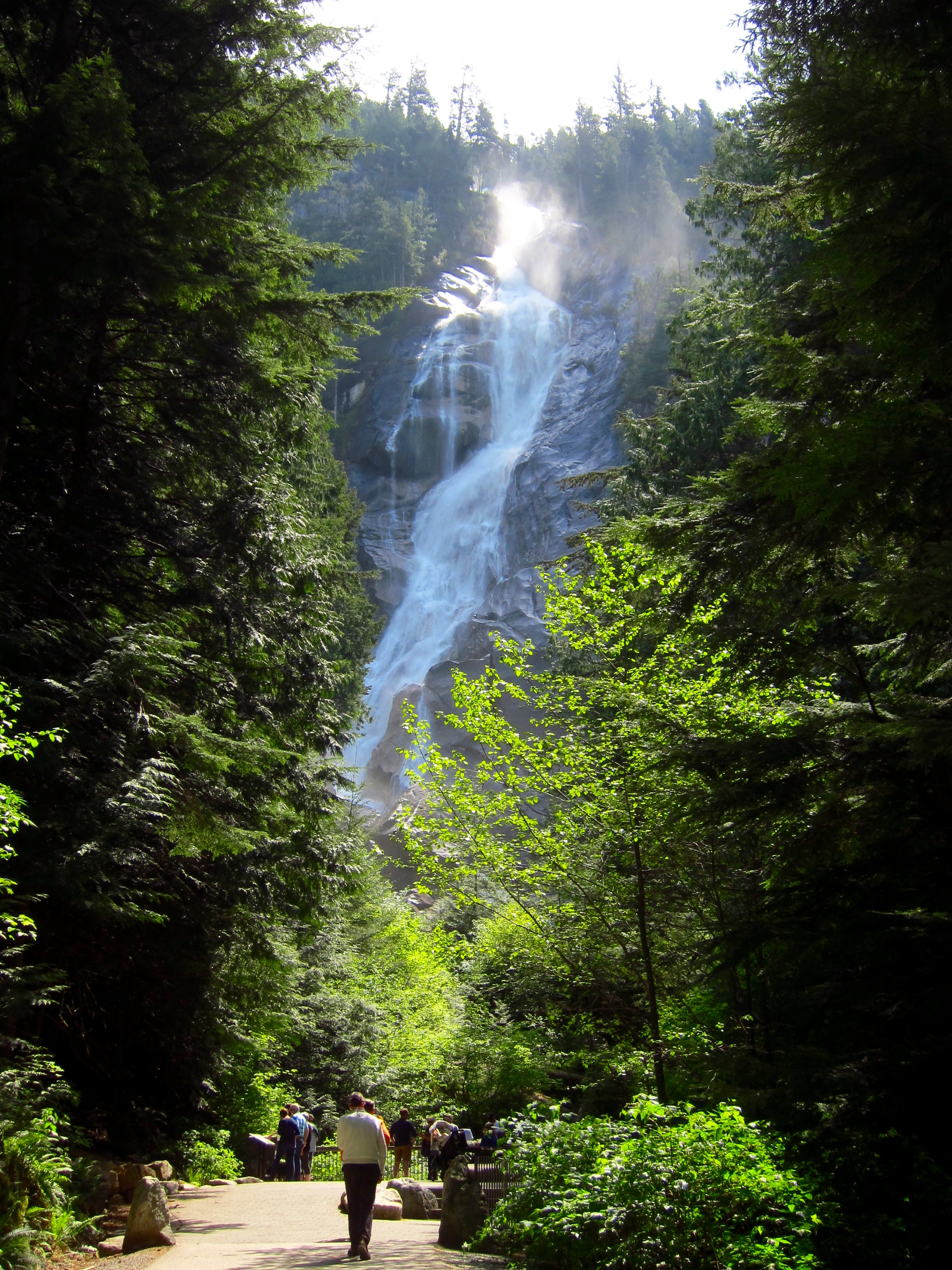
Shannon Falls Provincial Park

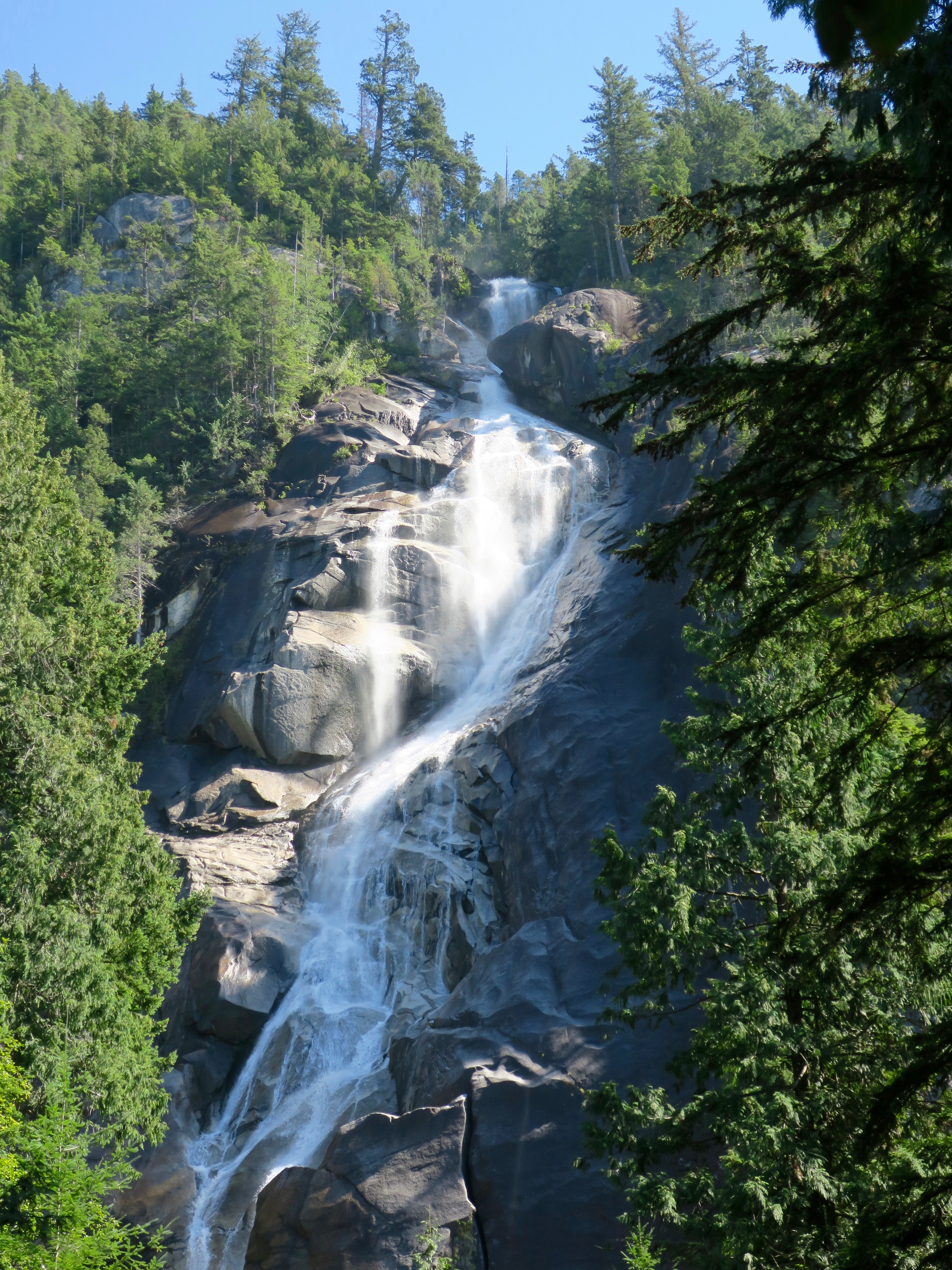
Shannon Falls Provincial Park

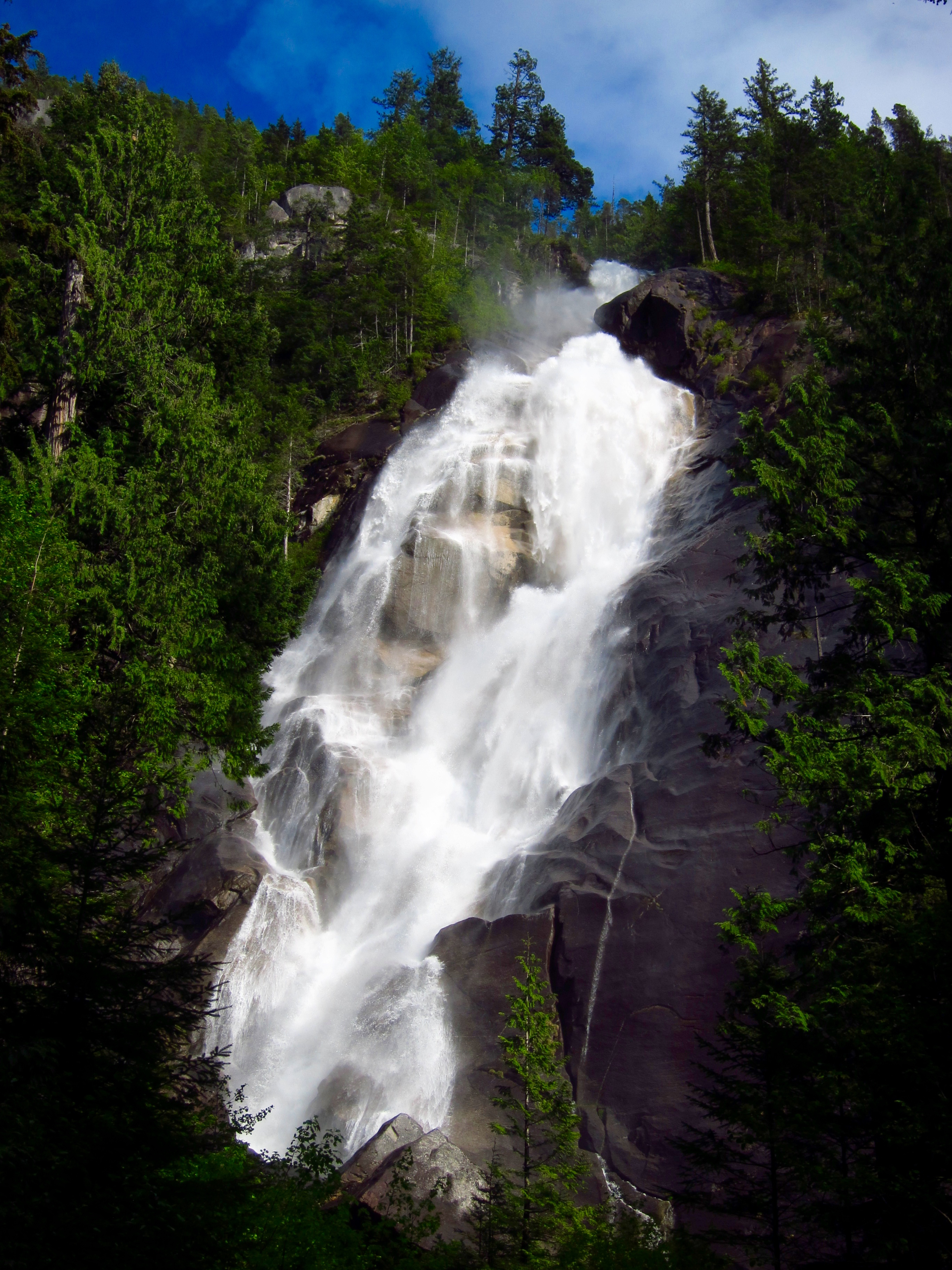
Shannon Falls Provincial Park

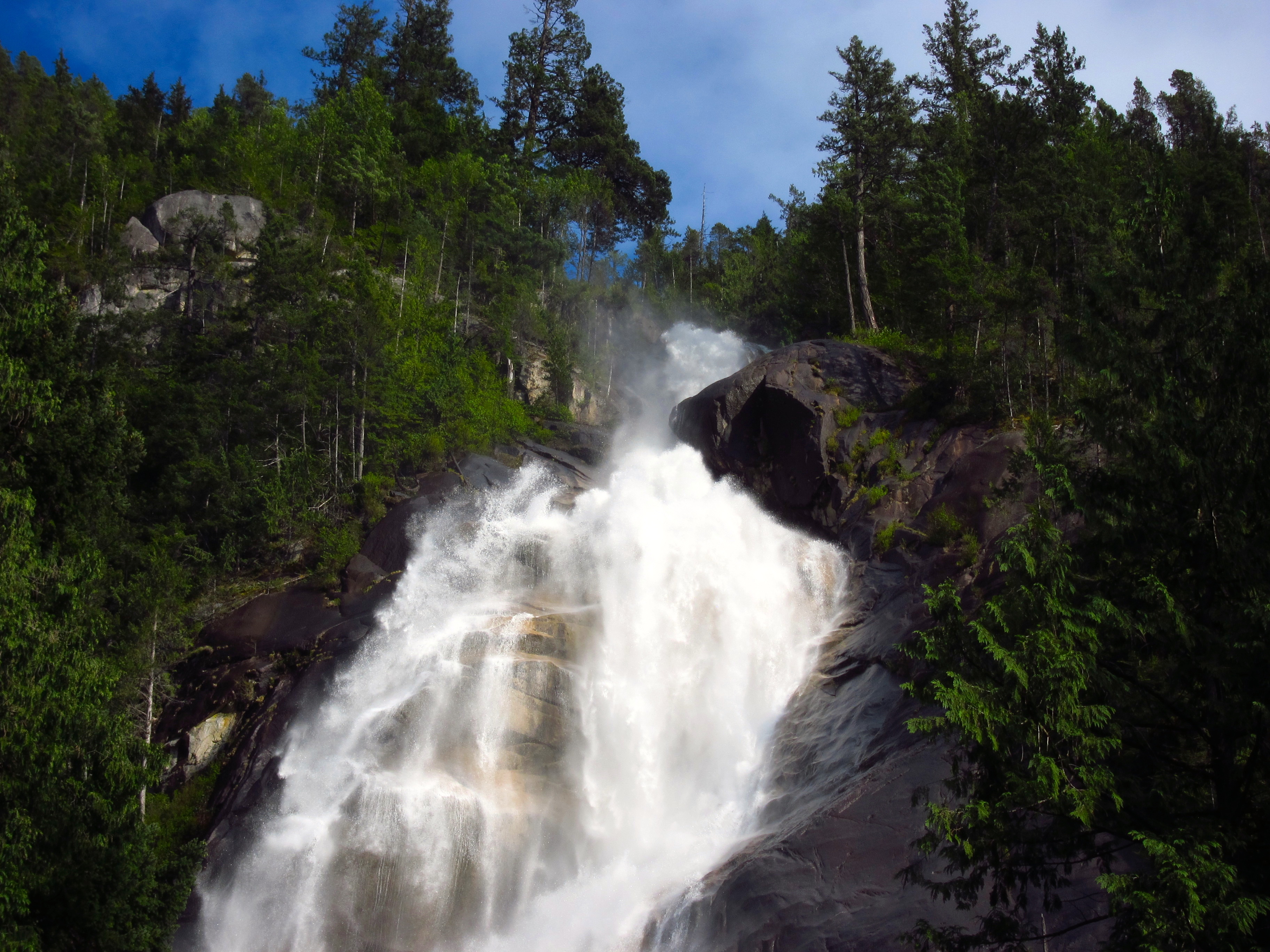
Shannon Falls Provincial Park

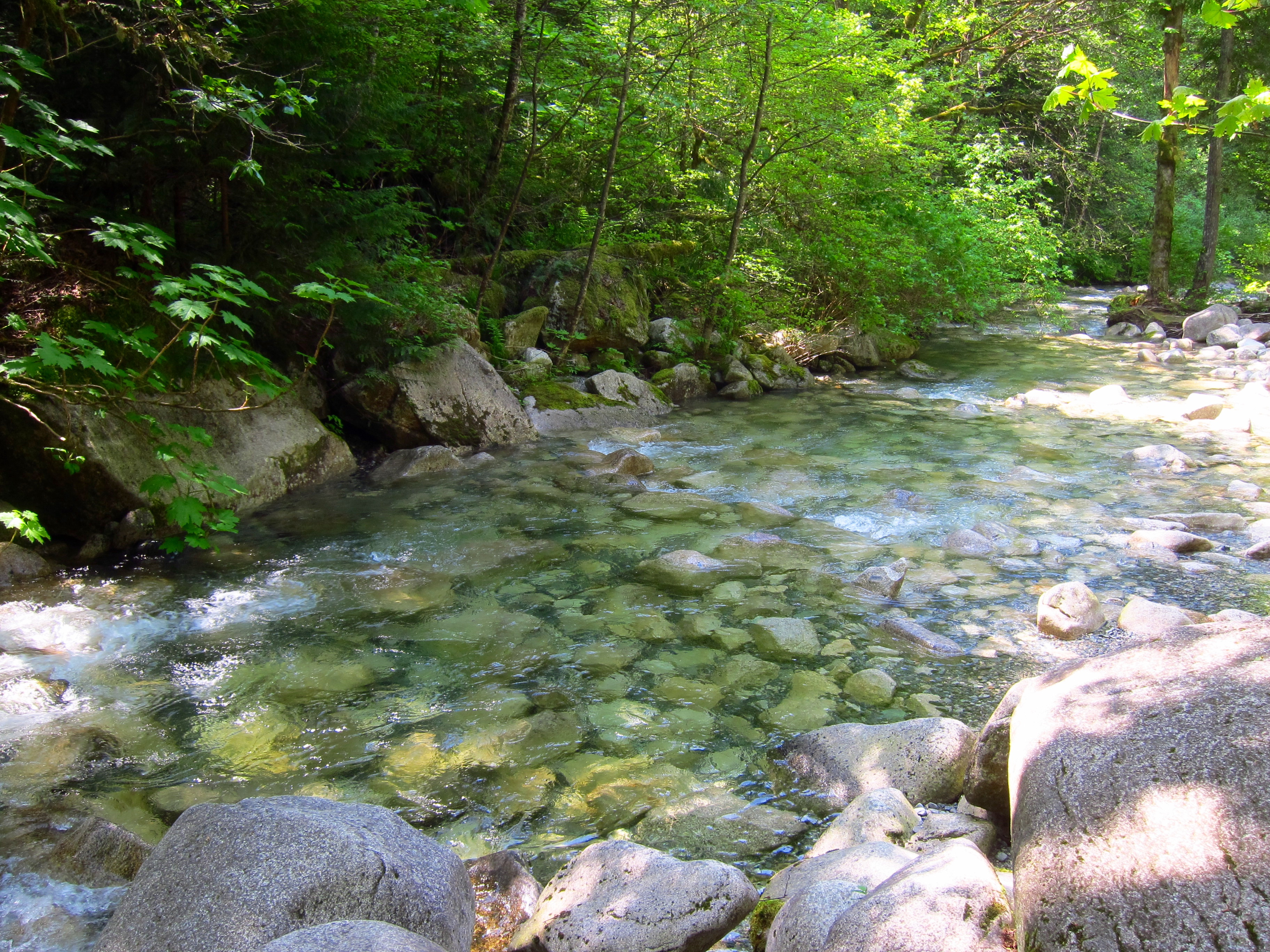
Shannon Falls Provincial Park

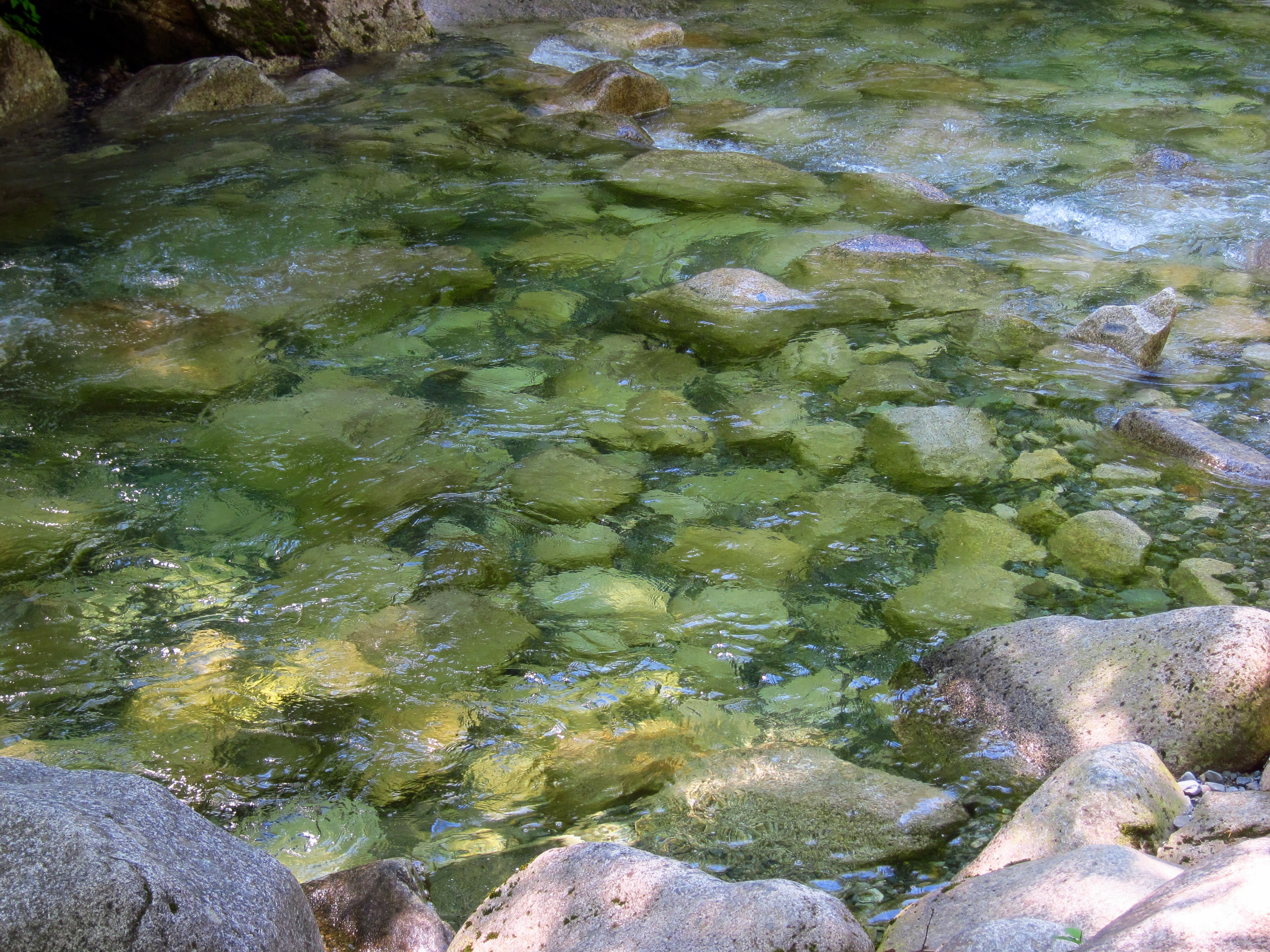
Shannon Falls Provincial Park

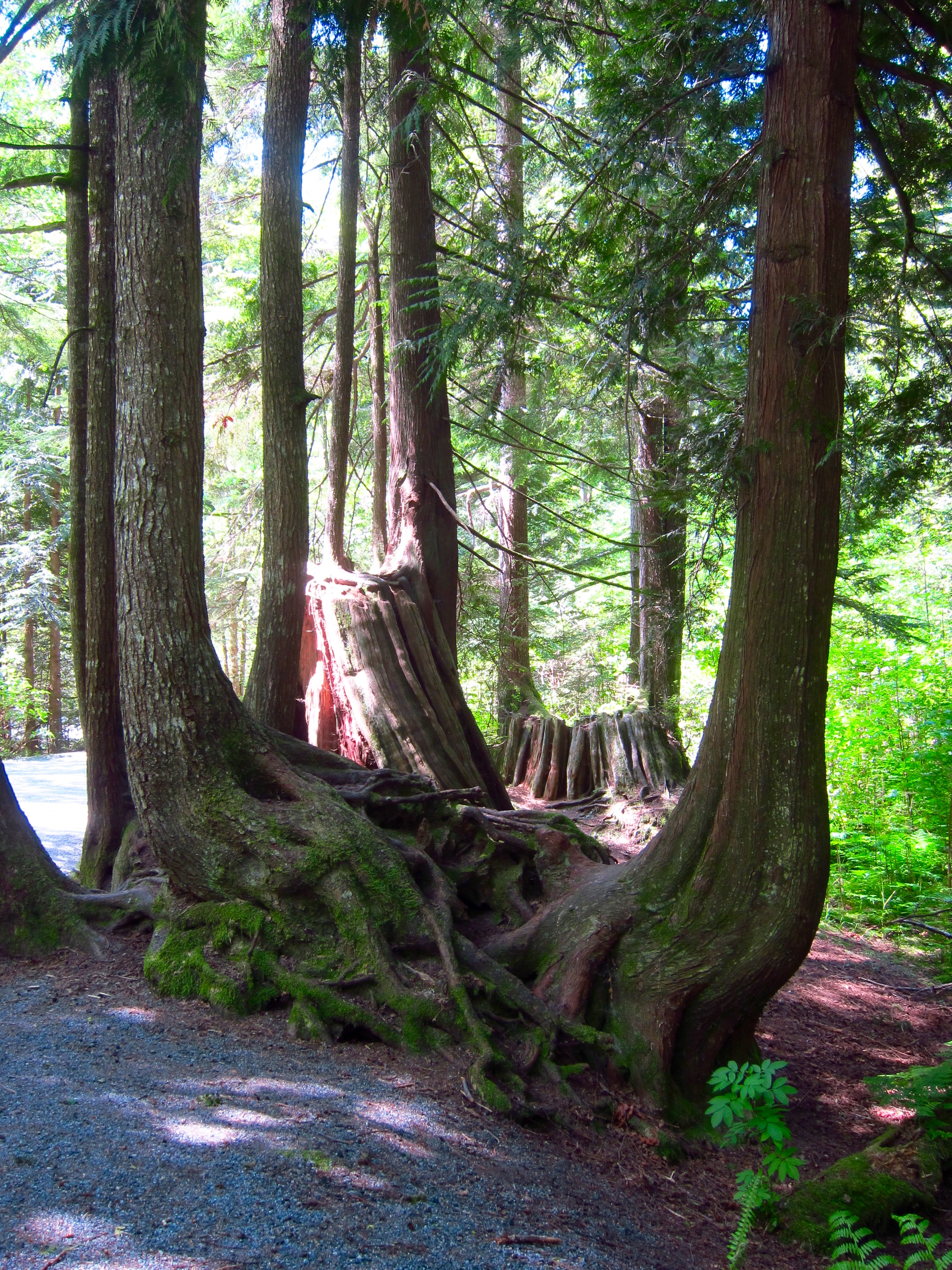
Shannon Falls Provincial Park

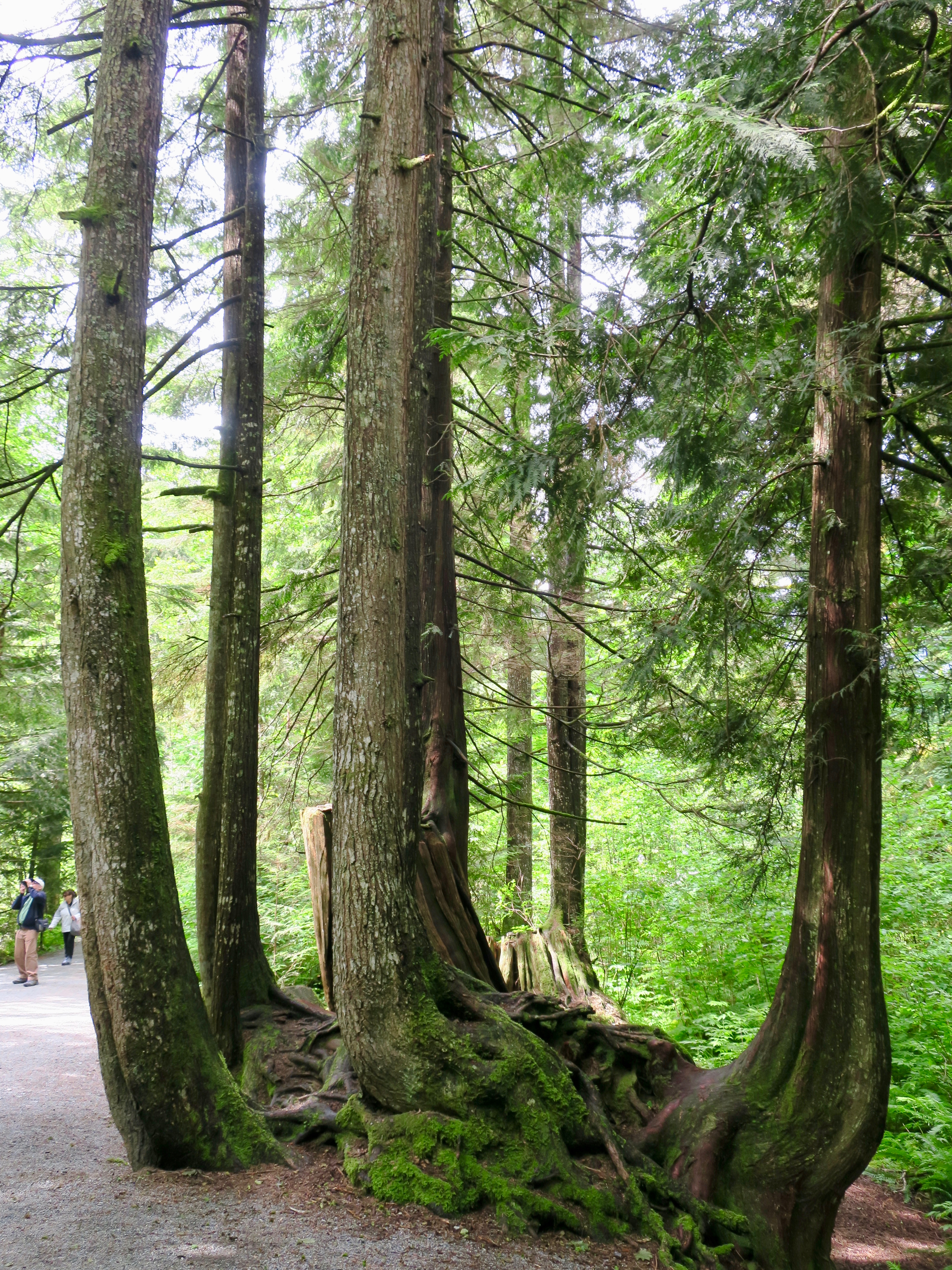
Shannon Falls Provincial Park

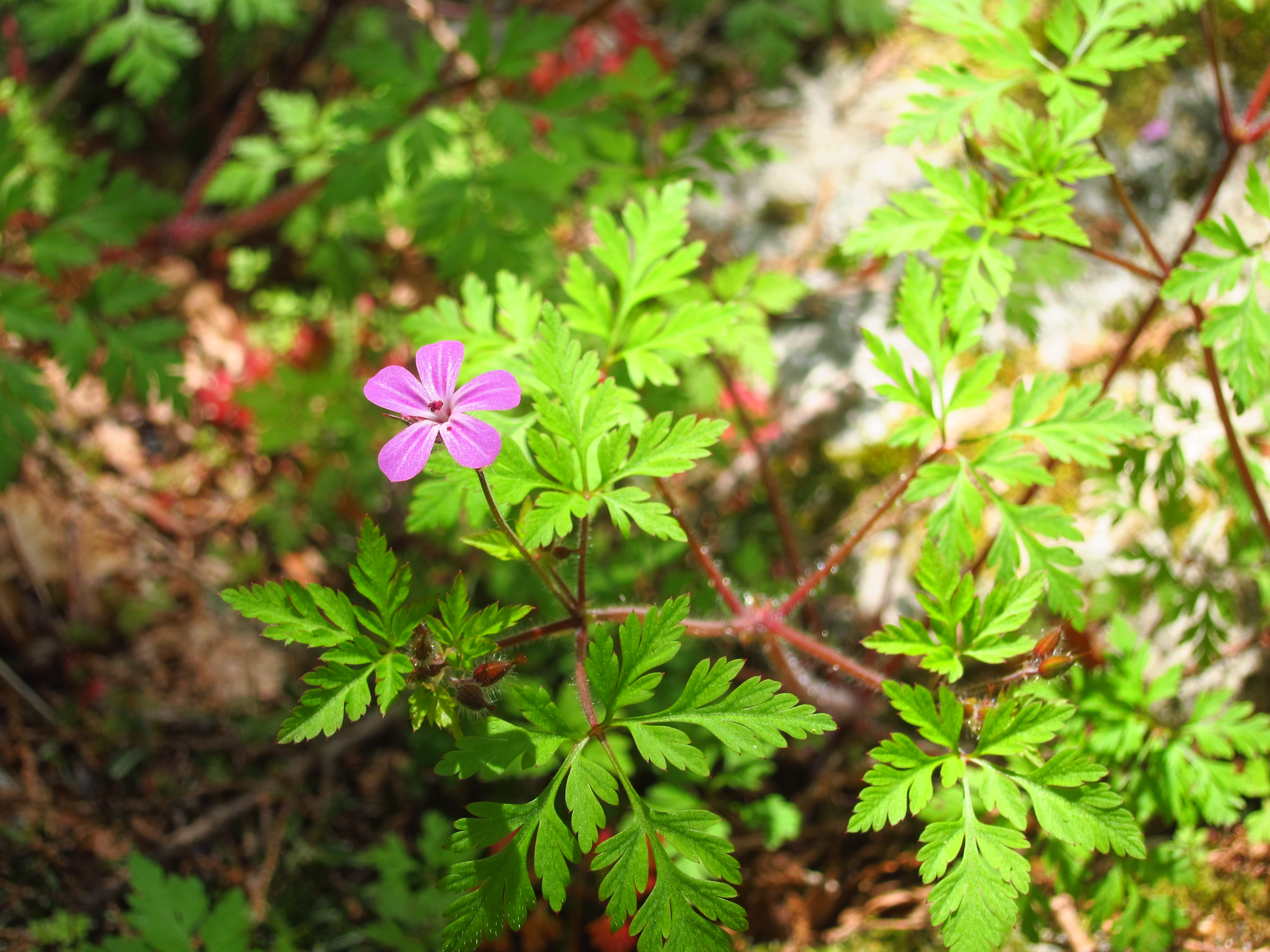
Shannon Falls Provincial Park

== See also ==
- List of waterfalls
- List of waterfalls of Canada
- List of waterfalls of British Columbia
