= Stawamus (village) =

First Nation reserve in British Columbia, Canada

Stawamus (St'a7mes /ˈstɑːwəmʊs/ or /ˈstɑːʔəməs/, Squamish: [st’aʔməs]) is a village at the head of Howe Sound, located on Stawamus Indian Reserve No. 24, at the mouth of the Stawamus River and Mamquam Blind Channel, 1km south of Squamish, British Columbia. The village is home to the indigenous Squamish people and houses satellite offices of the Squamish Nation. The village is also the centre for administrative, educational and health services in the Upper Squamish region of the Squamish Nation.

== Population ==
The 2011 National Household Survey of the Census of Canada gives the population of the Indian reserve encompassing this village as 95, 10 of whom are non-aboriginal in origin and are of British Isles ethnic origin). The Community Profile for the same year, however, says 97 and 100.

== See also ==
- History of the Squamish people
- Squamish Nation
- Stawamus (disambiguation)
- List of Squamish villages
