= Stawamus River =

- Location within British Columbia

Location
- Country: Canada
- Province: British Columbia
- District: New Westminster Land District

Physical characteristics
- Source: Stawamus Lake
  - location: Pacific Ranges
  - coordinates: 49°36′37″N 123°02′33″W
  - elevation: 1,040 m (3,410 ft)
- Mouth: Squamish Harbour
  - location: Howe Sound
  - coordinates: 49°41′18″N 123°09′17″W
  - elevation: 0 m (0 ft)

The Stawamus River /stəˈwɑːmʊs/ is a small, creek-like river in British Columbia. It enters the Howe Sound east of the mouth of the Squamish River.

== Course ==
The Stawamus River begins at the outlet of Stawamus Lake. It flows north for about 5.3 kilometres (3.3 mi) before turning northwest for about 6.7 kilometres (4.2 mi) until it enters the District of Squamish. After emerging from the mountains and entering Squamish, it turns west for about 4 kilometres (2.5 mi) until it reaches its mouth in the Squamish River. The Stawamus has no major tributaries.

== See also ==
- Stawamus Chief
- Slhanay
- List of rivers of British Columbia
