= Stawamus Chief =

Mountain in British Columbia, Canada

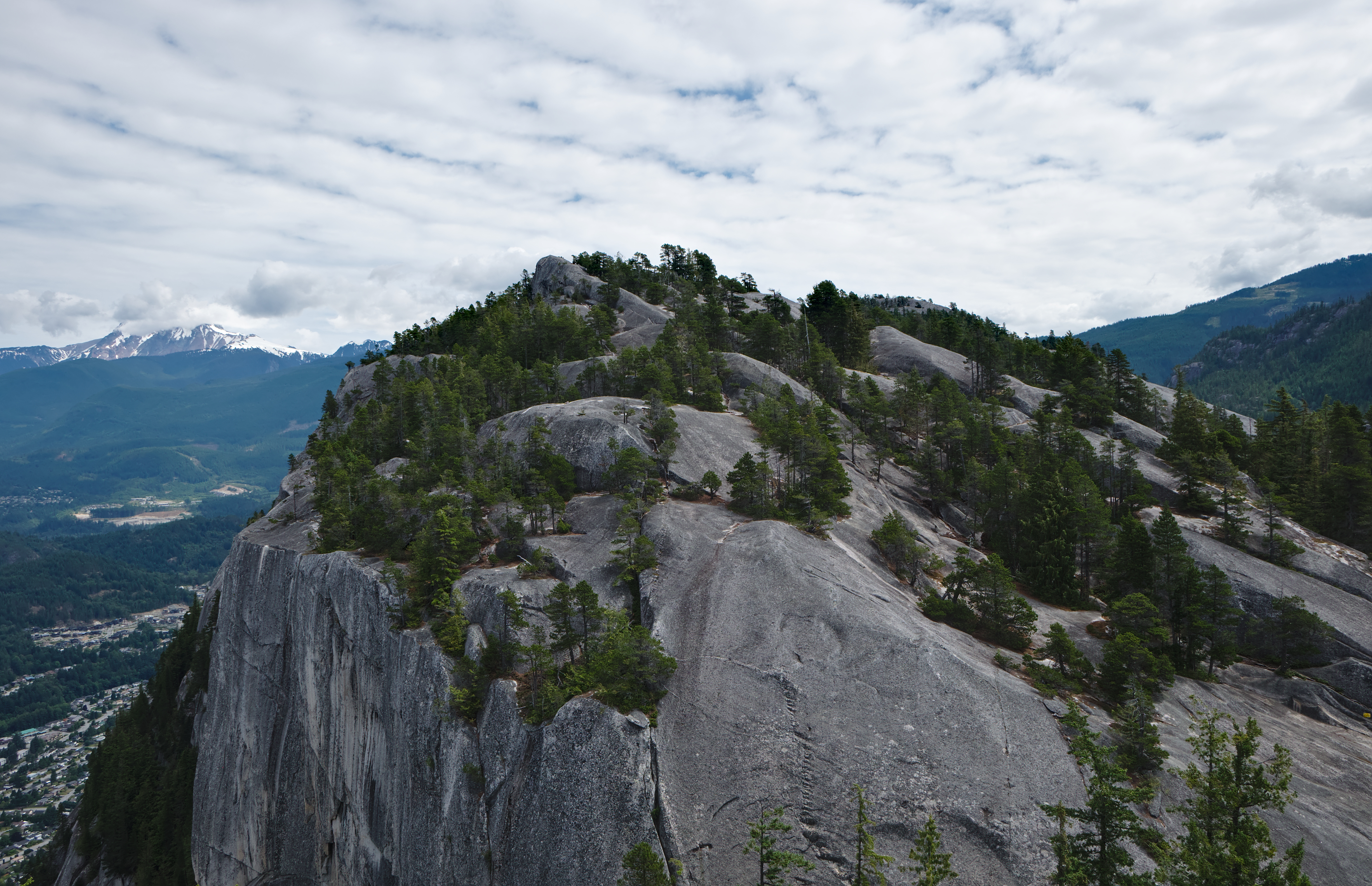
- Stawamus Chief, second peak seen from the first

Highest point
- Elevation: 702 m (2,303 ft)
- Prominence: 417 m (1,368 ft)
- Listing: Mountains of British Columbia
- Coordinates: 49°41′02″N 123°08′30″W

Geography
- Location within British Columbia
- Location in Stawamus Chief Provincial Park
- Location: British Columbia, Canada
- District: New Westminster Land District
- Parent range: Pacific Ranges
- Topo map: NTS 92G11 Squamish

Geology
- Rock age(s): Formed Late Cretaceous; Exposed Holocene
- Mountain type: Granite dome

Climbing
- First ascent: Prehistoric
- Easiest route: Hike

The Stawamus Chief, officially Stawamus Chief Mountain (often referred to as simply The Chief, or less commonly Squamish Chief), is a granitic dome located adjacent to the town of Squamish, British Columbia, Canada. It towers over 700 m (2,297 ft) above the waters of nearby Howe Sound. It is one of the largest granite monoliths in the world.

The Squamish, the indigenous people from this area, consider the Chief to be a place of spiritual significance. The Squamish language name for the mountain is Siy̓ám̓ Smánit. Siy̓ám̓ is usually translated as "chief", though it is really a social ranking), and their traditions say it is a longhouse transformed to stone by Xáays, as the Transformer Brothers are known in this language. The great cleft in the mountain's cliff-face in Squamish legend is a mark of corrosion left by the skin of Sínulhka, a giant two-headed sea serpent.

The mountain gets its name from the Squamish village near its foot, Stawamus (Stʼa7mes), as is also the case with the Stawamus River and Stawamus Lake.

== The park ==
In 1997, the Stawamus Chief Provincial Park was established by the British Columbia Ministry of the Environment. The park is over five square kilometres in area and encompasses not only the Chief but also Slhanay, a slightly smaller granitic dome located a short distance to the north-east. Also featured in the park are a walk-in campground and a number of maintained hiking trails which lead through the forest of the Chief's "backside" to several summit areas.

In the spring of 2009, a new pedestrian bridge was opened across the highway. It provides access to the park from a new southbound parking lot in addition to linking the climbing areas of The Chief with those on the granite faces of Malamute Bluffs. This bridge (officially known as Stawamus Chief Pedestrian Overpass) was built as part of the Winter Olympic upgrades of the Sea to Sky Highway.

== Geology ==
The Chief is part of a medium-sized pluton of a granitic rock (granodiorite) that was initially formed in the early Cretaceous (approximately 100 million years ago) by the slow cooling and solidification of molten magma deep below the surface of the Earth.

Exhumation of the granodiorite body probably occurred mostly by erosion of overlying rocks over tens of millions of years, with glacial erosion processes dominating exhumation over the last 2.5 million years. Once exposed at the surface, the original granodiorite body was shaped by glacial erosion, which is responsible for the tall steep walls that define the Chief, as well as the excavation of Howe Sound, a fjord. Classic hallmarks of glacial erosion are ubiquitous, especially polished, striated surfaces. Polish and striations observable at the very summit of the formation require that, at the peak of glaciation, the entire formation was buried under a substantial thickness of ice.

The striking gullies that separate and define the three summits of the Chief are the result of fracturing and mass-wasting of large blocks along a series of vertical, and roughly north–south oriented deep-seated fracture sets (joints).

The Chief may be the root of an extinct volcano because no volcanic activity has occurred in the Squamish area from about 86 million years ago to the beginning of Garibaldi Volcanic Belt volcanism about 2-3 million years ago. In the Squamish area, Garibaldi Volcanic Belt volcanism ceased during or shortly after the end of the last ice age.

== Topography and features ==
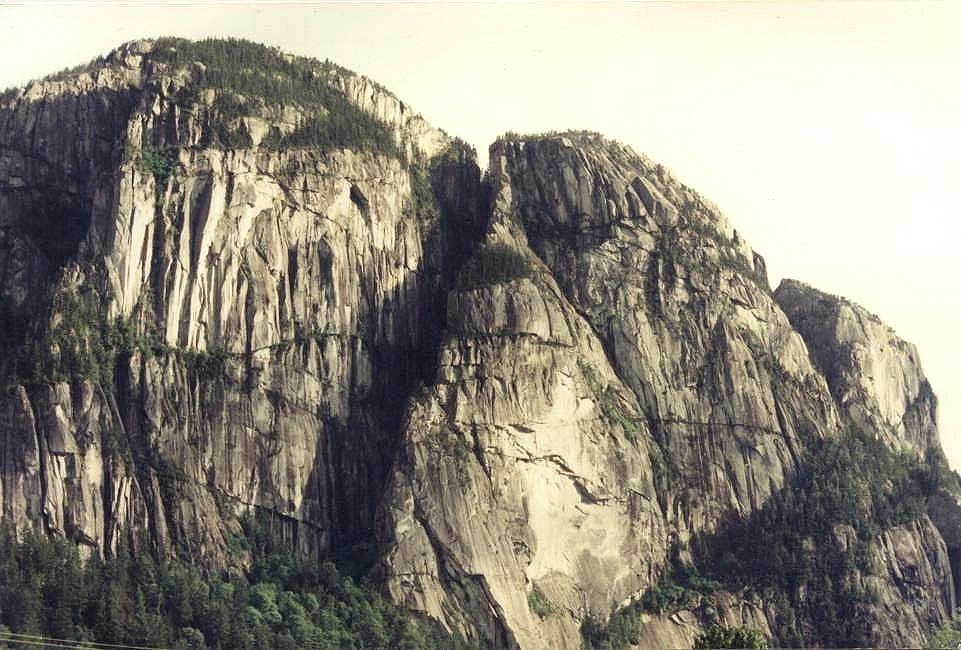
Stawamus Chief as seen from Valleycliffe neighbourhood in Squamish

The Chief measures approximately three square kilometres. In summary, there are several summits separated by several deep gullies. Steep cliffs separate the summits from the forest floor in many places, especially the western faces.

=== Summits ===
There are three main summit areas:

- First Peak or the South Summit (610 m (2,001 ft))
- Second Peak or the Centre Summit (655 m (2,149 ft))
- Third Peak or the North Summit (702 m (2,303 ft))

Each summit features an expanse of fine glacier-polished granodiorite and views in all directions. Third Peak is a bit more remote and isolated and is less popular with tourists.

An additional summit area lies to the north of all the summits. This area is called the Zodiac Summit. Although it can be considered a sub-summit of Third Peak, it is perhaps the most isolated area of the Chief. No proper trail leads to the Zodiac Summit; there are only faint tracks here and there among the trees.

=== Hiking trails ===
All of the three main summits are accessible via the Chief's maintained backside hiking trails. These trails are steep and rugged. In several high places there are short sections of "trail" that are so steep or slippery, that chains and ladders have been bolted to the rock for aid. The main attraction at the chief is the large granitic façade which is accessed by the chief trail or by rock climbing. The several peaks offer a view of the Sea to Sky Highway 99 and the river below. The summits have no railings or safety installations, making it possible to fall off the face of the cliff.

== Characteristics ==
=== Gullies ===
The three main summits of the Chief are separated by several deep clefts known as the gullies. These chasms are steep and are partially filled with debris, mostly talus and scree. They were apparently excavated primarily by glacier action.

- South Gully: the Chief's biggest and most noticeable gully, it separates First Peak from Second Peak.
- North Gully: a dark and narrow gully near the north end of the Chief, it separates Second Peak from the "Zodiac Summit".
- North-North Gully: even darker and narrower, this gully separates the "Zodiac Summit" from Third Peak.

There is an additional smaller gully near the south end of the Chief called Bullethead Gully which somewhat separates the Bulletheads region from the rest of the Chief. This gully is very bushy and is much less dramatic than the main gullies mentioned above.

=== The Apron ===
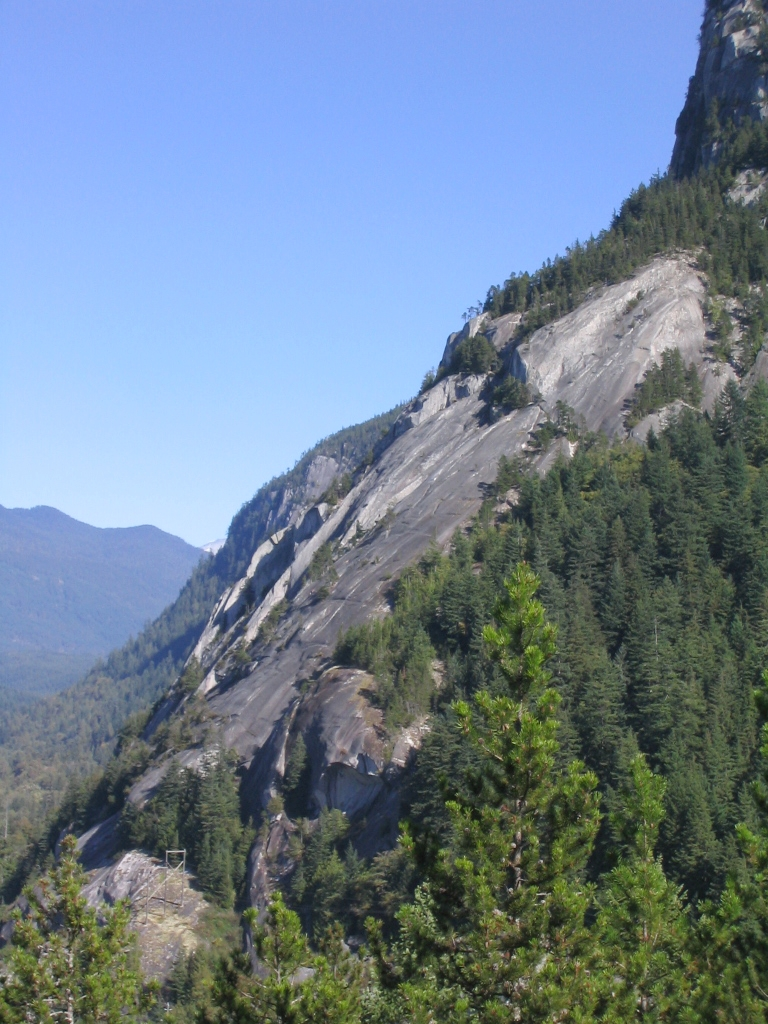
The Chief's "Apron" area, a massive sloping granite slab popular with rock climbers. This photo was taken from the "Malamute"

The Apron is a vast sweep of lower-angle rock which rises like a wedge from the highway to about halfway up the Grand Wall near the Chief's approximate centre. There it meets with a rising ridge of rock known as the Squamish Buttress, and promptly terminates in the great chasm known as the South Gully.

=== Rock faces ===
The Chief's summits are surrounded by sheer rock wall cliffs. They are typically high, exposed, and surprisingly varied in character. Several of the Chief's more notable rock faces are as follows:

- Grand Wall: the centrepiece of the Chief, this steep and pale wall rises over highway 99 just south of the Apron.
- University Wall: an iconic dihedral and chimney system to the left of the Grand Wall.
- Bulletheads: a region of oddly rounded bulges near the southern end of the Chief.
- Dihedral Wall: this featured expanse of rock is situated between the Grand Wall and Tantalus Wall. In the spring and early summer it is a nesting area for peregrine falcons.
- Tantalus Wall: the sheer face separating the contrasting features of the Dihedral Wall and the Bulletheads. Also a nesting area for peregrine falcons.
- Sheriff's Badge: a white-coloured, star-shaped exfoliation scar north-east of the Apron. Sometimes called "the Witch" or "the Bird" by local townsfolk.
- Zodiac Wall: located at the northernmost end of the Chief, this rock face is dark, isolated, and seldom visited.

The Chief's rock faces, especially the Grand Wall, exhibit the unique textural patterns which result from the process of granitic exfoliation. This is the natural means by which large, high-quality granite formations weather, erode, and age. Rather than crumbling and slowly wearing away, large flakes of granitic rock tend to shear off and drop from the face in layers. On impact with the ground below, the shattered flakes become boulders and talus.

Sometimes a flake will partially split away while remaining attached to the rock face. An excellent example of a partially detached flake on the Chief is the renowned Split Pillar on the Grand Wall. The Chief's rock faces are characterized by varied rock features including overhanging roofs, splitter cracks, rock chimneys, dihedrals, ledges, platforms, and lower angle slabs.

=== The Black Dyke ===
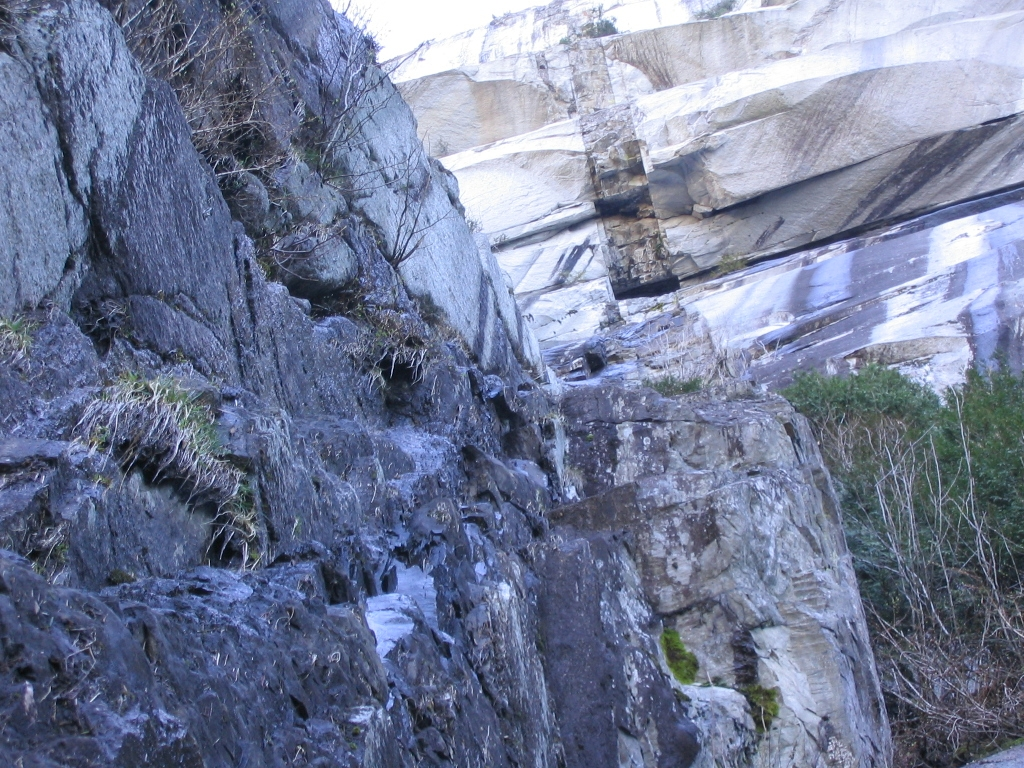
The Black Dyke as observed near the base

This feature divides the Grand Wall from the Dihedral Wall to the south. This feature is considerably younger than the pale granodiorite rock surrounding it. It formed by the splitting of the solid granodiorite along a vertical fracture, which created a conduit for basalt and andesite magmas, which may have fed volcanoes on the surface above the then-buried granitic rock. These younger magmas cooled quite quickly, which results in a very fine grained, almost glassy texture. The resulting dyke is now clearly visible from the Chief's main parking area.

=== Forest ===
At the base and around the perimeter of the Chief are thick forests. Although not exactly old growth these stands of trees are representative of pacific coastal temperate rain forest common in the area. Typical tree species are Douglas fir, Western Hemlock, western red cedar, Sitka spruce, and red alder.

=== Boulders ===
Also at the base of the Chief's walls are a variety of medium-to-large size granitic boulders. Once themselves part of the Chief, these boulders form groups which have been carefully explored by bouldering enthusiasts. Some of the boulders are so large as to seem like small cliffs in their own right. The largest is the Cacodemon Boulder at the base of the Grand Wall, an individual chunk of rock as big as a small apartment building.

== Rock climbing ==
Because of the Chief and several other high-quality climbing areas in the vicinity, Squamish has become a world-class rock climbing destination. Squamish is sometimes referred to as "Yosemite North". In terms of structure, composition, and quality of the granitic rock, the Chief reportedly resembles Half Dome in the Yosemite Valley.

Kevin McLane, longtime rock climber and Squamish guidebook author, describes climbing at the Chief thus: "immense vertical walls, long cool slabs, sinuous dykes, and beautiful cracks offer a variety of climbing that is hard to match anywhere." Almost every style of rock climbing at almost every possible skill level can be practiced here, including Traditional climbing, sport climbing, aid climbing, and bouldering. Since the Chief is practically at sea level, the only climbing styles not normally represented are alpine climbing and ice climbing.

The first ascent of The Grand Wall was made in 1961 by Ed Cooper and Jim Baldwin. Their effort was later profiled in Ivan Hughes' 2003 documentary film In the Shadow of the Chief.

Rock climber Peter Croft began what became a long and notable climbing career in Squamish in the late 1970s. He came to prominence in the climbing community by putting up a number of bold new free climbing routes on the Chief which, at the time, pushed the limits of what people thought was possible. More recently, Brad Zdanivsky became the first quadriplegic ever to reach the summit on 31 July 2005. In the summer of 2006, Sonnie Trotter established what was at the time considered to be the hardest traditional climbing route in North America, and possibly the world: Cobra Crack 5.14b (8c).

== Slacklining ==
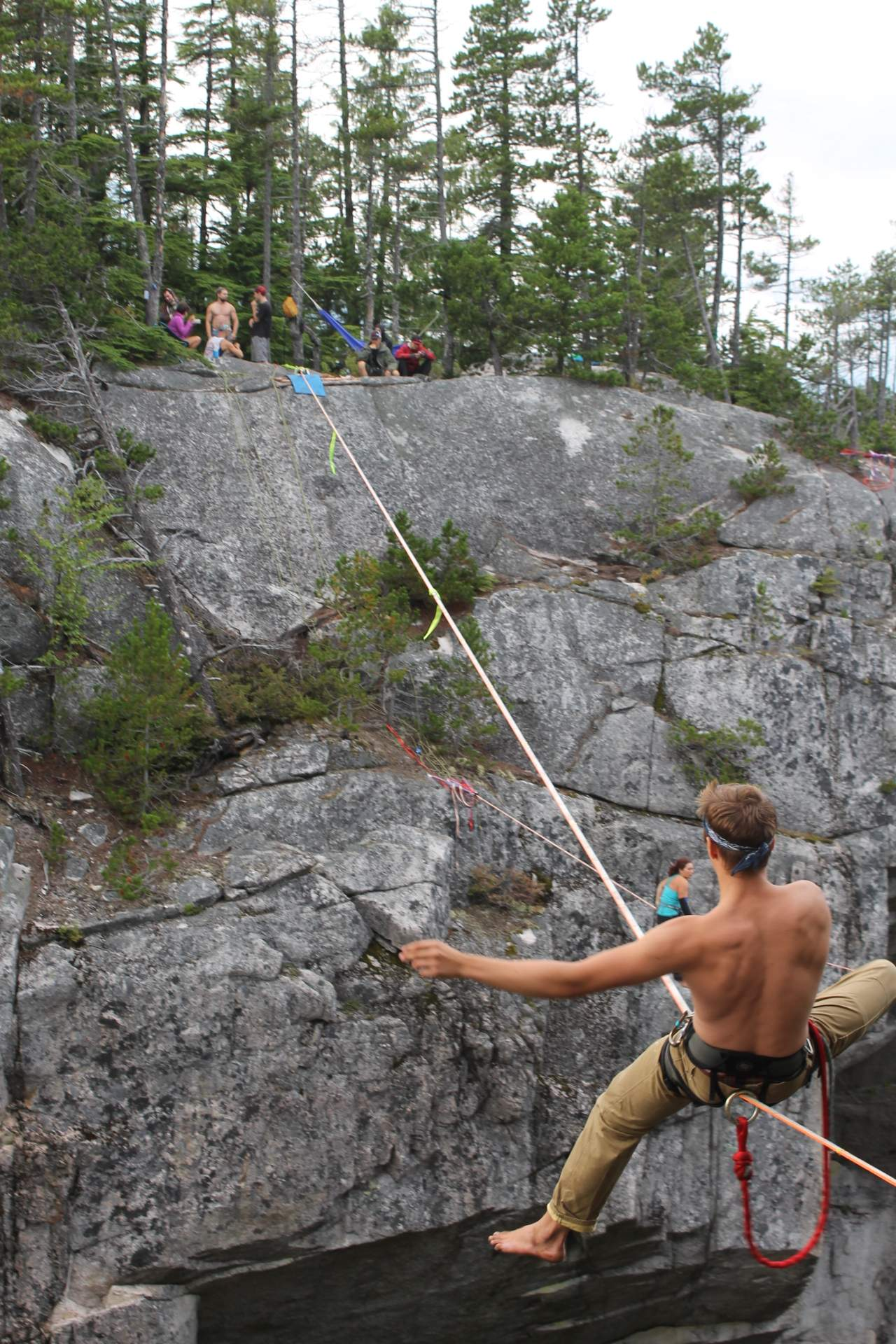
Slackliner in North Gully of the Stawamus Chief

Slacklining has found its way on to the Chief more recently than rock climbing. Slackliners set up across the gullies of the Chief. On August 2, 2015, Spencer Seabrooke broke the standing free-solo world record for walking untethered across a 64-metre gap. There are over seven different lines that slackliners use in various locations on the Chief.

== Gallery ==
Atwell Peak as viewed from the height of the North Gully.

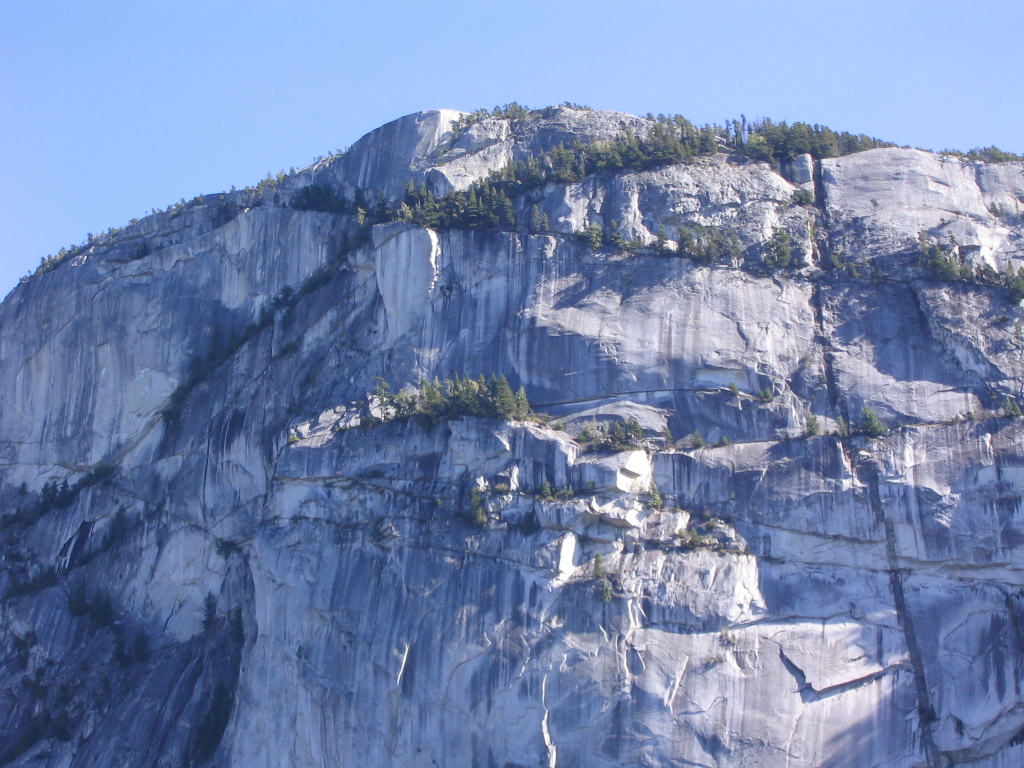
The Chief's Grand Wall area, a vertical sea of some of the world's finest granite. To the right the Black Dyke can be seen bisecting the rock face.

Unusual glacier polish features observed near Second Peak.

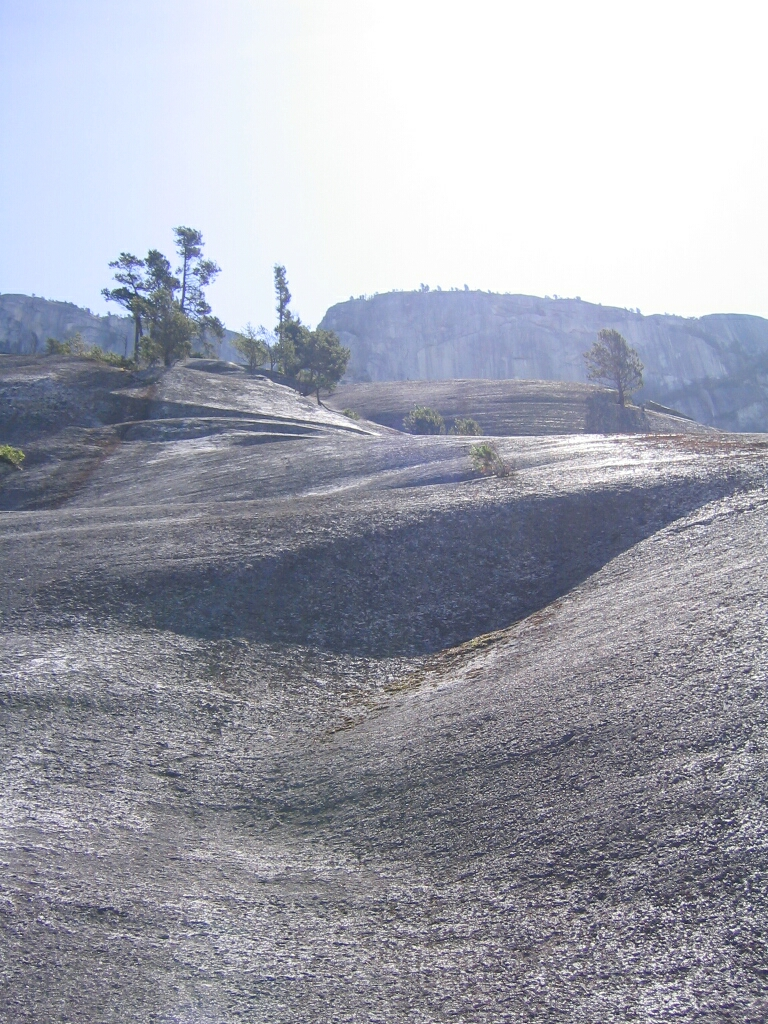
Glacier polish on the Apron's Banana Peel rock climbing route.

The Grand Wall, featuring the Split Pillar (just to the left of the tree).

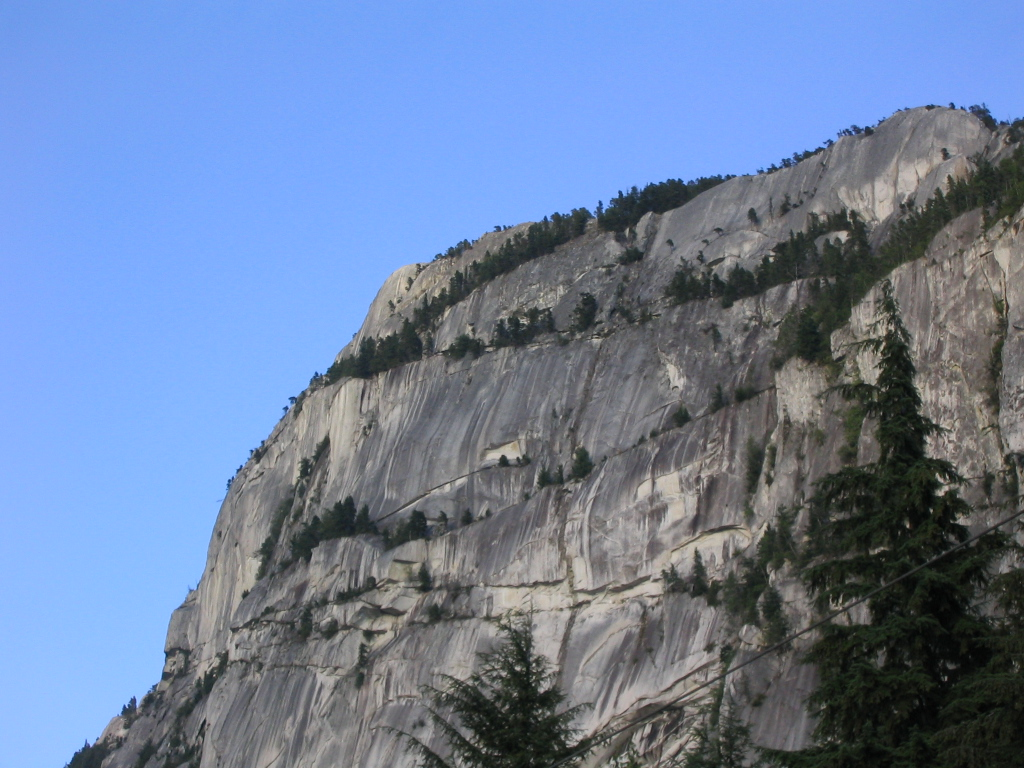
Stawamus Chief

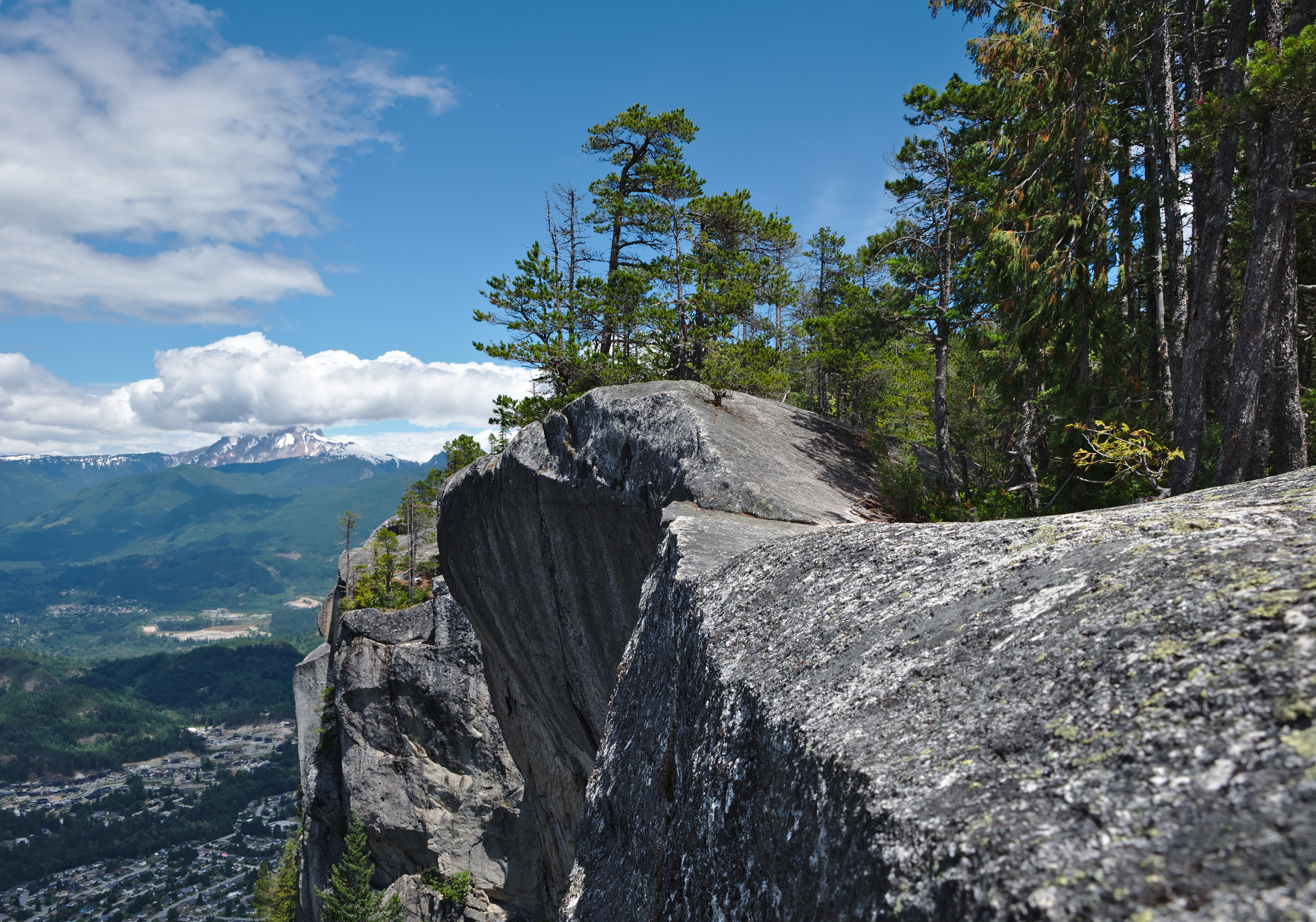
Third peak
