= Stawamus Lake =

- Location within British Columbia
- Location: North Shore Mountains, British Columbia, Canada
- Coordinates: 49°36′32″N 123°02′32″W
- Type: lake
- River sources: Stawamus River
- Primary outflows: Stawamus River

Stawamus is a lake in the North Shore Mountains of British Columbia, Canada, which forms the head of the Stawamus River.

== See also ==
- List of lakes of British Columbia
- List of rivers of British Columbia
