= Stawamus Chief Provincial Park =

Provincial park in British Columbia, Canada

- IUCN category III (natural monument or feature)
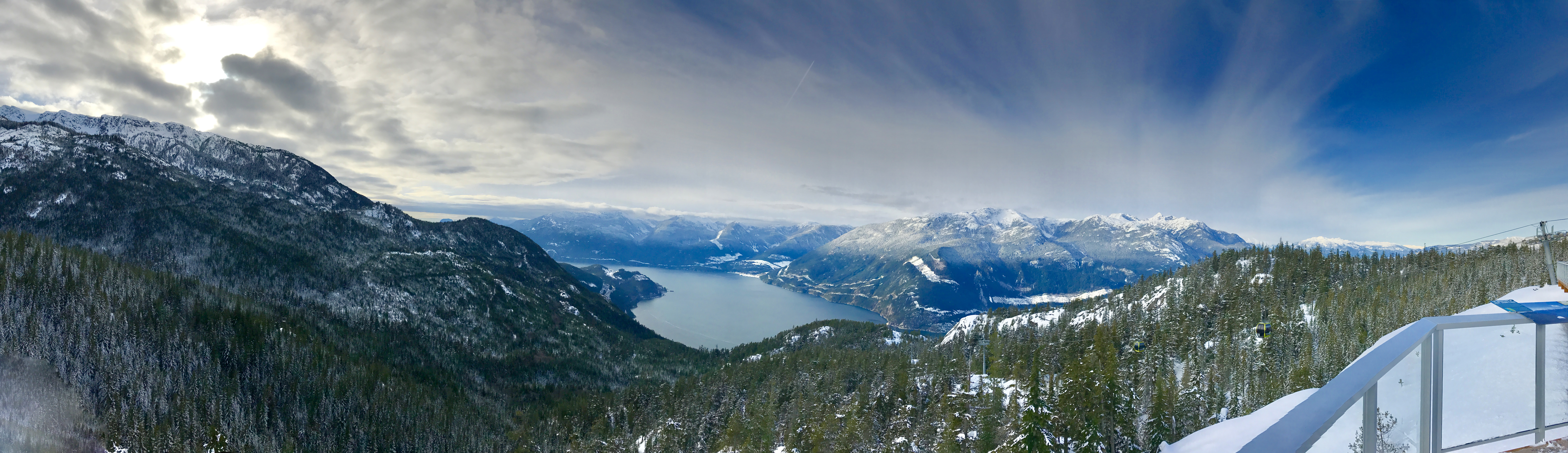
- Stawamus Chief Provincial Park; view towards Howe Sound

- Location within British Columbia
- Interactive map of Stawamus Chief Provincial Park
- Location: British Columbia, Canada
- Nearest town: Squamish
- Coordinates: 49°41′10″N 123°08′13″W
- Area: 530 hectares (1,300 acres)
- Created: July 28, 1997
- Operator: BC Parks
- Website: bcparks.ca/explore/parkpgs/stawamus/

Stawamus Chief Provincial Park is a provincial park in British Columbia, Canada, established in 1997. It encompasses both the eponymous Stawamus Chief and the Slhanay granitic domes and the surrounding forest.

Activities in the park include hiking, rock climbing, and camping. There are views from the park across Howe Sound and of Mount Garibaldi to the north. In 2009, the park received upgrades as part of the Sea to Sky Highway Improvement Project, which gave it a new signature pedestrian bridge with an unusual form that uses two blue, splayed arches and a curved concrete deck.

It is located to the south of the town of Squamish, on the Sea to Sky Highway at the top NE corner of Howe Sound.

In 2012, the B.C. government removed 2.36 hectares of land from Stawamus Chief Provincial Park through legislation, a move that garnered much public debate. This was done to enable construction of the privately operated Sea to Sky Gondola, which opened for business in 2014. The government re-designated the 20-metre-wide gondola corridor the Stawamus Chief Protected Area. The gondola had increased visitation to the park until its line was cut twice, in 2019 and 2020. A previous proposal to put a gondola on the Stawamus Chief itself was unsuccessful.
