= Slhanay =

Mountain in British Columbia, Canada

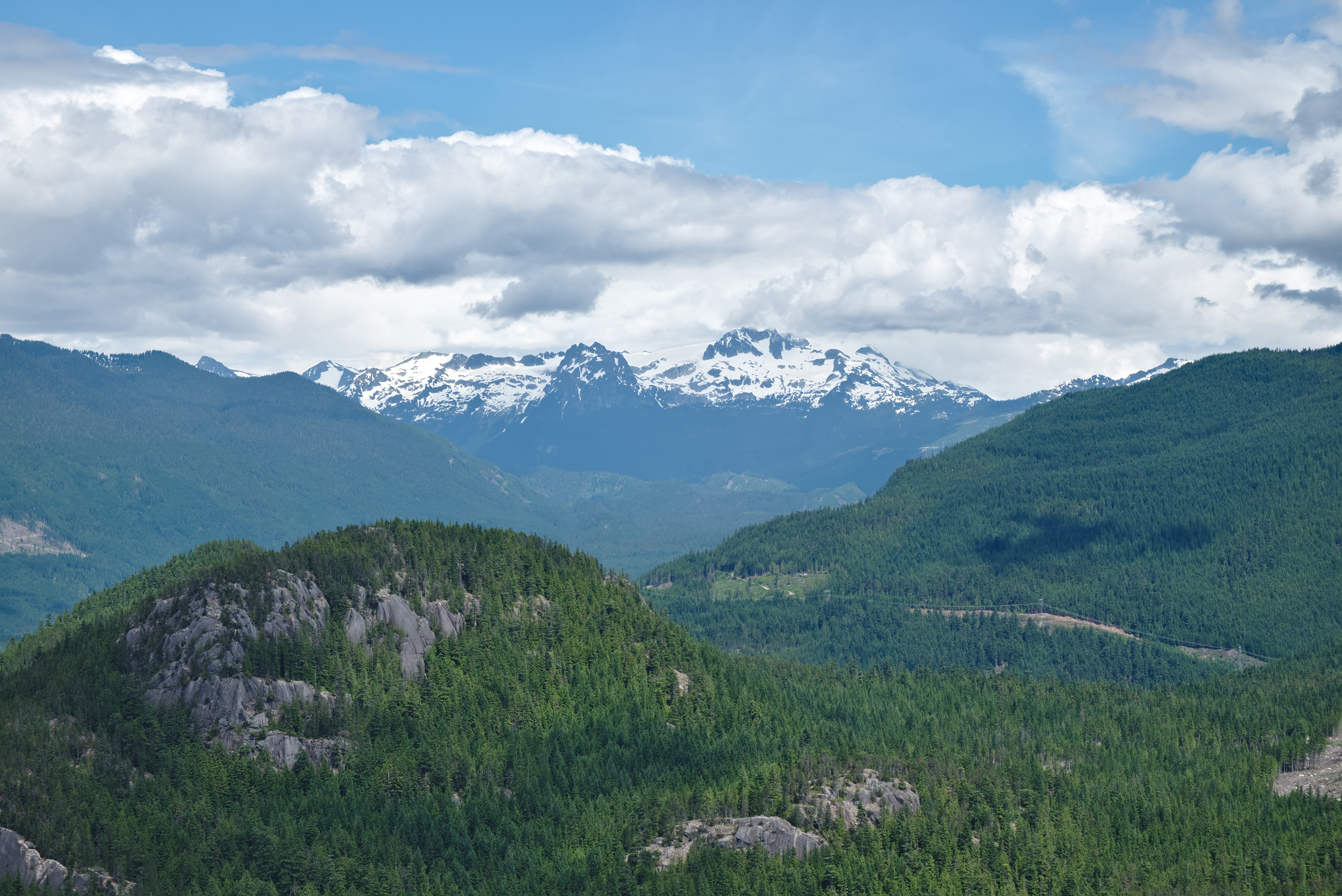
- A view from the North Summit of Stawamus Chief featuring Slhanay (closest) and Mamquam Mountain (furthest)

Highest point
- Elevation: 665 m (2,182 ft)
- Prominence: 160 m (520 ft)
- Listing: Mountains of British Columbia
- Coordinates: 49°41′44″N 123°06′57″W

Geography
- Location within British Columbia
- Location in Stawamus Chief Provincial Park
- Country: Canada
- Province: British Columbia
- District: New Westminster Land District
- Protected area: Stawamus Chief Provincial Park
- Parent range: Garibaldi Ranges
- Topo map: NTS 92G11 Squamish

Climbing
- First ascent: Prehistoric
- Easiest route: Hike

Slhanay (Squamish: [sɬa.naj]), formerly known as The Squaw is a large dome of granitic rock located adjacent to the town of Squamish, British Columbia. Although the mountain, known as Slhanay in the language of the Skwxwu7mesh people is indeed an impressive geological formation, it tends to be overshadowed by the Stawamus Chief, a much larger granitic dome located immediately southwest.

The use of the term "squaw" as a name for the dome is controversial. For a long time, no alternative had been successfully applied, probably due in large part to local tradition and an inability to get such an alternative name to "stick". This was remedied in 2009 when the new name Slhanay was adopted for the area after consultation with local First Nations.

The Slhanay is situated within the boundaries of the Stawamus Chief Provincial Park. A partially maintained hiking trail, accessible from the Chief's main "backside" trail, leads to the Slhanay summit area. This trail is rugged and the Slhanay summit area is rarely visited. However, the sheer rock walls on Slhanay's west face are appreciated by rock climbers who access them from the nearby Mamquam Forest Service Road.
