= Bowen Island =

Bowen Island: Nex̱wlélex̱m (Squamish); c̓əw̓c̓əw̓ʔiqən̓ (Halkomelem)
- Island municipality
- Bowen Island Municipality
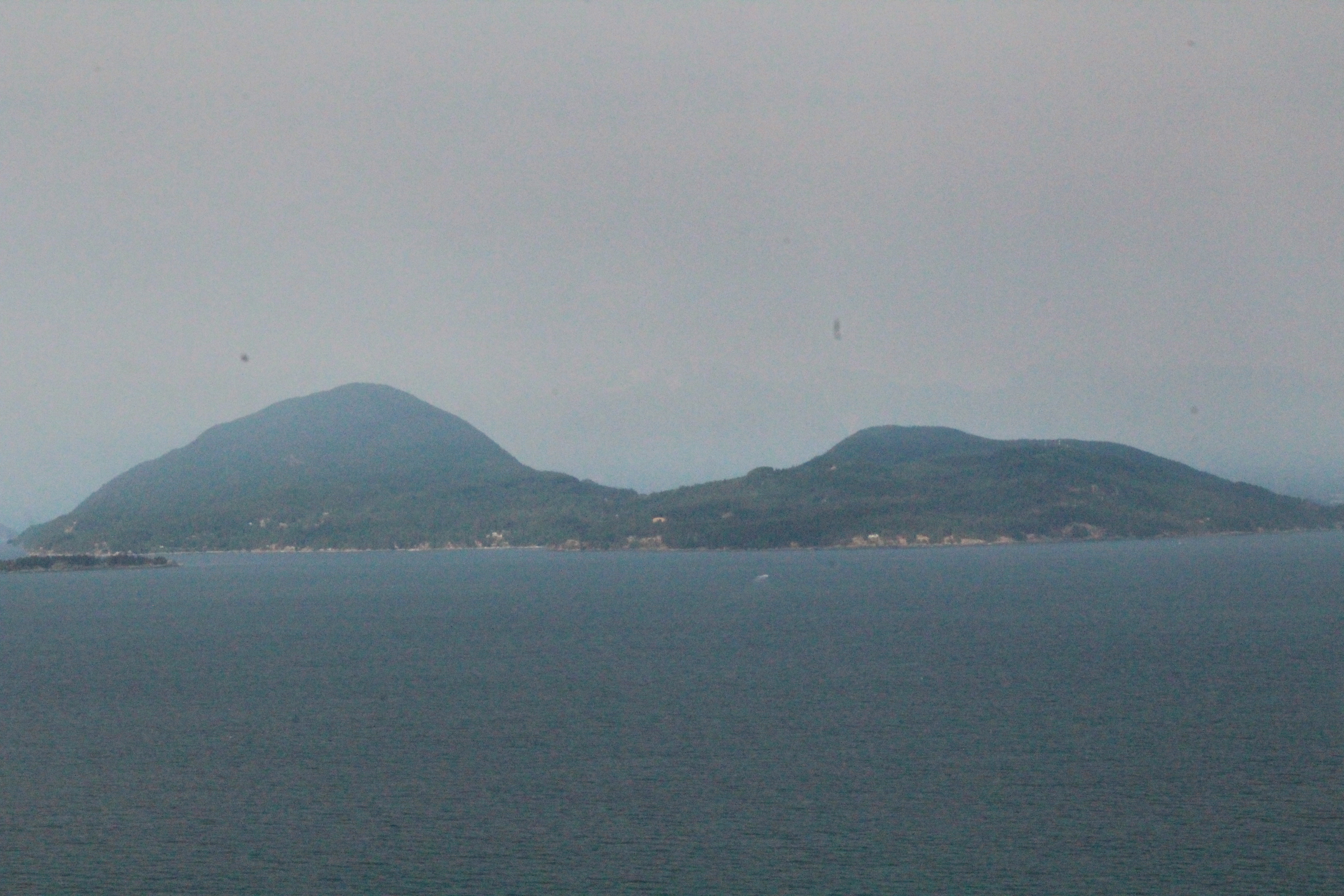
- Bowen Island from the ferry

- Location of Bowen Island in Metro Vancouver
- Coordinates (Snug Cove): 49°23′N 123°23′W
- Country: Canada
- Province: British Columbia
- Regional district: Metro Vancouver
- Incorporated: December 4, 1999
- Named for: James Bowen
- Seat: Bowen Island Municipal Hall

Government
  - Type: Mayor-council government
  - Body: Bowen Island Municipal Council
  - Mayor: Andrew Leonard
  - Councillors: List: Sue Ellen Fast; Judith Gedye; Alex Jurgensen; Alison Morse; John Saunders; Tim Wake
  - MP: Patrick Weiler (Liberal)
  - MLA: Jeremy Valeriote (Green)

Area
  - Total: 63.60 km^{2} (24.56 sq mi)
  - Land: 50.12 km^{2} (19.35 sq mi)
  - Water: 13.10 km^{2} (5.06 sq mi)

Dimensions
  - Length: 12 km (7.5 mi)
  - Width: 6 km (3.7 mi)
- Highest elevation (Mount Gardner): 727 m (2,385 ft)
- Lowest elevation: 0 m (0 ft)

Population (2021)
  - Total: 4,256
  - Estimate (2023): 4,181
  - Density: 84.9/km^{2} (220/sq mi)
- Demonym: Bowen Islander
- Time zone: UTC−07:00 (BC Pacific Time)
- Postal codes: V0N 1G0; V0N 1G1; V0N 1G2
- Area codes: 604, 778, 236, 672
- Website: www.bowenislandmunicipality.ca

Bowen Island (Squamish: Nex̱wlélex̱wm; Squamish pronunciation: [nəχʷˈlələχʷm], Halkomelem: c̓əw̓c̓əw̓ʔiqən̓), British Columbia, is an island municipality that is part of Metro Vancouver, and within the jurisdiction of the Islands Trust. Located in Howe Sound, it is approximately 6 kilometres (3.7 mi) wide by 12 kilometres (7.5 mi) long, and at its closest point is about 3 kilometres (1.9 mi) west of the mainland. There is regular ferry service from Horseshoe Bay provided by BC Ferries, and semi-regular water taxi services. The population of 4,256 is supplemented in the summer by about 1,500 visitors. It has a land area of 50.12 km^{2} (19.35 sq mi).

== History ==
=== Indigenous peoples ===
The name for Bowen Island is Nex̱wlélex̱wm in the Squamish language of the Squamish people. The Squamish peoples used and occupied the area around Howe Sound including Bowen Island. Areas such as Snug Cove and a few other parts of the island were used as campsites for hunting and gathering trips.

Historically they would use the warmer spring and summer months to travel to resource gathering sites and move from their permanent winter villages. Bowen Island has a traditional name in the Squamish language, Xwlíl’xhwm, translating to "Fast Drumming Ground", although some authors attribute the name to the sound made by the ocean as it passes through the tiny pass between the island's northern point and Finisterre Island. The tide rushing in and out is reminiscent of the sound of drums beating quickly. The name "Kwém̓shem" is used for Hood Point. Bowen is still used by people from Squamish and Musqueam for deer hunting.

Into the 20th century Bowen Island was actively used by Squamish people for deer and duck hunting, fishing and, later, wage jobs. In conversations with Vancouver archivist Major Matthews in the 1950s, August Jack Khatsahlano recalled knowing several Squamish who worked for whalers on the island at the turn of the 20th century. He also recalled deer hunting on Bowen, saying that at one time he took the biggest deer in British Columbia from the island, weighing in at 195 pounds (88 kg).

=== Post-colonization ===
When Spanish explorers arrived on the west coast of Canada, they named many of the features of what is now the Strait of Georgia. Bowen Island was called Isla de Apodaca (after the Mexican town of Apodaca, in northeast Nuevo León state, which was itself named after a benevolent bishop, Salvador de Apodaca y Loreto) by the Spanish Captain José María Narváez in July 1791. In 1860 Cpt. George Henry Richards renamed the island after Rear Admiral James Bowen, master of HMS Queen Charlotte. In 1871, homesteaders began to build houses and started a brickworks, which supplied bricks to the expanding city of Vancouver. Over the years, local industry has included an explosives factory, logging, mining, and milling, but there is no heavy industry on the island at present.

=== 20th century ===
In the first half of the 20th century, life on Bowen was dominated by a resort operated by the Terminal Steamship Company (1900–1920) and the Union Steamship Company (1920–1962). These companies provided steamer service to Vancouver, and the Horseshoe Bay – Bowen Island Ferry began in 1921. When the Union Steamship resort closed in the 1960s the island returned to a quiet period of slow growth. In the 1940s and 1950s, the artists' colony called Lieben was a retreat for many famous Canadian authors, artists, and intellectuals including Earle Birney, Alice Munro, Dorothy Livesay, Margaret Laurence, A.J.M. Smith, Jack Shadbolt, Eric Nicol and Malcolm Lowry, who finished his last book, October Ferry to Gabriola, there. In the 1980s, real estate pressures in Vancouver accelerated growth on Bowen and currently the local economy is largely dependent on commuters who work on the mainland in Greater Vancouver. Prior to becoming a municipality, Bowen Island was part of the Sunshine Coast Regional District, made up of small communities and municipalities.

== Commerce ==
Bowen Island is served by a number of small businesses including marinas, cafes, gift shops, grocery stores, a post office, pharmacy, restaurants, electric bike rentals, kayak rentals, garden and flower shops, and a building supply yard. Bowen Island is served by First Credit Union, and by an Exchange Network ATM operated by North Shore Credit Union. Bowen Island's commercial sector is primarily located within Snug Cove and Artisan Square. It is also served by a weekly newspaper, the Bowen Island Undercurrent.

== Transportation ==
=== Marine ===
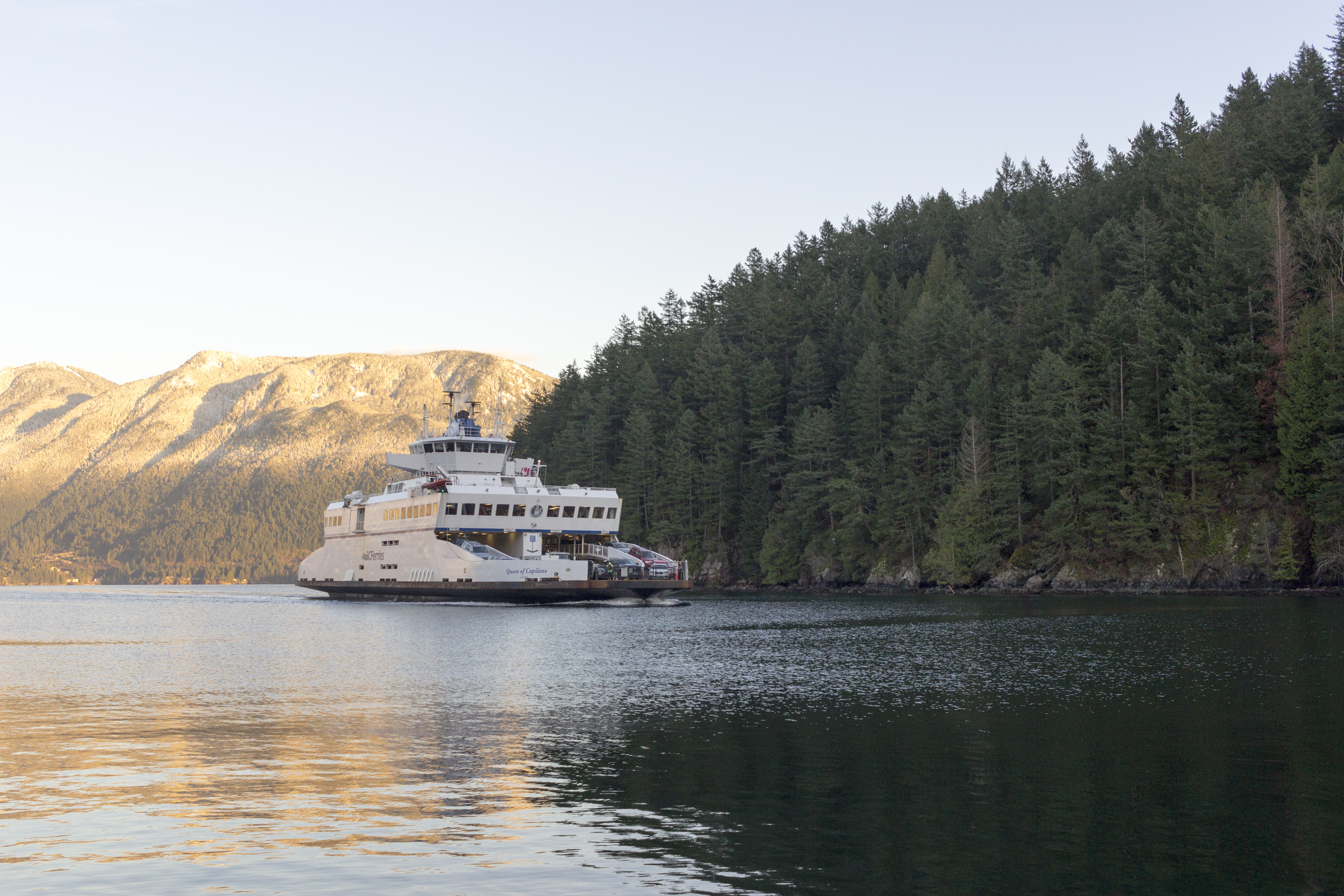
Queen of Capilano ferry approaching Snug Cove, Bowen Island, British Columbia

Bowen Island is served by three scheduled water-transportation operators:

- BC Ferries, offers a ferry service using the Queen of Capilano, which travels between Horseshoe Bay in West Vancouver and Snug Cove on Bowen Island.
- Cormorant Marine runs a passenger-only water taxi service providing on-demand sailings between the government dock in Horseshoe Bay and Snug Cove.
- Prior to 2018, English Bay Launch ran a scheduled passenger-only water taxi service between Snug Cove and Vancouver's Coal Harbour. An additional service was provided on summer weekends between Snug Cove and Granville Island. Service was suspended due to the dock used on the Vancouver side being deemed unsafe by the Parks Board.

=== Land ===
Public roads are maintained by the Bowen Island Municipality. There are roadside walking trails in only a few places and the terrain is hilly and winding. Private vehicles are the primary form of transportation and hitchhiking is commonplace.

Bowen Island has limited bus service on these TransLink bus routes, which are timed to meet some ferry sailings:

- Route 280 Bluewater/Snug Cove
- Route 281 Eagle Cliff/Snug Cove
- Route 282 Mount Gardner/Snug Cove (weekends and holidays only)

== Education ==
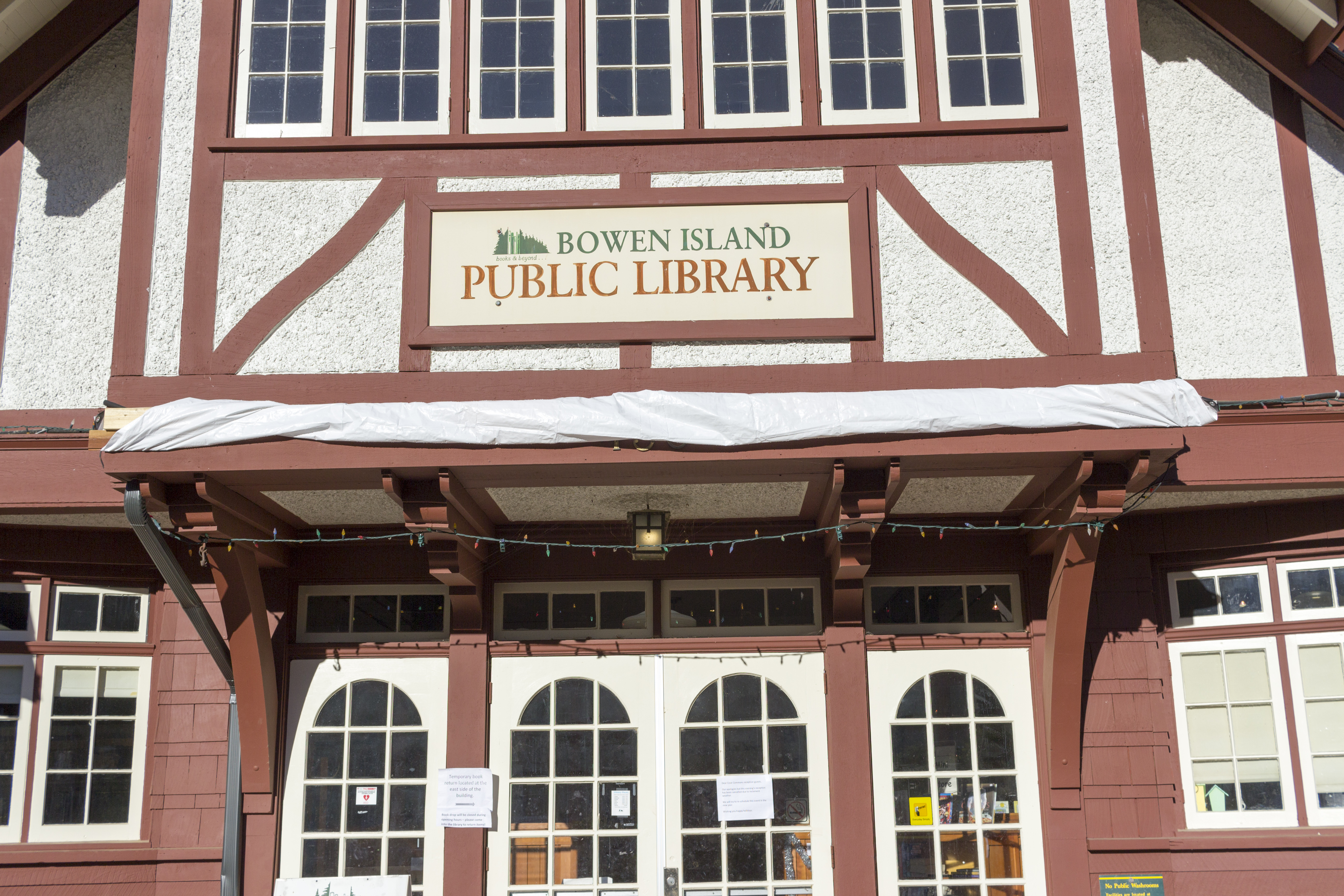
Exterior of the Bowen Island Public Library

The island is in the West Vancouver School District and has one public elementary school named Bowen Island Community School. High school students living in Bowen Island (grades 8 to 12) travel to West Vancouver to attend West Vancouver Secondary School, Sentinel Secondary School, or Rockridge. There is also the Island Pacific School, an International Baccalaureate middle school for grades 6 through 9. Some students also travel to West Vancouver to attend French Immersion at École Pauline Johnson. There is a public-supported home learning program, The Learning Centre, and a growing number of families also unschool. Bowen Island houses a public library in the heritage Old General Store that is also part of British Columbia's InterLink co-operative of public libraries.

== Places of worship ==
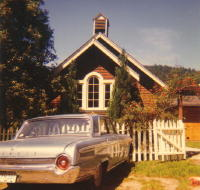
Bowen Island United Church, c. 1971

There are a number of churches on the Island. St Gerard's Catholic Church is located on Miller Road. The United Church is situated in a timber building erected in 1932 a little further along on the same road. Also on Miller Road, nearer to Snug Cove, and meeting in Bowen Court, is Bowen Island Community Church, an affiliate of the Congregational Christian Churches in Canada. Lastly, Cates Hill Chapel is a Christian Brethren church founded in 1991. Its present building on Carter Road was opened in 1999. There are also regular meetings held by Unitarians and Quakers. Bowen Island is home to the Canadian branch of L'Abri, a communal Christian retreat centre where visitors come for self-directed study. Finally, Camp Bow-Isle is a summer camp for Christian Scientists.

There are regular Buddhist meditation sittings in both the Zen and Vipassana traditions.

Bowen's Jewish community celebrates Shabbat and high holidays, and acquired a Torah in 2006.

== Demographics ==
In the 2021 Census of Population conducted by Statistics Canada, Bowen Island had a population of 4,256 living in 1,724 of its 2,036 total private dwellings, a change of 15.7% from its 2016 population of 3,680. With a land area of 50.12 km^{2} (19.35 sq mi), it had a population density of 84.9/km^{2} (219.9/sq mi) in 2021.

=== Ethnicity ===
Panethnic groups in the Island Municipality of Bowen Island (2001−2021)
Panethnic group	2021		2016		2006		2001	
Panethnic group	Pop.	%	Pop.	%	Pop.	%	Pop.	%
European (Note: Statistic includes all persons that did not make up part of a visible minority or an indigenous identity.)	3,825	90.53%	3,360	91.55%	3,045	90.63%	2,805	94.76%
East Asian (Note: Statistic includes total responses of "Chinese", "Korean", and "Japanese" under visible minority section on census.)	130	3.08%	90	2.45%	70	2.08%	75	2.53%
Indigenous	120	2.84%	70	1.91%	130	3.87%	10	0.34%
Latin American	50	1.18%	20	0.54%	10	0.3%	25	0.84%
African	30	0.71%	20	0.54%	15	0.45%	10	0.34%
South Asian	25	0.59%	55	1.5%	10	0.3%	0	0%
Southeast Asian (Note: Statistic includes total responses of "Filipino" and "Southeast Asian" under visible minority section on census.)	15	0.36%	25	0.68%	35	1.04%	30	1.01%
Middle Eastern (Note: Statistic includes total responses of "West Asian" and "Arab" under visible minority section on census.)	0	0%	10	0.27%	0	0%	0	0%
Other/multiracial (Note: Statistic includes total responses of "Visible minority, n.i.e." and "Multiple visible minorities" under visible minority section on census.)	20	0.47%	35	0.95%	50	1.49%	10	0.34%
Total responses	4,225	99.27%	3,670	99.73%	3,360	99.94%	2,960	100.1%
Total population	4,256	100%	3,680	100%	3,362	100%	2,957	100%
Note: Totals greater than 100% due to multiple origin responses.

=== Religion ===
According to the 2021 census, religious groups in Bowen Island included:

- Irreligion (2,885 persons or 68.3%)
- Christianity (1,185 persons or 28.0%)
- Buddhism (65 persons or 1.5%)
- Judaism (60 persons or 1.4%)
- Other (20 persons or 0.5%)

== Films and TV series shot entirely or partly on Bowen Island ==
- The Trap (1966)
- The Food of the Gods (1976)
- Clan of the Cave Bear (1986)
- People Across the Lake (1988)
- American Gothic (1988)
- Cousins (1989)
- Look Who's Talking (1989)
- Bird on a Wire (1990)
- The Russia House (1990)
- Another Stakeout (1993)
- Intersection (1994)
- Hideaway (1995)
- All the Winters That Have Been (1997)
- Disturbing Behavior (1998)
- Double Jeopardy (1999)
- Antitrust (2001)
- Rugged Rich and the Ona Ona (2004)
- The Fog (2005)
- Paper Moon Affair (2005)
- The Hitchhiker (2006)
- The Wicker Man (2006)
- Are We Still the Ugly American? (2008)
- River (2008)
- The Uninvited (2009)
- Harper's Island (2009)
- Virgin River (2019)
