= Horseshoe Bay ferry terminal =

Ferry terminal in British Columbia, Canada

Horseshoe Bay
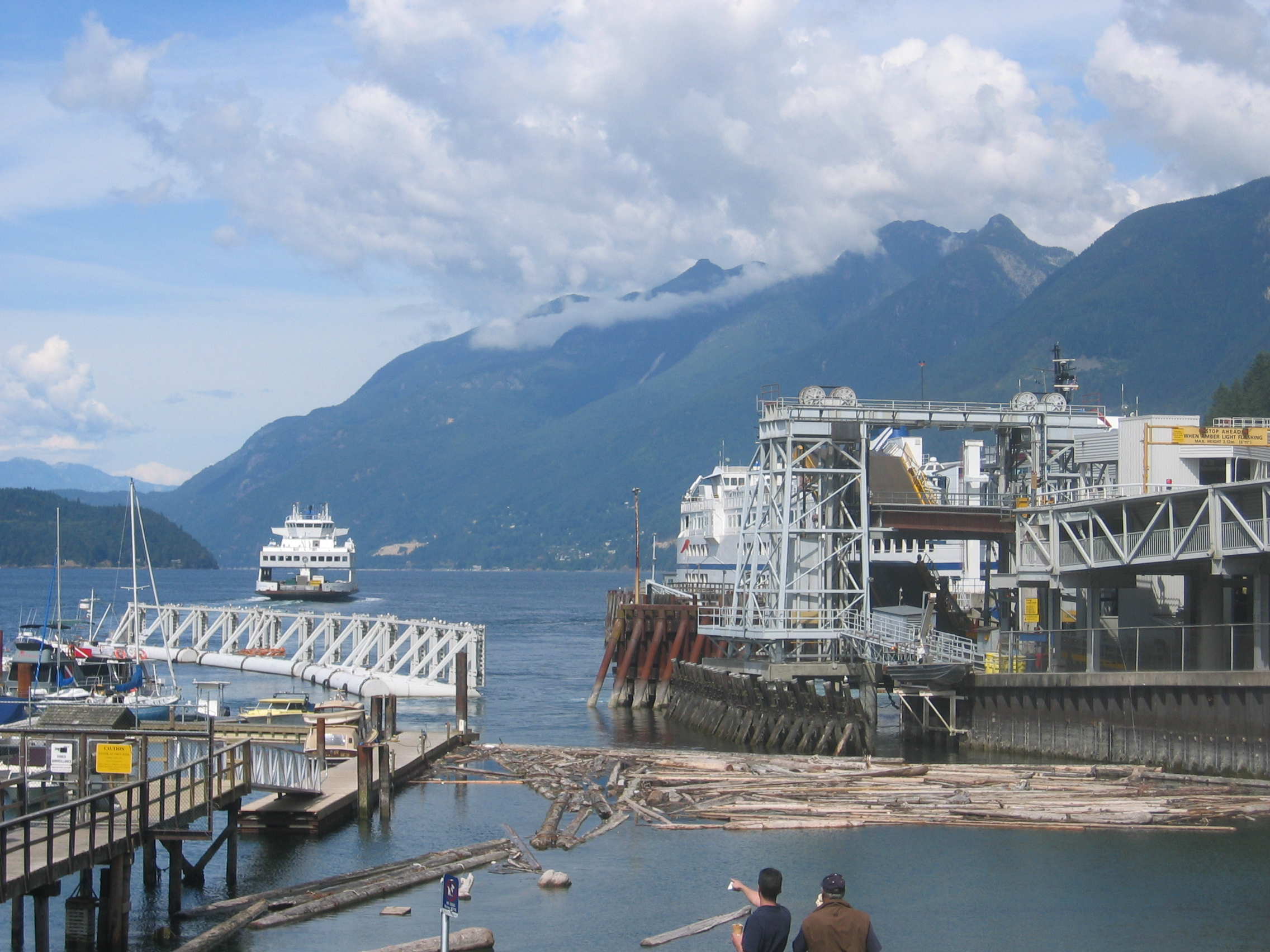
- A ferry departing the Horseshoe Bay ferry terminal.

General information
- Location: 6750 Keith Road; West Vancouver, British Columbia; Canada
- Coordinates: 49°22′35″N 123°16′16″W
- System: Ferry terminal
- Operator: BC Ferries
- Lines: Route 2–Departure Bay; Route 3–Langdale; Route 8–Snug Cove
- Bus routes: 3
- Bus stands: 1
- Bus operators: West Vancouver Municipal Transit; Coast Mountain Bus Company
- Connections: TransLink buses: 250 Vancouver; 257 Vancouver Express; 262 Lions Bay-Brunswick; 262 Caulfeild

Construction
- Parking: 138 short-term spaces; 460 long-term spaces
- Accessible: yes

Other information
- Station code: HSB
- Website: www.bcferries.com/travel-boarding/terminal-directions-parking-food/vancouver-horseshoe-bay/HSB

History
- Opened: 1951
- Original company: Black Ball Lines

Key dates
- 1961: Acquired by the Government of British Columbia

Passengers
- 2024: 3 542 240 (Note: Figures obtained for 2023 & 2024 from adding the passengers counted at Horseshoe Bay from the routes 2, 3, and 8 in each month of the calendar year. The figures under "Total Prev Year" are not used because those denote fiscal years instead of calendar years. The total passenger count at Horseshoe Bay for 2023 was 3 514 666.) ▲0.78%
Location

Horseshoe Bay is a major ferry terminal of BC Ferries in British Columbia, Canada. Located in the community of Horseshoe Bay, a neighbourhood of West Vancouver, the terminal provides a vehicle ferry link from the Lower Mainland to Vancouver Island, the Sunshine Coast, and to Bowen Island, a small island in the southern part of Howe Sound.

Comprising three berths, Horseshoe Bay is the third largest BC Ferries terminal, after Tsawwassen and Swartz Bay.

== History ==
In 1951, the Black Ball Line leased a wharf and began a service to Gibsons (later relocated to Langdale). The ferry landing at Horseshoe Bay opened on 11 August 1951, with the 48-car vessel Quillayute entering service. In 1953, a new route to Departure Bay in Nanaimo was established. In 1956, services to Bowen Island began when Black Ball replaced the Union Steamship Company of British Columbia.

In 1961, the provincial government purchased the various Black Ball operations. In the late 1960s, the terminal was reconstructed and expanded. In 1976, a new upper deck loading ramp was built.

In 2002, substantial improvements were completed at a cost of $39 million, which primarily addressed traffic awaiting embarkation on ferries. Holding stalls increased from 650 to 1,265 by absorbing former highway, removing a freeway bridge and truck runaway lane, and reconfiguring a highway interchange. Additional construction included a 450-car underground parkade and new buildings for foot passengers, amenities and maintenance. A $250 million upgrade of the terminal is planned for the 2020s.

On 28 March 2022, the first seismic sensor for British Columbia's earthquake early warning system was installed at the Horseshoe Bay terminal.

== Popular culture ==
Ferry rides from Horseshoe Bay are described by fictional characters in the novel The Cat's Table, by Booker Prize-winning author Michael Ondaatje, and in the short story What is Remembered, by Nobel Prize-winning author Alice Munro.

== Incidents and accidents ==
- 1966: Langdale Queen ran over a nearby rowboat; both occupants survived.
- 1982: Queen of Surrey rammed the dock, causing significant damage.
- 1985: Three occupants were killed when Queen of Cowichan ran over a pleasure boat near the terminal.
- 1989: A structural steel load on an arriving truck shifted, striking seven parked vehicles and injuring two women in the holding lot.
- 1990: After brakes failed, a loaded truck struck a parked van and spilled hot asphalt, killing two of the occupants and injuring others. The truck driver received an 18-month sentence, increased to five years on appeal. At a new trial, the driver was found guilty of dangerous driving but not criminal negligence.
- 1991: Robbers stole $12,000 in coin from a safe at the terminal.
- 1995: Queen of Coquitlam slammed into pilings, damaging its bow.
- 2005: Queen of Oak Bay lost control and smashed into a number of private boats at the marina in Horseshoe Bay; no fatalities were reported.
- 2019: A crew member was significantly injured after being hit by the Queen of Cowichan's bow door, which was having trouble opening at the terminal.
- 2022: A minor rock slide on 2 January closed the parkade for rock removal and structural repairs. The parkade was re-opened on 18 May 2022.
- 2025: A TransLink bus crashed into the bus stop next to the foot passenger area killing a pedestrian and injuring another.

== Gallery ==
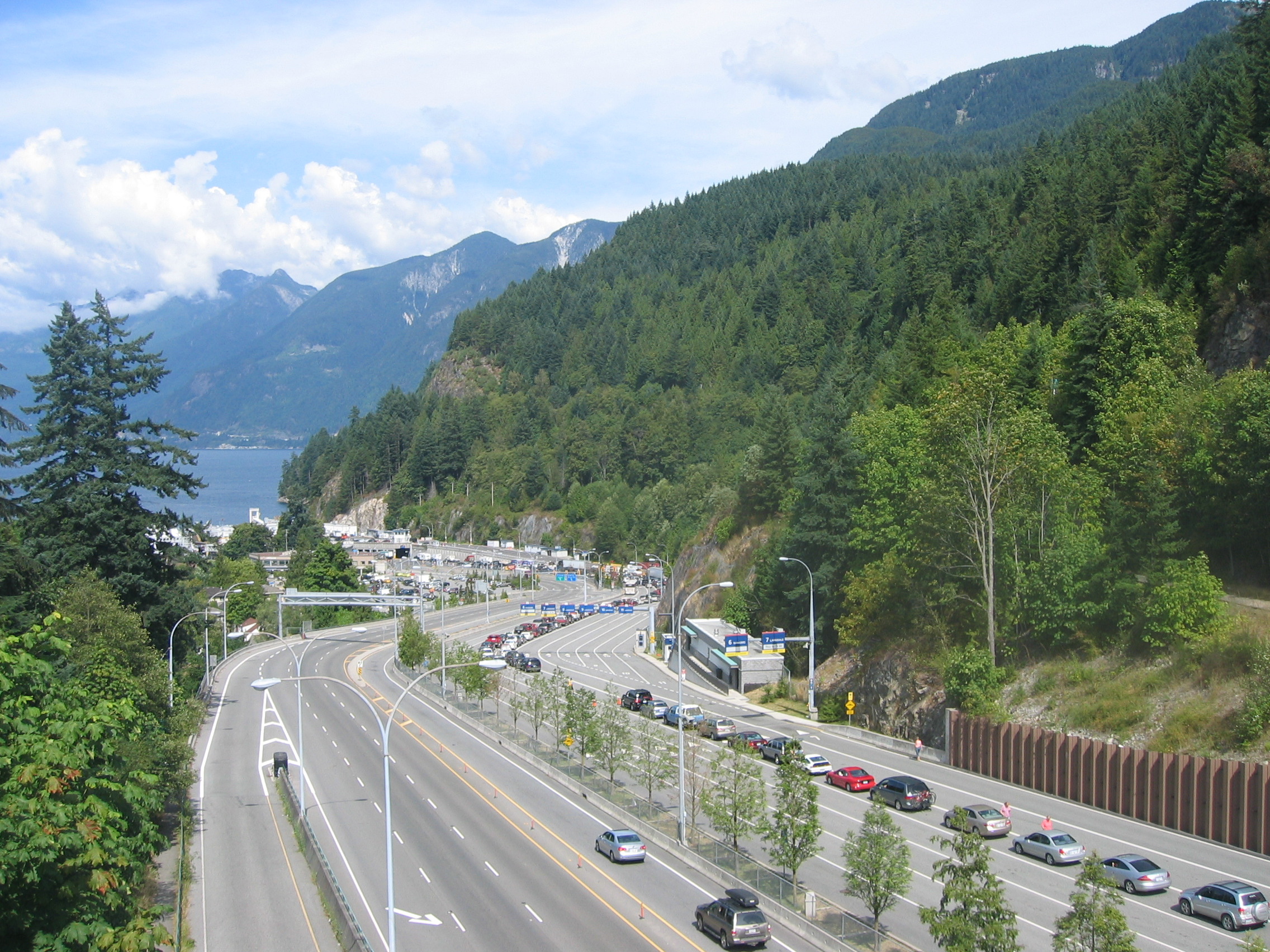
Cars lining up at the terminal.

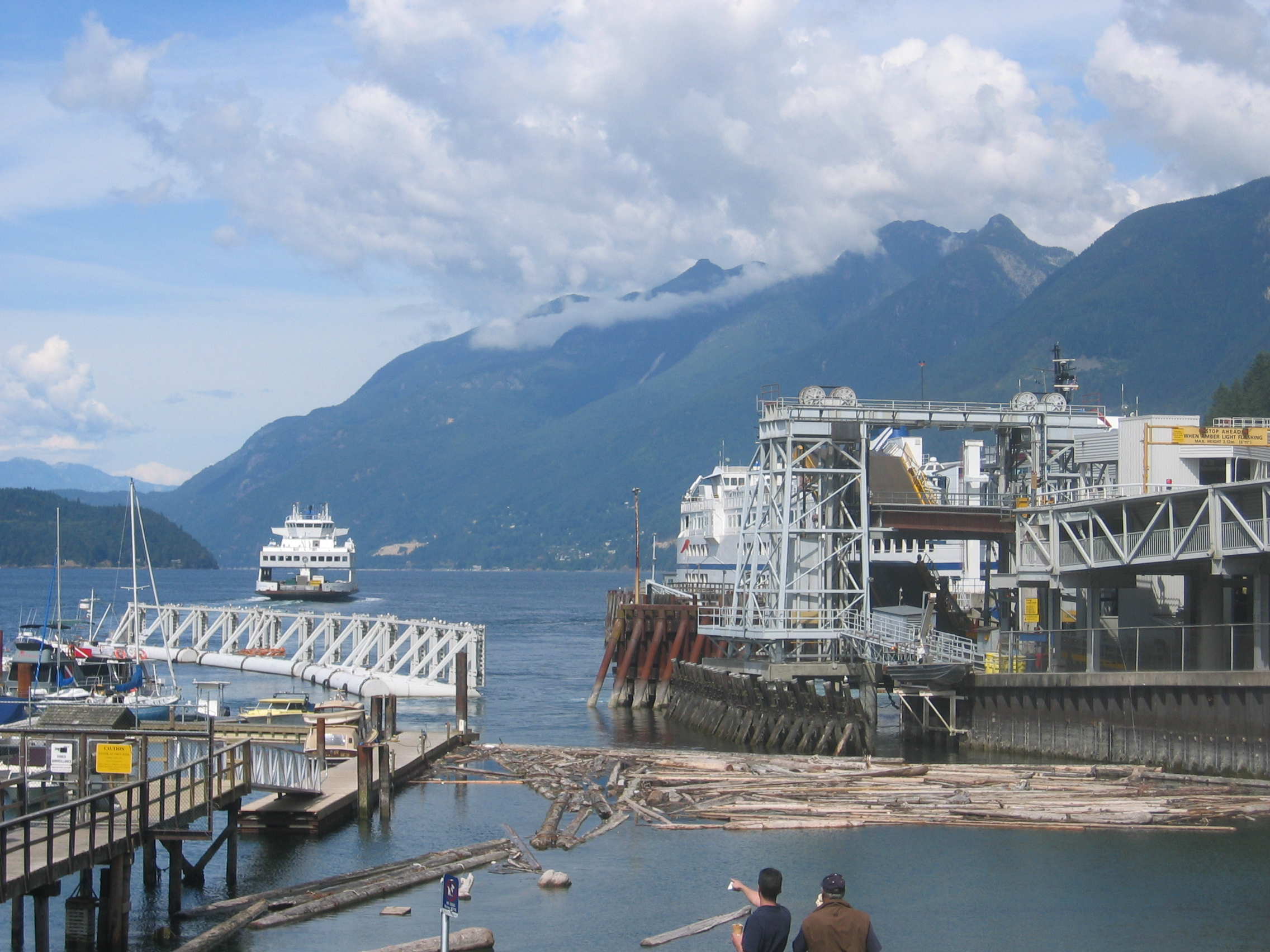
A ferry departing the terminal.

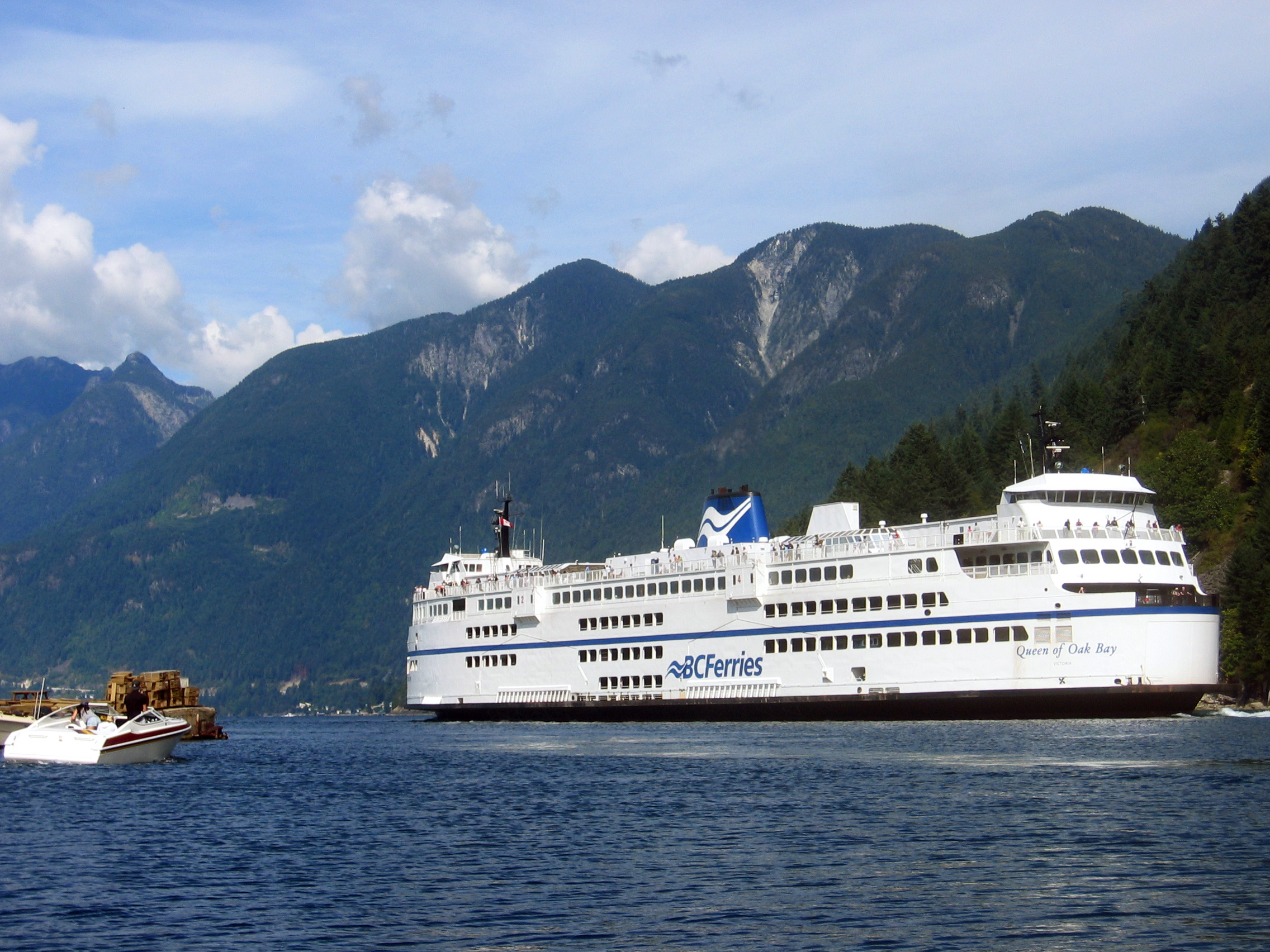
Queen of Oak Bay departing the terminal.

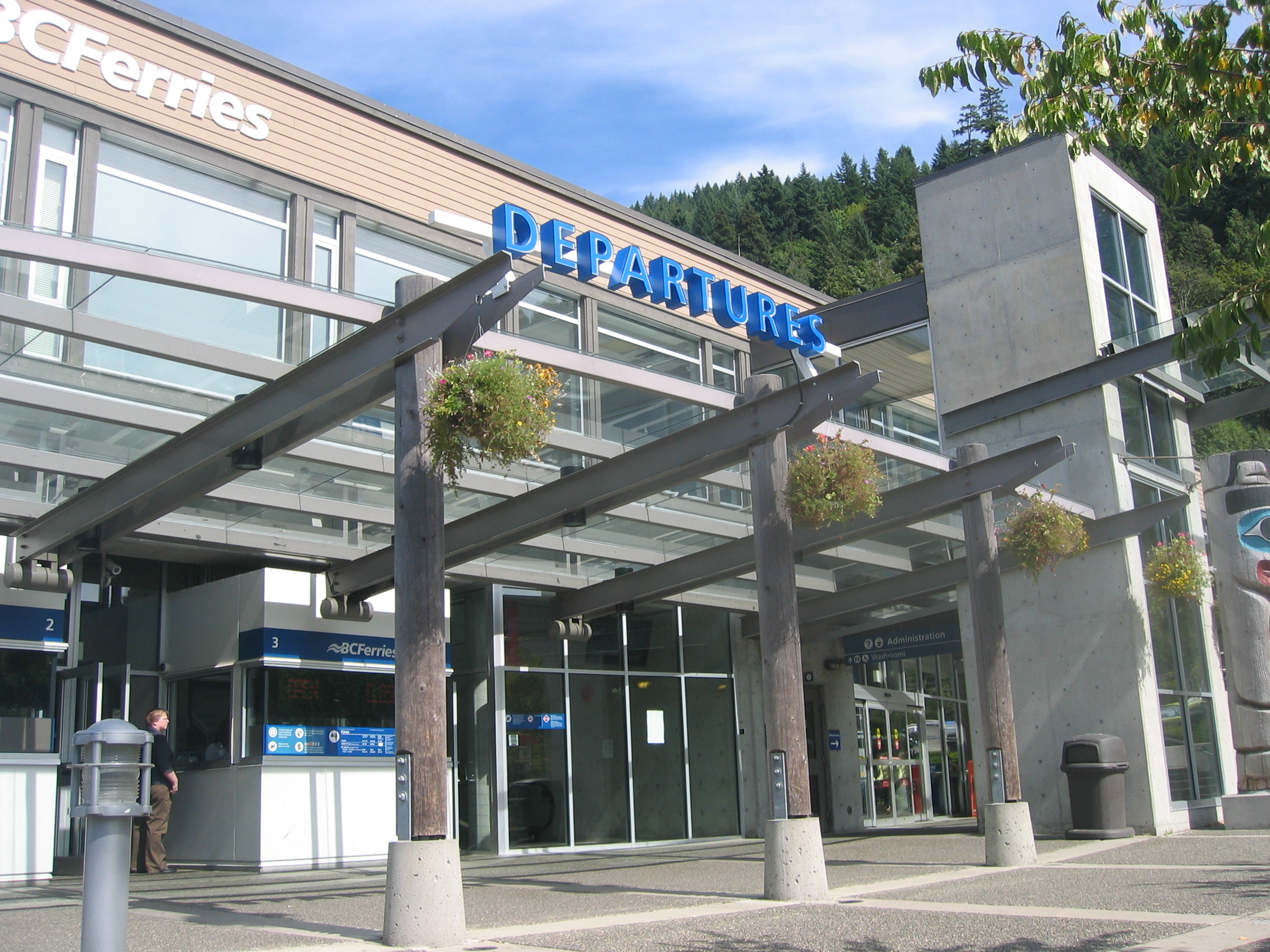
Entrance to the terminal.

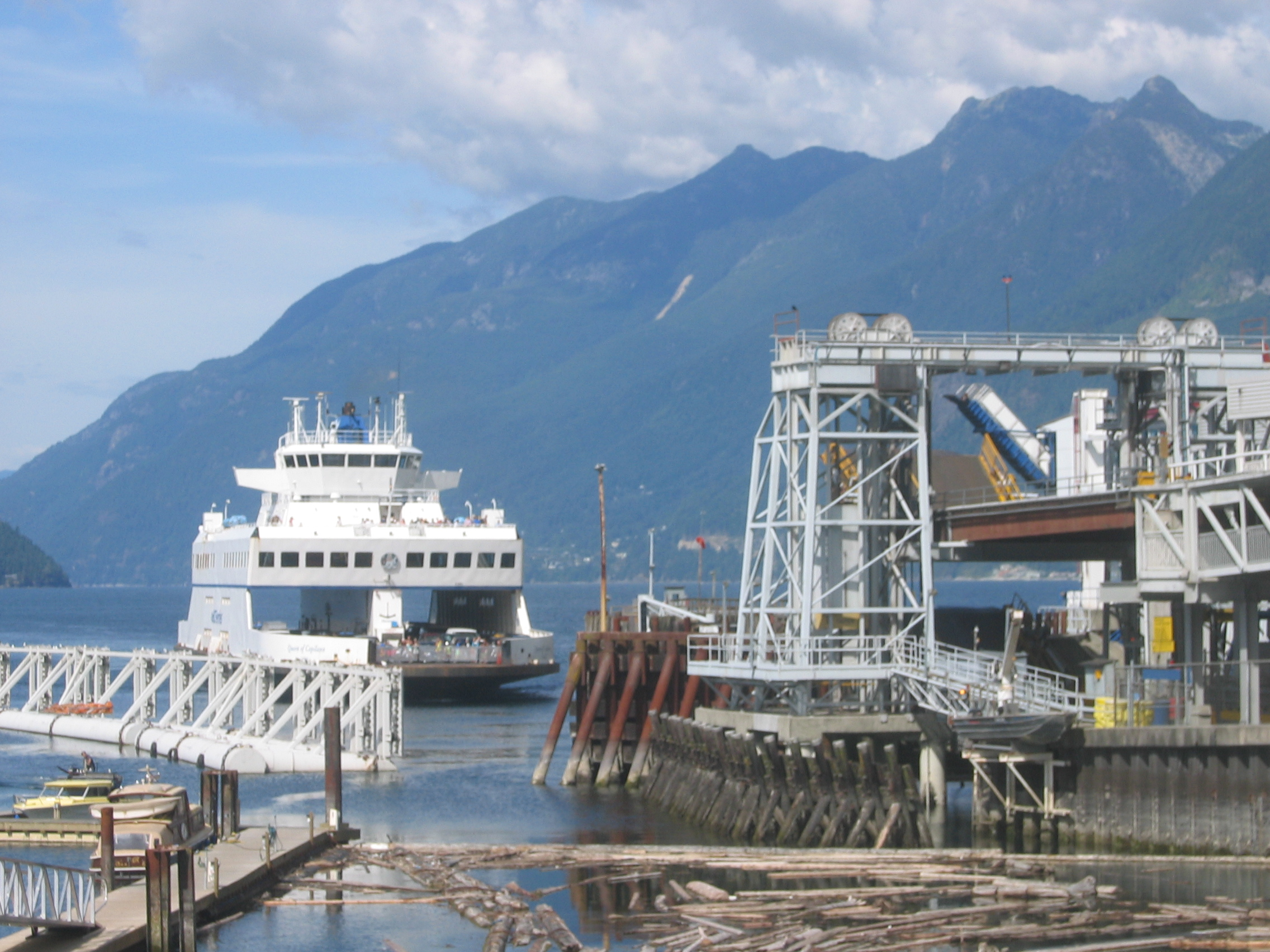
Queen of Capilano arrives at the terminal.
