= Undercurrent =

Undercurrent is a flow of water below the surface:

- In an ocean, a subsurface current, a water current which flows beneath and usually independently of surface currents.
- In a river, a subsurface current (see whitewater)

It may also refer to:

== Books ==
- Undercurrent (newspaper), a Canadian newspaper
- Undercurrent (manga), a 2004 manga series by Tetsuya Toyoda
- The Undercurrent (novel), by Robert Grant (writer)

== Film and TV ==
- The Undercurrent (1919 film), a 1919 American drama film directed by Wilfrid North
- Undercurrent (1946 film), a film directed by Vincente Minnelli, starring Katharine Hepburn
- Undercurrent, an alternate title for the 1956 Japanese film Night River
- Undercurrent (1998 film), an American–Puerto Rican neo-noir crime film
- Undercurrent, a 1999 film starring Lorenzo Lamas
- Undercurrent (2010 film), an Icelandic film, starring Gísli Örn Garðarsson
- Undercurrent: The Disappearance of Kim Wall, a 2022 HBO documentary on the Murder of Kim Wall, by Erin Lee Carr
- "Undercurrent", a 1976 episode of The Onedin Line

== Music ==
- Undercurrent (Kenny Drew album), a 1960 album by pianist Kenny Drew
- Undercurrent (Bill Evans and Jim Hall album), a 1962 album by pianist Bill Evans and guitarist Jim Hall
- Undercurrent (Sarah Jarosz album), a 2016 album by Sarah Jarosz
- Undercurrent (Matisyahu album), a 2017 album by Matisyahu
- The Undercurrent (album), a 2008 album by French band Scarve
- UnderCurrent Entertainment, a record label whom hip hop artist Abhi the Nomad is signed to, among others

== See also ==
- Undercurrents (disambiguation)
