= Bowen Island Ferry =

Ferry service in Metro Vancouver, Canada

Coordinates: 49.3846°N 123.3018°W

Bowen Island ferry
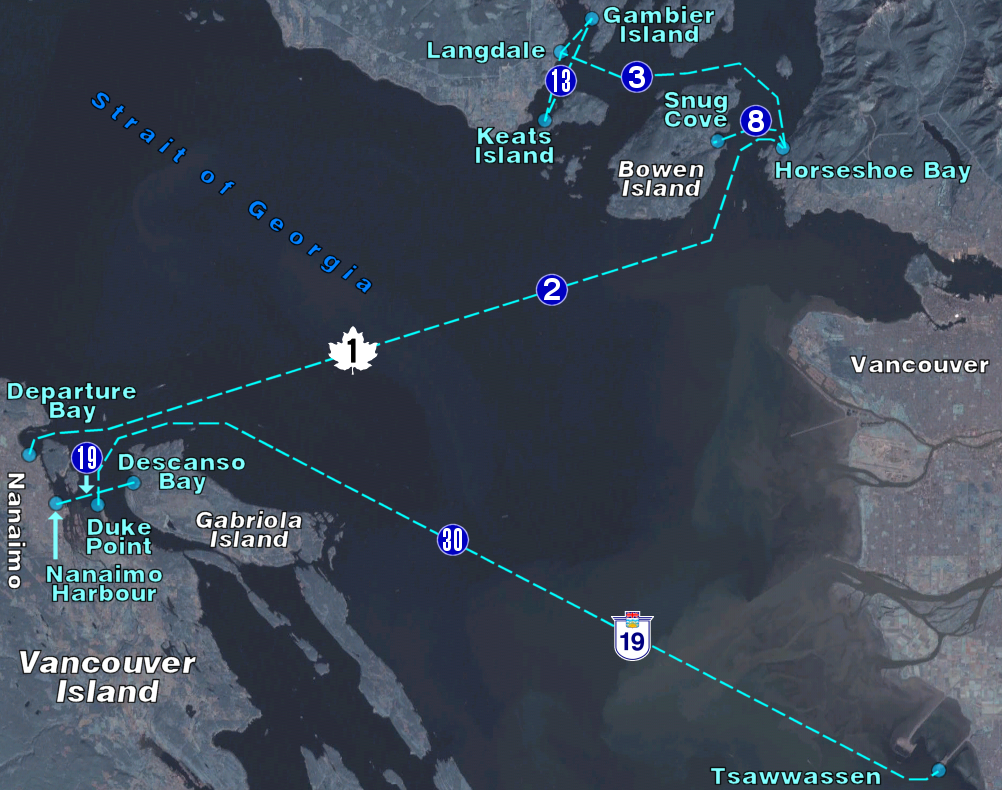
- Denoted as the route 8 in the upper-right
- Locale: Metro Vancouver
- Waterway: Queen Charlotte Channel
- Transit type: Passenger and automobile ferry
- Route: 8
- Terminals: Horseshoe Bay; Snug Cove
- Fleet: MV Queen of Capilano
- Operator: BC Ferries
- Began operation: 1921
- System length: 3 nautical miles
- No. of vessels: 1
- No. of terminals: 2
- Yearly ridership: 1 313 622 (2023)
- Yearly vehicles: 575 806 (2023)
- Connections at Horseshoe Bay
- Ship: Route 2–Departure Bay; Route 3–Langdale
- Bus: Bus connections: 250 Vancouver; 257 Vancouver Express; 262 Lions Bay-Brunswick; 262 Caulfeild
- Road: Highway 99; Highway 1
- Connections at Snug Cove
- Bus: Bus connections: 280 Blue Water; 281 Eagle Cliff; 282 Mt Gardner

The Bowen Island ferry travels between Snug Cove on Bowen Island, and Horseshoe Bay in the District of West Vancouver, British Columbia, Canada, a trip of three nautical miles across Queen Charlotte Channel. A scheduled ferry has been in operation since 1921, when Bowen Island was a popular holiday destination. Prior to that year, transportation to the island was by steamship from Vancouver, with only one trip daily. The Bowen Island ferry used a fleet of small passenger vessels until 1956, when a single car ferry began passenger service, and that ferry began carrying vehicles in 1958. In 2022 the route carried in excess of 1.2 million passengers plus 570 000 vehicles.

The Bowen Island ferry has no official or common name, and is only numbered as route 8, though this is likely only intended for internal documentation. It is currently run with the use of a single vessel, the Queen of Capilano.

== History ==
=== Sannie Transportation Company ===
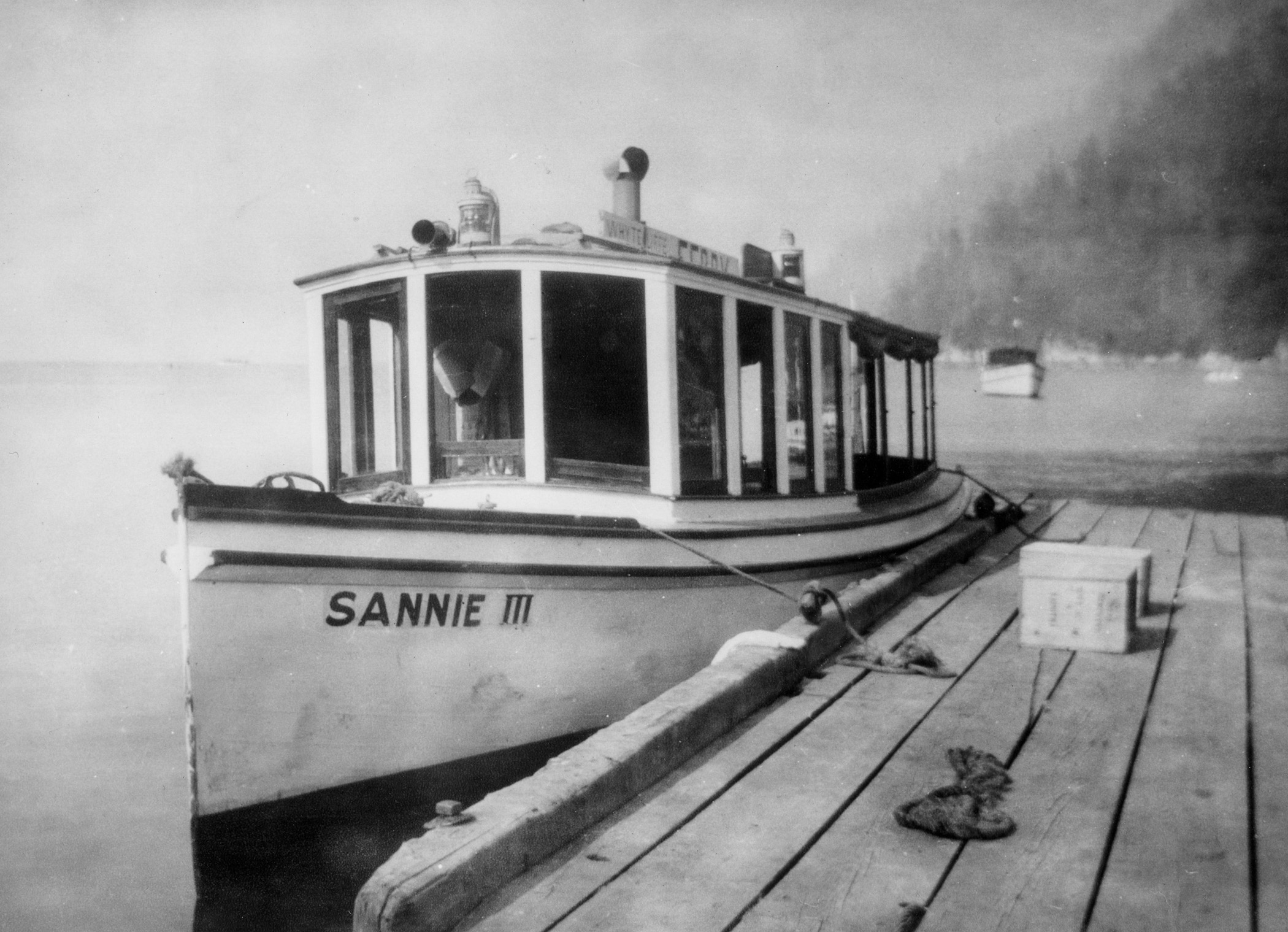
Sannie Transportation Company Bowen Island-Horseshoe Bay ferry as seen in 1922.

Initially a passenger-only route, the Bowen Island ferry was begun in 1921 by John Hilton Brown, a British shipmaster, under the name Sannie Transportation Company. He began the enterprise using his wife's yacht Sannie, named after a winning Australian race horse, plus two newly built craft, Sannie II and Sannie lll.

The company grew under the leadership of Thomas David (Tommy) White, who joined in 1921 and soon became president. He enlarged the fleet, adding the Sannie IV, Sannie V, Samina, and Thunderbird II. He expanded the market, developing a regular schedule to Hood Point, at the north end of Bowen Island. White married another ferry operator, Mary Marshall, in 1949, and they worked on the ferries until 1954.

=== Union Steamship Company ===
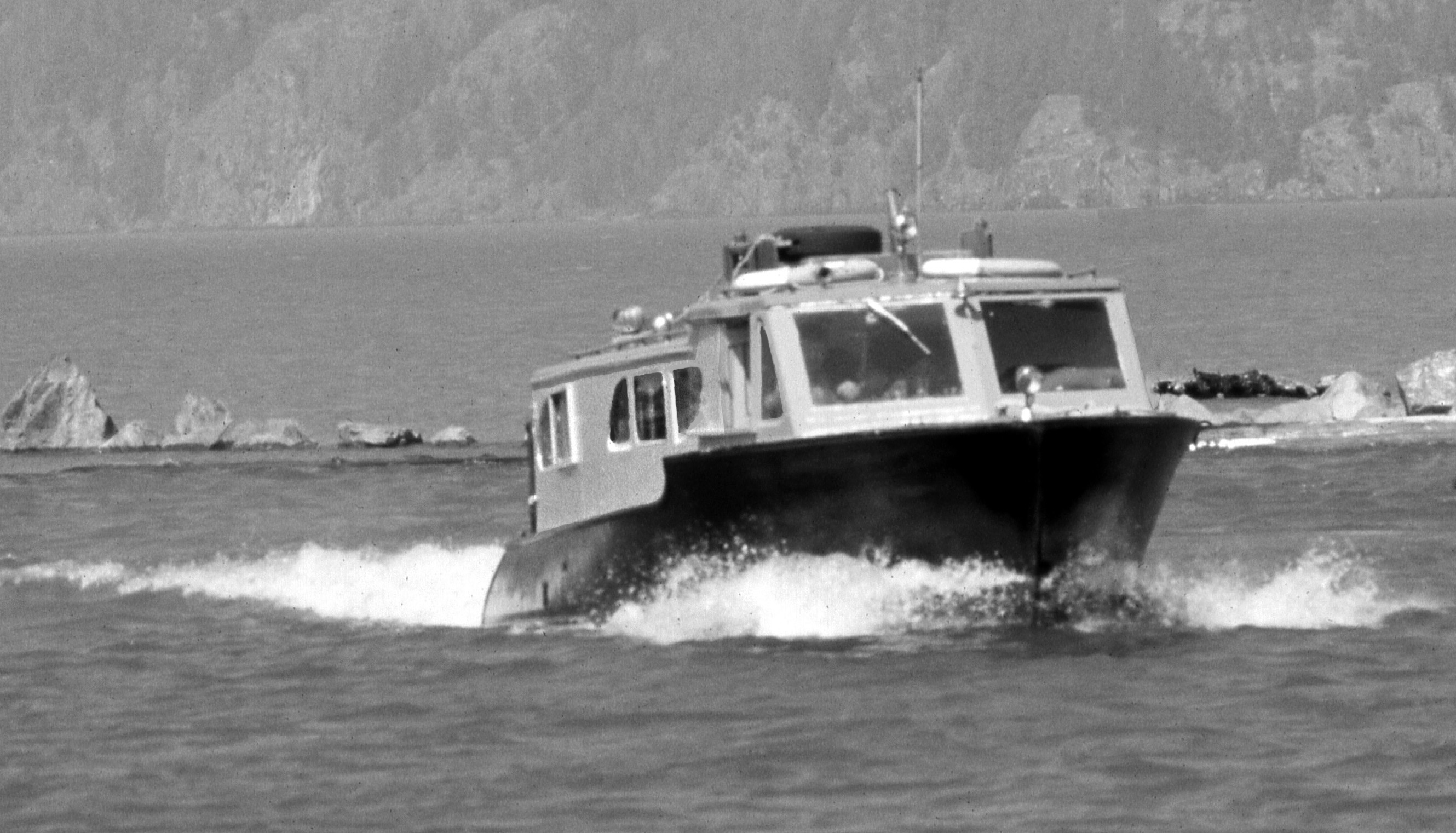
Howe Sound Ferries Ltd. used eight fast ferries, 1946-1952.

In 1938, demand for Bowen Island ferry service increased with opening of the Lions Gate Bridge between Vancouver and West Vancouver. During 1939-1941 the Union Steamship Company operated two ferries between Bowen Island and Whyte Bay (which is near Horseshoe Bay), in competition with Sannie. In 1945, Union purchased the Sannie Transportation Company and retained Tommy White as ferry manager.

Beginning in 1946, the Union Company operated eight fast ferries which used Whyte Bay as a terminus during summer months and used Horseshoe Bay in the winter. This Union subsidiary was named Howe Sound Ferries Limited, although the boats were registered to the Sannie Transportation Company. These were the Commuter, Chilco, Bowen, Chasina, Island Flyer, Island Spray, Cheam, and Cheakamus. But fuel costs were high and most vessels were sold by 1950, although Whytecliff service was maintained until 1952. The remaining Sannie Horseshoe Bay ferries had difficulty meeting demand, and Bowen Island residents petitioned for better service.

In 1956, the original 1921 fare of twenty-five cents was raised to seventy-five cents and ferry patrons, long dissatisfied, became outraged with the combination of higher fares and an inadequate schedule. The provincial government pressured the ferry company to relinquish its licence and allow the Black Ball Line, which owned a larger ferry, to take over the route.

=== Black Ball Line ===
Black Ball Line passenger service between Bowen Island and Horseshoe Bay began in December 1956 with the MV Bainbridge which began carrying vehicles upon completion of a new berth at Snug Cove in 1958. The Black Ball Line had been operating in British Columbia since 1951, when some vessels were moved north from Puget Sound after the other assets were purchased by the state of Washington. The government of British Columbia acquired the BC Black Ball ships and terminals 1961 for $6.6 million.

=== B.C. Ferries ===
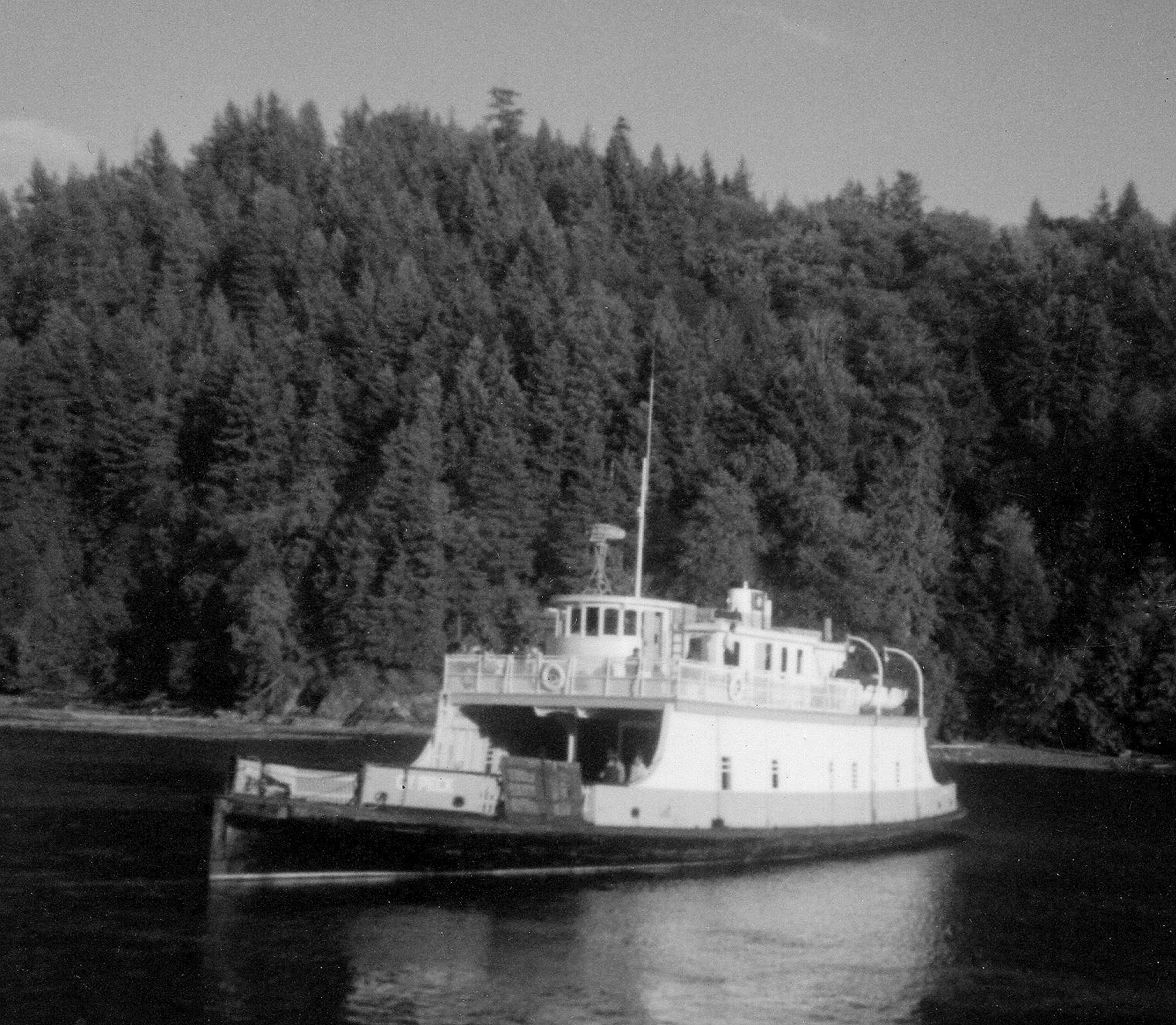
BC Ferries vessel Cy Peck at Snug Cove, Bowen Island, in 1962, after BC Ferries replaced the Black Ball Line.

Black Ball was absorbed by the BC Highways and Bridges Toll Authority Ferries, later to become the British Columbia Ferry Corporation which has served Bowen Island since that time. The ferry corporation was a crown corporation, that is, state-owned, and it retained that status until 2003 at which time it was reorganized into a private corporation, solely owned by the provincial government's BC Ferry Authority. Early BC Ferries ships on the Bowen Island route included, in 1962, the wooden-hulled Cy Peck and the original Bowen Queen (imported from Kelowna and later renamed Vesuvius Queen). A second Bowen Queen was launched in 1965, and the Howe Sound Queen was imported from eastern Canada in 1971.

== Water taxis ==
The Bowen Island ferry has been supplemented over many decades by a dozen or more Howe Sound water taxi companies providing on-demand trips and occasional scheduled shuttles. These have included PDQ Water Taxi (Ian Arthur), Mercury Water Taxi (Frank Wright), Radio Water Taxi (Bill Dunbar, Don Nemrava), Horseshoe Bay Water Taxi (Bill Jewett), Freemac Amphibious Taxis (Jack and Connie McPhillips, and Harold and Dorothy Freeston), Pete's Water Taxi (Pete Labrie), and Cormorant Marine Services (Brian Biddlecombe).
