= West Vancouver Schools =

School district in British Columbia, Canada

School District 45 West Vancouver

Location
- West Vancouver West Vancouver, Lions Bay, Bowen Island in Metro/Coast Canada
- Coordinates: 49.3343°N 123.1684°W

District information
- Superintendent: Mr Chris Kennedy
- Schools: 17
- Budget: CA$87.04 million (2020)

Students and staff
- Students: 6,583

Other information
- Website: westvancouverschools.ca

West Vancouver Schools, also known as WVS or School District 45 West Vancouver, is a school district in British Columbia. It is immediately north of Vancouver and includes the Municipality of West Vancouver, the community of Lions Bay and Bowen Island.

== Schools ==
School	Location	Grades
Bowen Island Community School	Bowen Island	K-7
Caulfeild Elementary School	West Vancouver	K-7
École Cedardale Elementary	West Vancouver	K-7
Chartwell Elementary School	West Vancouver	K-7
Cypress Park Primary School	West Vancouver	K-3
Eagle Harbour Montessori School	West Vancouver	K-5
École Pauline Johnson Elementary School	West Vancouver	K-7
Gleneagles Ch’ax̱áy̓ Elementary School	West Vancouver	K-7
Hollyburn Elementary School	West Vancouver	K-7
Irwin Park Elementary School	West Vancouver	K-7
Lions Bay Community School	Lions Bay	K-3
Ridgeview Elementary School	West Vancouver	K-7
Rockridge Secondary School	West Vancouver	8-12
Sentinel Secondary School	West Vancouver	8-12
West Bay Elementary School	West Vancouver	K-7
West Vancouver Secondary School	West Vancouver	8-12
Westcot Elementary School	West Vancouver	K-7

== See also ==
- List of school districts in British Columbia
