= West Vancouver Secondary School =

- West Vancouver Secondary School Crest

Location
- 1750 Mathers Avenue; West Vancouver, British Columbia, V7V 2G7; Canada; 49.33648°N 123.16086°W

Information
- Type: Public
- Motto: Faire Sans Dire
- Established: 1927; 1952 (present site)
- School board: School District 45 West Vancouver
- Principal: Steve Rauh
- Grades: 8, 9, 10, 11, 12
- Enrollment: 1 567 (2016-2017)
- Campus: Urban (North Campus); Urban (South Campus)
- Colours: Dark Red, Gold, White, Black
- Mascot: Hymen the Highlander
- Team name: Highlanders
- Website: westvancouverschools.ca/westvancouver-secondary/

West Vancouver Secondary School (WVSS) is a five-year secondary school located in the middle of West Vancouver, British Columbia which educates grades 8 through 12. It is one of the three public high schools in West Vancouver. The school has two campuses, a North Campus and a South Campus. Each campus has its own gym and a cafeteria. The school has 2 grass fields and a gravel baseball diamond. The main field has a running track around it. The main field is used for all sports, such as soccer, football, and rugby union.

== History ==
West Vancouver Secondary was founded as Inglewood High School in 1927, located at 1735 Inglewood Avenue. The original building was started as a storefront in which they would sell purple, black and yellow articles of clothing for Vancouver's less fortunate, but after an accident involving an angry customer the storefront was burned down.

The school opened with eight classrooms and a gymnasium. Further expansion over the years added extra classrooms and library facilities. Four more rooms were eventually added to the eastern end of the school to house home economics and shop classes.

In 1951 construction started on a new North Campus building on Mathers Avenue and by 1952 it opened as West Vancouver Secondary School. A few years later, in 1955, the building was expanded with a three-floor west wing, and in 1960 a second gymnasium was built. A further expansion added a 500-seat theatre and two music rooms in the east wing. This was followed, with some provincial funding, by a six-room shop wing referred to as the Tech Wing and located behind the north campus building. A new South Campus building was added next to the original Inglewood building to accommodate more students as the municipality grew.

The Inglewood building continued to be used for many years as a junior high school until all classes were moved to the main site on Mathers. By the late 1980s the building was used as a YMCA and the Kehilat Har-el (a Jewish Community Centre) until it was demolished in 1995.

In the mid 1990s, the school went through a major renovation which included a remodelling of the exterior and interior parts of the North Campus Building. During this time period, classes were temporarily moved to portables until the completion in the 2000s. Notable changes included a third gymnasium, the relocation of the library and the administration office, a new cafeteria, redesigned classrooms and hallways, and a new west wing. The renovations ended in 2005 when the school's new east wing and new auditorium, The Kay Meek Centre, were inaugurated.

== The Kay Meek Arts Centre ==
In 2004, the $12 million CAD performing arts centre was built in the emplacement the school's old theatre. The Kay Meek Arts Centre was the vision of West Vancouver resident Kay Meek who died in 2004. The centre features a main theatre with seating for 490 as well as a flexible black box studio theatre with seating up to 216 . The studio theatre was finished in February 2006. The first show in the theatre by WVSS was a very small show while the main theatre was still under construction. Kay's health was going downhill and so they created a small show just for her. The Kay Meek Arts Centre hosts performances from The Vancouver Recital Society, Early Music Vancouver, and The Arts Club Theatre Company as well as local community organizations like Theatre West Vancouver and Theatre K.

== International Baccalaureate program ==
WVSS is a member of the International Baccalaureate (IB) program. It is one of the three public schools on the North Shore to provide the High School program (the others being Carson Graham Secondary School and École André Piolat, both located in North Vancouver). It offers a variety of IB courses, such as Biology, Chemistry, English, Film, French, Geography, History, Japanese, Mandarin, Mathematics, Physics, Spanish, Theatre, and Visual Arts. The standard Diploma programme course, Theory of Knowledge, is required in this program.

WVSS is the only public high school in the West Vancouver School District to offer the IBO Diploma programme; however, Mulgrave School also offers the IBO Diploma. The other three secondary schools in the district, Rockridge, Sentinel and Collingwood, the latter being a private school, offer the Advanced Placement (AP) Program.

== West Vancouver athletics ==
WVSS is home to up to 42 different sports, depending on how many students for each team.

Boys

1. Football
2. Rugby
3. Basketball
4. Badminton
5. Soccer
6. Ultimate
7. Track and Field
8. Cross Country
9. Skiing/Snowboarding

Girls

1. Volleyball
2. Field Hockey
3. Basketball
4. Badminton
5. Soccer
6. Ultimate
7. Track and Field
8. Cross Country
9. Skiing/Snowboarding
