= Sentinel Secondary School =

Public secondary school in West Vancouver, British Columbia, Canada

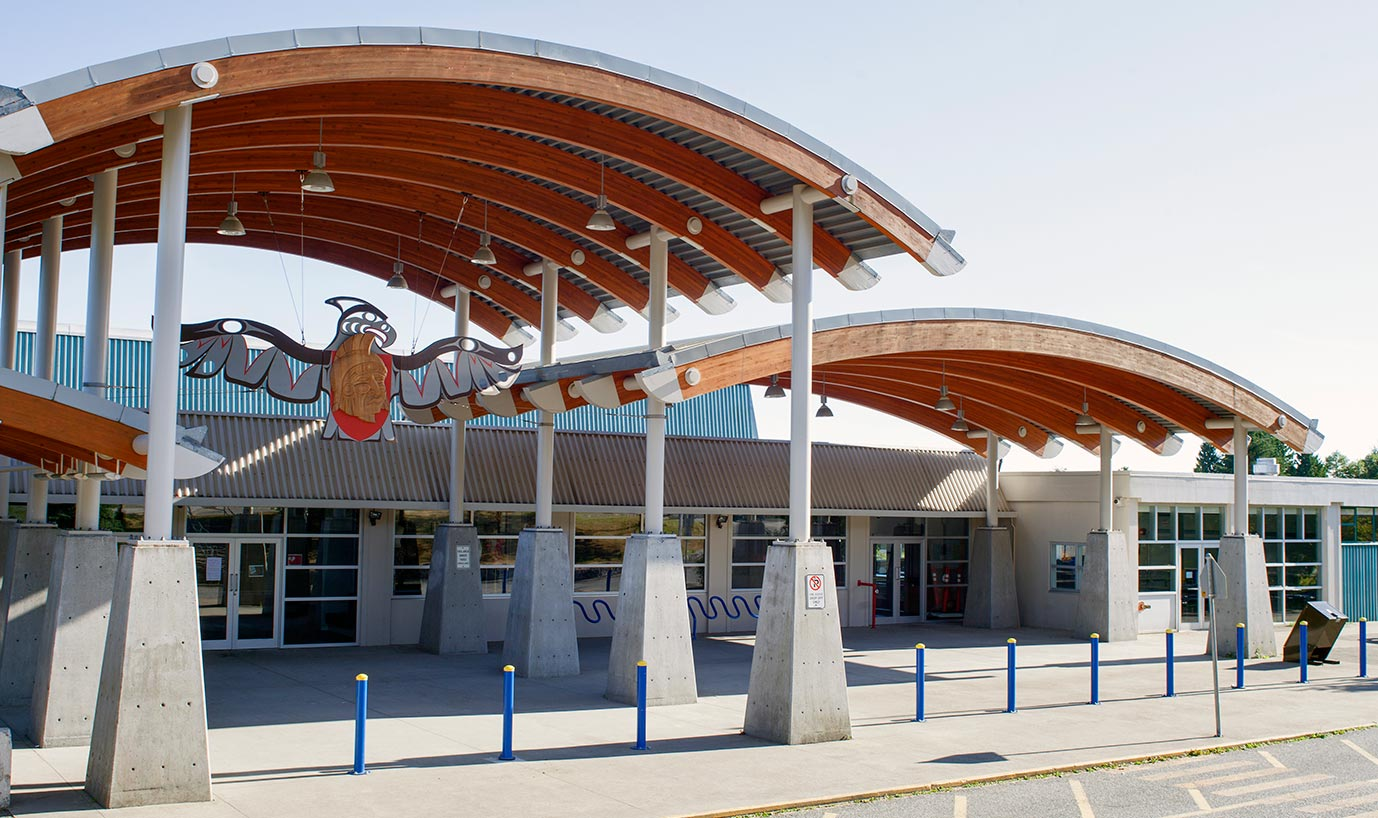

Location
- West Vancouver, British Columbia; Canada; 49.34563°N 123.15046°W

Information
- School type: Public
- Motto: Summis Cum Animis (with the greatest possible spirit)
- Founded: 1962–63 school year (building opened in 1963)
- School board: 45
- Superintendent: Chris Kennedy
- Principal: Mr. Michael Finch
- Grades: 8–12
- Enrollment: 1250
- Language: English, French immersion
- Colours: Navy and Silver
- Mascot: Sparty the Spartan
- Team name: Spartans
- Website: http://westvancouverschools.ca/ecole-sentinel-secondary/
- Last updated: 2020

École Sentinel Secondary is a secondary school located in West Vancouver, British Columbia, Canada, serving more than 1250 students in Grades 8 through 12. It is one of three public secondary schools in the West Vancouver district (SD #45) including West Vancouver Secondary School and Rockridge Secondary School.

The school has a grass field, two baseball diamonds, three street hockey courts and three tennis courts. The main field is used for some outdoor sports, such as soccer, football, baseball, and rugby. There are also two gyms and a weight room.

The school was established for the 1962–63 school year with students who had previously attended Hillside Secondary School and Inglewood Junior High School. The first classes were held in the old Inglewood School until the new building was completed in 1963. The first grade 12 graduating class was in 1965.

The school is on 1200 Chartwell Drive, sitting beside an elementary school Chartwell Elementary.

== Advanced Placement Program ==
Sentinel offers Advanced Placement (AP) courses. Pre-AP courses are offered to students wishing to prepare for the full Advanced Placement offerings in their Senior School years. Sentinel offers AP classes in French, psychology, calculus, physics, biology, chemistry, language, literature, fine arts, and many more. Students in both grade 11 and 12 are allowed to register for AP courses.

The Capstone program is a university-level AP course offered by Sentinel Secondary for English language and literature. It is a research-based program where students get the opportunity to look into a topic of their choice and create a presentation for the class. By allowing students to pick their own material, students have more freedom and are more invested and interested in their learning. The courses provide guidelines for essay writing and citations that will be needed throughout their university education.

== Athletics ==
Sentinel is also home to various premier academies which specialize in specific sports or activities including the Premier:

- Baseball Academy
- Basketball Academy
- Fencing Academy
- Field Hockey Academy
- Hockey Academy
- Mechatronics Robotics Academy
- Rugby Academy
- Soccer Academy
- Tennis Academy
- Volleyball Academy

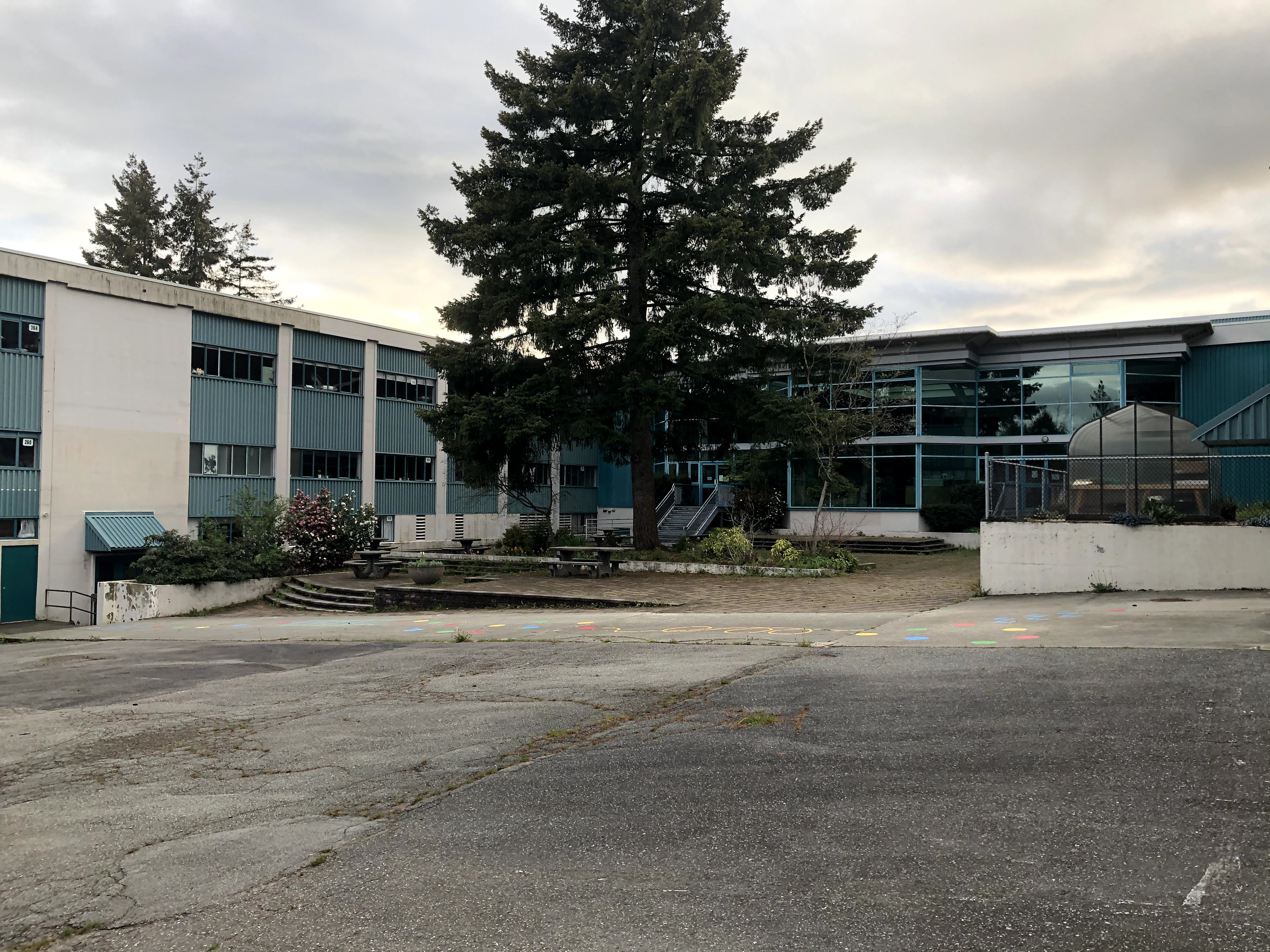
School courtyard

== Arts Programmes ==
Sentinel Library (circa 2006)

Sentinel has a diverse music programme which differentiates from that of other schools. It has a regular stage/jazz band typically for students grades 10–11, a classical orchestra which encompasses all grades, and a unique Rhythm and Blues band usually reserved for those in grades 11–12 by audition. The latter is a band that plays songs anywhere from 60s and 70s R&B, funk, and even rock. Students learn songs by ear from the original recordings rather than from sheet music. In addition to this, the band plays at various school and external events, as well as their own concert, “Jazz Café”, which is in collaboration with the jazz band. A number of videos of the Sentinel Rhythm and Blues Band are currently available on YouTube. Sentinel's theatre program, Sentinel Stage was formerly recognized as one of the best school theatre programs in the North Shore.

== French Immersion ==
Sentinel also offers French Immersion, with École Pauline Johnson and École Cedardale being the main feeder schools. Sentinel offers bilingual instruction to students enrolled in the French Immersion program. Immersion is for students who have received their primary and/or intermediate level of instruction in French. As students progress through each year, the percentage of classes in French is reduced: Grades 8 and 9 = 50%, Grade 10 = 38%, Grade 11 = 25%, Grade 12 = 12-14%

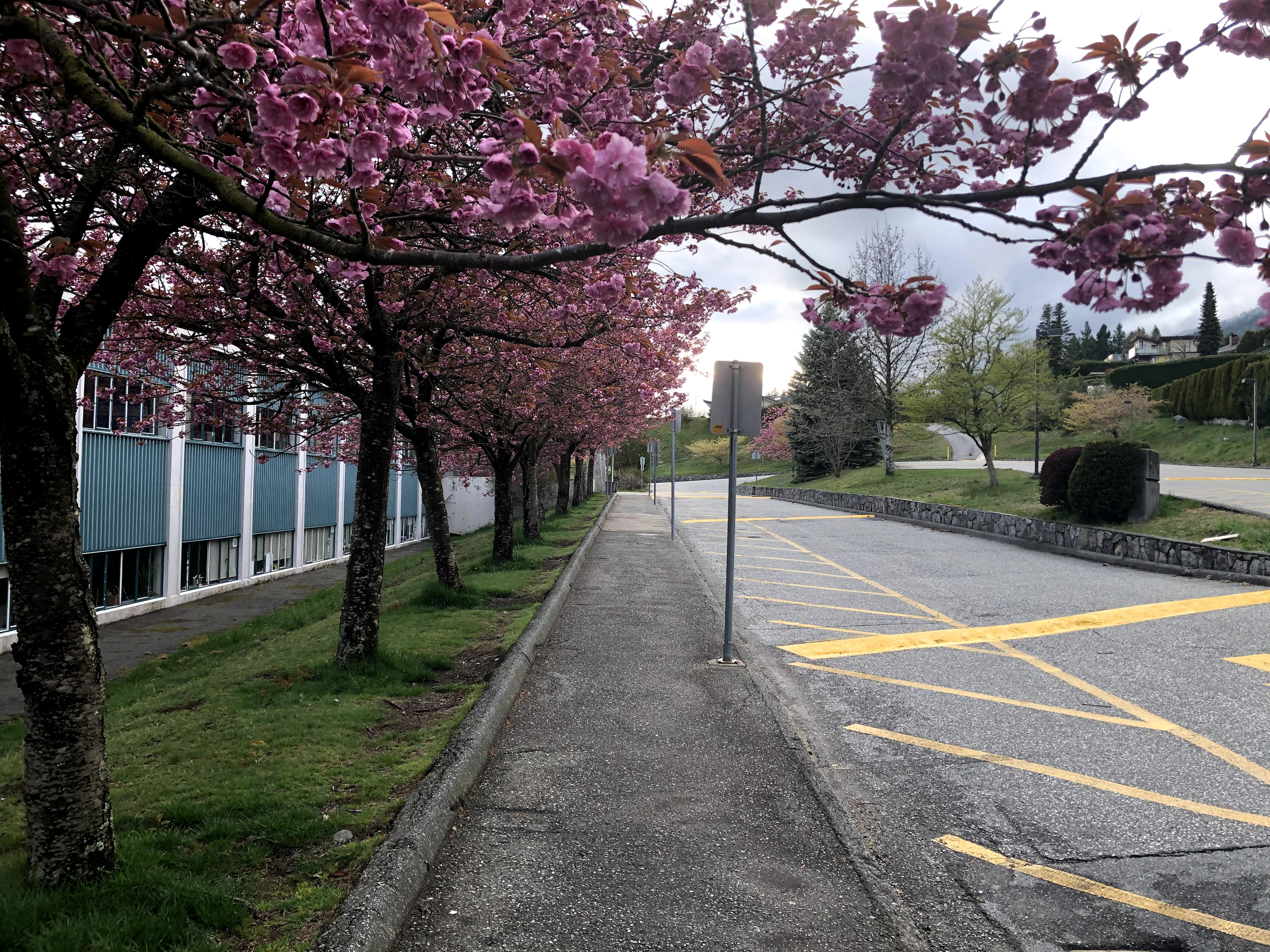
School driveway looking towards main entrance

== Motto ==
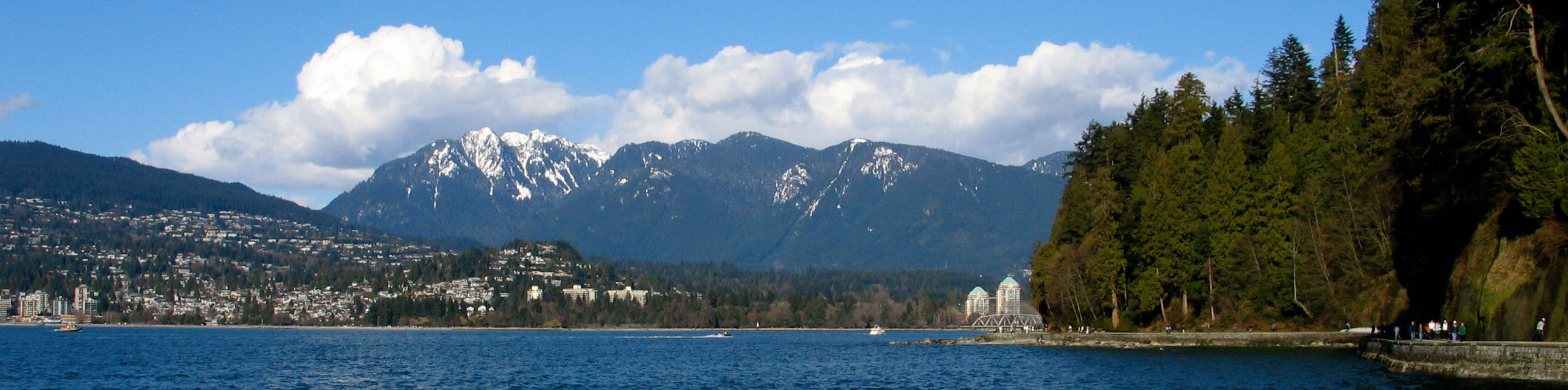
Sentinel Secondary School is located in the British Properties, West Vancouver

The school motto, Summis Cum Animis, is Latin for "with the greatest possible spirit." It was proposed along with a new silver and blue shield logo, by the late Fred Robinson (died 1999), longtime teacher of English and Latin, in 1988 to replace the original motto "Servo" ("I serve"), in part because, Robinson advised, the verb "servo, servire" has connotations of slavery. At the same time, Robinson proposed replacing the school colours (brown and white) with the current blue and silver.
