= BlueShore Financial =

Canadian credit union

- Trade name: BlueShore Financial
- Type: Credit union
- Industry: Financial services
- Founded: 1941
- Headquarters: North Vancouver, British Columbia, Canada
- Area served: British Columbia, Canada
- Key people: Ian Thomas (President of BlueShore Division) and Brian Harris (CEO of Beem Credit Union)
- Number of employees: 370
- Subsidiaries: BlueShore Capital Corporation; BlueShore Leasing; BlueShore Strata Finance; BlueShore Wealth; Morningside Properties
- Website: blueshorefinancial.com

BlueShore Financial, is a Canadian financial institution founded in 1941, headquartered in the City of North Vancouver, British Columbia. It operates as a division of Beem Credit Union. BlueShore Financial offers a full-service financial institution, with wealth management, leasing, and business lending to individuals and businesses across the Lower Mainland, Sea-to-Sky Corridor, and surrounding regions.

Its subsidiaries include BlueShore Wealth, BlueShore Leasing, BlueShore Strata Finance, BlueShore Capital Corporation, and Morningside Properties.
