= Rockridge Secondary School =

Location
- 5350 Headland Dr. West Vancouver, British Columbia, V7W 3H2; Canada; 49.3490°N 123.2534°W

Information
- School type: Public, high school
- Motto: Esse Quam Videri (To be, rather than to seem)
- Founded: 1996
- School board: School District 45 West Vancouver
- Superintendent: Mr. Chris Kennedy
- School number: 4205069
- Principal: Mr. Trevor Kolkea
- Staff: 47 teachers; 6 administrators; 3 counsellors; 15 facilities
- Grades: 8-12
- Enrollment: 945 (September 2016)
- Language: English
- Area: West Vancouver, British Columbia
- Colours: Burgundy, Navy Blue
- Mascot: Ringo the Raven
- Team name: Rockridge Ravens
- Website: www.westvancouverschools.ca/rockridge-secondary/

Rockridge Secondary School is a five-year secondary school located in West Vancouver, British Columbia, Canada. It is one of the three principal public high schools in West Vancouver. The school has a grass field and one baseball diamond. The main field is used for all sports, such as soccer, and Rugby.

== History ==
As early as 1993 the District of West Vancouver received considerable demand that a new community centre was needed in the western part of the district, due in part to the district's rising population throughout the 1980s and early 1990s, as well as the geographic positioning of many of its residents – the main community centre was a 15-30 minute drive for some. After a piece of vacant land in the Caulfeild neighborhood was purchased, plans began for a multi-use facility, which would house a swimming pool, gym, and new middle school. After several rounds of public input and concerns over expenditure, the project was scaled back to build just a middle school that would replace the aging Hillside school 5 km away in upper Ambleside. As 2012, the school receives hundreds of international students every year to make school exchange, mainly students from China, Japan and South American countries such as Brazil and Colombia.

== Design and construction ==
The design and construction of the school was at the time considered to be very advanced. With a concrete superstructure and wood roof and supporting beams, the school resembles a ski lodge. The groups of beams put together on the front side of the school, resembling trees some say, help with stability and support during a tsunami. Also, the lights in many of the classrooms are hung from thin cables to allow sway, again in the event of an earthquake. Technology was a key area of expenditure, with BC Tel (now Telus) and SD45 investing in hundreds of kilometres of fibreoptic cable and extensive audio-visual networking equipment provided by Dynacom. The result was the most technologically advanced school in the province – televisions in each classroom were networked with a tape room and broadcast centre which provided a morning news slide show (as well as VHS and DVD presentations in classrooms), fibreoptic cable reached each classroom, and geothermal heating and cooling regulated the building's temperature. Today, much of the fiber optic equipment is unused, due in part to the declining application of fiber in a LAN environment in the late 1990s.

== Opening ==
Rockridge opened in September 1996, as a middle school serving grades 7–9. After the restructuring of the School District 45 in the 1998–1999 school year, elementary students stayed at their schools that were expanded to include grade 7. Rockridge then became a school for students in grades 8-10. The most recent change to the school population came in the 2001–2002 school year, when SD45 decided to expand Rockridge to a full senior secondary school starting the following year (it had been previously known as a junior secondary and before that a middle school). Students who were in grade 10 at that time were given the option to complete grades 11 and 12 at West Vancouver Secondary School or stay at Rockridge as the school expanded by one grade each year until graduation in 2004. Because of the capacity of the school (which was not originally designed to hold five grades), the graduating class of 2004 was about 125 students, as opposed to the larger classes of WVSS which could number in the hundreds.

== Media attention ==
West Vancouver is considered to be one of the most affluent areas in Canada. As a result, news stories surrounding incidents and violence at the school are often covered widely at the provincial and even national level.. In 2009, a police lockdown reached national attention, with a local resident reporting that they had seen a person with a rifle walking towards the school. Over 50 police officers, a helicopter, a mobile police station, and an emergency response team armed with AR-15 semi-automatic rifles were sent to the school. It was eventually determined to be a student holding a video camera tripod. Rockridge parents and students were told by police that using text messaging and Facebook services may have undermined police work, and that care should be taken when revealing information about a lockdown to the public. In response, some students organized a "Bring A Tripod To School Day" event to satirize the lockdown.

== Advanced Placement Program ==
Rockridge, along with Sentinel Secondary School, offers Advanced Placement Program (AP) courses. It is currently a candidate school for the International Baccalaureate Middle Years program. The following courses are offered:

- AP Calculus AB 12
- AP Calculus BC 12
- AP Computer Science Principles 12
- AP English Literature and Composition 12
- AP English Language and Composition 12
- AP European History
- AP French Language 12
- AP Studio Arts: Drawing and Painting 12
- AP Biology 12
- AP Statistics 12
- AP Psychology 12
- AP Chemistry 12
- AP Physics 1
- AP Physics 2
- Pre-AP Biology 11
- Pre-AP English 11
- Pre-AP English 10
