= Snug Cove =

Community in British Columbia, Canada

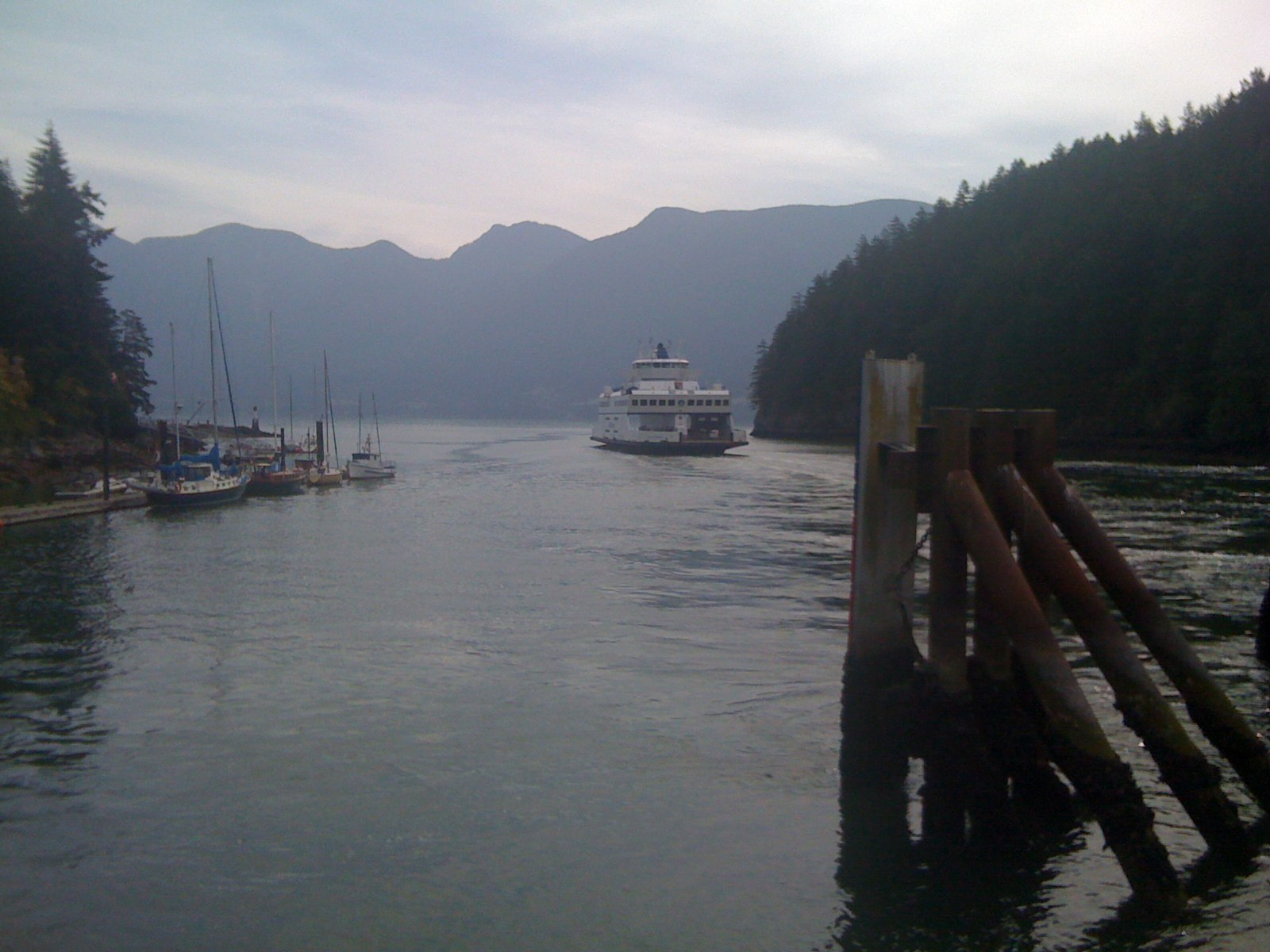
- The Queen of Capilano leaving Snug Cove

- Location of Snug Cove Snug Cove (Canada)
- Coordinates: 49°22′45″N 123°20′14″W
- Country: Canada
- Province: British Columbia

Snug Cove is a community on the east coast of Bowen Island, British Columbia, opposite Horseshoe Bay. It is the site of the Bowen Island (Snug Cove) ferry terminal operated by BC Ferries, where most people and cargo travel between Bowen Island and the mainland. The island is 6 kilometres (3.7 mi) wide by 12 kilometres (7.5 mi) long and 3 kilometres (1.9 mi) west of the mainland, and has a population of around 3,700 people.

The Squamish hunters and fishermen were the first people to stay in the area using the site of the present community as a temporary camp. The Squamish name for this area was Xwilil Xhwm, which has been translated as "fast drumming ground" a name which has been connected to the Squamish story of how the black-tailed deer were created on the island. Early European settlers arriving in Snug Cove discovered shake dwellings and a smoke house.

Snug Cove is noted for its marina and its buildings from the early 1900s, some of which (like the old post office and a group of cottages overlooking the marina) were built by the Union Steamship Company. In the 1920s some 5,000 people were known to arrive at Snug Cove and up to 800 couples could dance at what was then the largest dance hall in British Columbia. The resort was disbanded in the 1960s. Snug Cove is the location of The Bowen Island Public Library which is located in what is known as "The Old General Store".

== Marina ==
Snug Cove is home to the Union Steamship Marina, capable of berthing craft up to 200 feet long. The Company ran a busy resort at Snug Cove for much of the 20th century. Day trips regularly ferried people over to Snug Cove for concerts in the band shell, with refreshments being available in the company tearooms and company outings to various picnic grounds. BC Ferries' Bowen Island ferry route to Horseshoe Bay docks there.

== Popular media ==
Snug Cove was one of the main locations for the 2019–2021 Netflix series Virgin River, set in a fictional Northern California town of 600 people. The library, main streets and Artisan Lane are featured.
