= Bowen Island Undercurrent =

Canadian newspaper in British Columbia

- Type: Weekly newspaper
- Owner(s): Glacier Media
- Publisher: Peter Kvarnstrom
- Editor: Alex Kurial
- Founded: 1975
- Language: English
- Headquarters: Bowen Island, British Columbia, Canada
- Circulation: 900 (as of 2022)
- Website: www.bowenislandundercurrent.com

The Bowen Island Undercurrent is a newspaper in Bowen Island, British Columbia published weekly. The Undercurrent publishes every Thursday.

== History ==
The paper began in 1975 as essentially a newsletter for the island. It was born of a dispute between The Times of North and West Vancouver and columnist Pat Weaver. Weaver created her own paper after a disagreement with the GVRD director of the day and called it her "free speech project." After 12 editions, Weaver left on vacation and never returned to the island, leaving Larry Reid as editor and publisher for the next 13 years. The paper incorporated in 1977 and by 1981 was up to 40 legal-sized pages and a circulation of 800. That same year the paper moved from its stapled mimeograph format to being a tabloid, which it remains to this day. In 1988, Reid sold the paper to Eric Cardwell, owner of the Westender and the East Ender newspapers. In 1997, Black Press bought the paper and in 2013 Glacier Media acquired the Undercurrent in a paper swap.

== See also ==
- List of newspapers in Canada
