= Undercurrents =

Undercurrents may refer to:

- Undercurrents (magazine), a UK magazine of radical and alternative technology
- Undercurrents (news), a UK alternative video news network
- Undercurrents (TV series), a Canadian television newsmagazine
- Undercurrents, a novel by Ridley Pearson
