= List of Canada city name etymologies =

This article lists the etymologies of the names of cities across Canada.

== Alberta ==
City	Language of origin	Explanation
Airdrie	Scottish Gaelic	Named for Airdrie, North Lanarkshire, in Scotland. Possibly originally from Gaelic An Àrd Ruigh meaning a level height or high pasture.
Brooks	English	Named for Noel Edgell Brooks, a Canadian Pacific Railway Divisional Engineer from Calgary. Brooks' name was chosen through a contest in 1904.
Calgary	Scottish Gaelic	Named for Calgary, Mull, which originated from the Scottish Gaelic "Cala ghearraidh", meaning "beach of the meadow (pasture)". The name was suggested by Colonel James Macleod, Commissioner of the North-West Mounted Police, who had stayed at Calgary Castle.
Camrose	English	There is no factual evidence to explain why the city was named Camrose. It is suspected that it is named after the village of Camrose in Pembrokeshire, South Wales.
Chestermere	English	Named after Chestermere Lake, a man-made reservoir built in 1880.
Cold Lake	English	Named after the nearby lake, which was named for its cold and deep water.
Edmonton	English	Named for Edmonton, London.
Fort Saskatchewan	English	Named after a fort built by the North-West Mounted Police in 1875.
Grande Prairie	French	Named for its location, literally it means "great meadow" or "big prairie".
Lacombe	French	Named for Albert Lacombe, a French-Canadian Roman Catholic Oblate missionary who lived among and evangelized the Cree and Blackfoot First Nations of western Canada.
Leduc	French	While the city is named after Father Hippolyte Leduc, a French-Canadian priest who served in the area, there is a dispute over how the designation became official. One story is that the settlement was named after Leduc by the Minister of the Interior, Edgar Dewdney. The other story is that the settler who established the local telegraph office, which required a name to be associated with it, decided to name the settlement after the first person to walk through the door of the office, who turned out to be Leduc.
Lethbridge	English	Named for William Lethbridge.
Lloydminster	English	Named for George Lloyd, who at the time was the bishop of the Diocese of Saskatchewan.
Medicine Hat	English / Blackfoot	Translation of Blackfoot Saamis, a type of headdress worn by medicine men.
Red Deer	English / Cree	Mistranslation into English of the Cree name for the Red Deer River, Waskasoo Seepee, which means "Wapiti River" or "Elk River". North American elk (aka Wapiti) are often confused with European red deer.
Spruce Grove	English	Named after the groves of spruce trees which were common in the area.
St. Albert	French	Named by Bishop Alexandre-Antonin Taché after Father Albert Lacombe and his patron name saint Albert of Louvain.
Wetaskiwin	Cree	Translation of the Cree word 'wītaskiwinihk', meaning "the hills where peace was made".

== British Columbia ==
City	Language of origin	Explanation
Abbotsford	English	There is some controversy over the origin of the Abbotsford name. The most commonly cited origin is that John Cunningham Maclure named the land "Abbotsford" after family friend Henry Braithwaite Abbott, the western superintendent of the Canadian Pacific Railway. Maclure's sons later stated that the property had actually been named for Sir Walter Scott's home, Abbotsford, and pronounced it with the accent on ford, while in his later years Maclure himself claimed that the naming had been "a combination of two ideas".
Armstrong	English	Named for E.C. Heaton Armstrong, a London banker who helped finance the Shuswap and Okanagan Railway in 1892 and local development at the turn of the century.
Burnaby	English/Danish	Named for Robert Burnaby as the result of a public vote.
Campbell River	English	Named after the nearby river, which in turn was named by Captain George Henry Richards for Samuel Campbell, the surgeon on board HMS Plumper.
Castlegar	Irish	Named after Castlegar Estate, near Ahascragh in County Galway, Ireland.
Chilliwack	Halq'eméylem	Anglicization of the Halq'eméylem word Tcil'Qe'uk, meaning "valley of many streams".
Colwood	English	Named by Captain Edward Langford for his family farm in Sussex, England.
Coquitlam	Coast Salish	Anglicization of the word Kwikwetlem, meaning "red fish up the river".
Courtenay	English	Named after the Courtenay River, which was named after Captain George William Courtenay of HMS Constance, which was stationed in the area.
Cranbrook	English	Named by Colonel James Baker after his home in Cranbrook, Kent, England.
Dawson Creek	English	Named after the creek of the same name, which was named after George Mercer Dawson. who led a surveying team through the area in August 1879; a member of the team labelled the creek with Dawson's name.
Delta	English	Named for its location on the Fraser River delta.
Duncan	English	Named for William Chalmers Duncan, one of the original settlers of the community.
Enderby	English	Named after a line in the poem "The High Tide on the Coast of Lincolnshire," by Jean Ingelow: The old mayor climbed the belfry tower, The ringers ran by two, by three; "Pull, if ye never pulled before; Good ringers, pull your best," quoth he. "Play uppe, play uppe, O Boston bells! Ply all your changes, all your swells, Play uppe 'The Brides of Enderby".
Fernie	English	Named for William Fernie, a miner who founded the city.
Fort St. John	English	There is no confirmed explanation for the city's name. Some suggest that it received its name as a result of the original fort being founded on the feast day of St John the Baptist. Another story is that the name originates as nothing more than a suggestion by an employee of the Hudson's Bay Company, which renamed the community after rebuilding it due to arson.
Grand Forks	English	Named for its location at the fork between the Kettle and Granby Rivers.
Greenwood	English	Named after Robert Wood, one of the original settlers in the area. Greenwood was chosen as an appropriate name given Wood's last name and the presence of green timber in the area.
Kamloops	Shuswap	Anglicization of the word Tk'əmlúps, meaning "meeting of the waters".
Kelowna	Okanagan	Named after the Okanagan term for a female grizzly bear. According to myth, the name was inspired by a husky French Canadian settler named Augustus Gillard, who lived in a half-underground dwelling known as a keekwillee. When some passing Indians saw him emerge from his home one morning, they called him "kemxtús" as he resembled a bear exiting its den. The name was brought up as a potential name for the new community, but it was changed to Kelowna as the original name was considered too uncouth.
Kimberley	English	Named after Kimberley, South Africa, which in turn was named after John Wodehouse, 1st Earl of Kimberley. The city was named after its counterpart in the hopes that the mining in the area would prove as bountiful as those found in South Africa.
Langford	English	Named for Captain Edward Langford, who established one of the four Hudson's Bay Company farms in the Victoria area.
Langley	English	Named after Fort Langley, a fort owned by the Hudson's Bay Company. The fort was named for Thomas Langley, a prominent HBC director)
Maple Ridge	English	Named for the abundance of maple trees in the area.
Merritt	English	Named for railway promoter William Hamilton Merritt III. The original name of the settlement was Forksdale.
Nanaimo	Halq'eméylem	Anglicization of the word Sne-ny-mo, meaning "group of many people" and referring to the confederacy of five local bands.
Nelson	English	Named for Hugh Nelson, fourth Lieutenant Governor of British Columbia.
New Westminster	English	Named by Queen Victoria after Westminster, England. The original proposed name of the city was Queensborough.
North Vancouver (city)	English	Named for its geographical location north of Vancouver.
Parksville	English	Named for Nelson Parks, the postmaster at the time of incorporation.
Penticton	Okanagan	Anglicization of the word pente-hik-ton, meaning "place where water passes beyond", in reference to the year-round flow of the Okanagan River.
Pitt Meadows	English	Named after the Pitt River and Pitt Lake, which were possibly named after former British Prime Minister William Pitt.
Port Alberni	Spanish	Named for Captain Don Pedro de Alberni, a Spanish officer who commanded Fort San Miguel at Nootka Sound on Vancouver Island's west coast from 1790 to 1792.
Port Coquitlam	Coast Salish	Anglicization of the word Kwikwetlem, meaning "red fish up the river".
Port Moody	English	Named by Captain George Henry Richards of HMS Plumper for Colonel Richard Clement Moody of the Royal Engineers. Moody was the commissioner of lands and works in the new Colony of British Columbia.
Powell River	English	Named after the Powell River, which in turn was named after Doctor Israel Wood Powell, who was the Superintendent of Indian Affairs for British Columbia and the first graduate of medicine from McGill University to practice on the west coast.
Prince George	English	Named after Fort George, a North West Company trading post, which in turn was named by Simon Fraser in honour of King George III.
Prince Rupert	English	Named for Prince Rupert of the Rhine, the first Governor of the Hudson's Bay Company, as the result of an open competition held by the Grand Trunk Railway.
Quesnel	English/French	Named by Simon Fraser for Jules Maurice Quesnel, one of two North West Company clerks who accompanied him on the expedition where he discovered the Quesnel River.
Revelstoke	English	Named by the Canadian Pacific Railway in appreciation of Lord Revelstoke, head of Baring Brothers & Co., the British investment bank that helped save the Canadian Pacific Railway from bankruptcy in the summer of 1885.
Richmond	English	Named by Hugh McRoberts for Richmonds Farm in Australia.
Rossland	English	Named by Ross Thompson after himself in 1890, after purchasing the land the settlement was to be built on. He originally attempted to name the settlement Thompson, but there was already a town in BC by that name.
Salmon Arm	English	Named for the southwest arm of Shuswap Lake, which bears the same name. The arm received its name due to its heavy population of salmon; settlers often pitchforked them out of the water and used them for fertilizer on their fields.
Surrey	English	The city is named after the county of Surrey in England, however the reasoning why is disputed. One story suggests the name arose out of a meeting of settlers, one of which was reminded of Surrey by the countryside. Another story suggests it was named Surrey because it lies south of New Westminster, just as the county of Surrey lies south of Westminster in England.
Terrace	English	Named by George Little after the terraces which surrounded the Skeena River. The settlement was originally to be named Littleton, however this name was rejected by the post office as there was already a Littleton in New Brunswick.
Trail	English	Named after the Dewdney Trail, which passed through the area.
Vancouver	English, Dutch	Named for Captain George Vancouver, an officer of the British Royal Navy.
Vernon	English	Named for Forbes George Vernon, a pioneer member part of the Legislative Assembly of British Columbia for Yale.
Victoria	English	Named for Queen Victoria.
West Kelowna	Okanagan / English	Named for its geographical location west of Kelowna.
White Rock	English	Named for a large white boulder found on the beach near the city, which was used by sailors as a navigational aid. The 486-ton granite boulder was kept white by shellfish-eating seabirds whose guano covered the rock.
Williams Lake	English	Named for William, a Secwepemc chief whose counsel prevented the Shuswap from joining the Tsilhqot'in in their uprising against the settler population.

== Manitoba ==
City	Language of origin	Explanation
Brandon	English	Named by General Thomas Rosser after the Blue Hills of Brandon, which got their name from Brandon House.
Dauphin	French	Named after nearby Dauphin Lake, which was named by French Canadian explorer Pierre Gaultier de Varennes, sieur de La Vérendrye in 1739 in honour of Louis, Dauphin of France.
Flin Flon	English	Named after the character of Josiah Flintabbatey Flonatin in the novel The Sunless City by J. E. Preston Muddock.
Morden	English	Named after Alvey Morden, the original owner of the land that the community was established on.
Portage la Prairie	French	The name is derived from the French word portage, which means to carry a canoe overland between waterways. In this case the "portage" was between the Assiniboine River and Lake Manitoba, over la prairie.
Selkirk	English	Named after Thomas Douglas, 5th Earl of Selkirk, who helped establish the Red River Colony.
Steinbach	German	Named after the village in Ukraine, where the city's founders emigrated from. The city's founders spoke Plautdietsch but wrote in High German. The name means "Stone Brook" in German.
Thompson	English	Named after John F. Thompson, the chairman of Inco Limited. The community was designed as a planned community by the company to house workers for its nearby mining operations.
Winkler	German	Named after Valentine Winkler, a local politician and business owner.
Winnipeg	Cree	Western Cree word meaning "muddy waters".

== New Brunswick ==
City	Language of origin	Explanation
Bathurst	English	Named for the British Colonial Secretary, Henry Bathurst, 3rd Earl Bathurst.
Campbellton	English	Named by Robert Ferguson in honour of Lieutenant Governor Sir Archibald Campbell.
Dieppe	French	Named in the memory of the 913 Canadians who were killed during the Dieppe Raid in the Second World War.
Edmundston	English	Named for Lieutenant Governor Sir Edmund Walker Head.
Fredericton	English	Named for the second son of King George III of Great Britain, Prince Frederick Augustus, Duke of York.
Miramichi	Innu	Named after the Miramichi River, which is likely derived from the Innu term "Maissimeu Assi", meaning "Mi'kmaq Land".
Moncton	English	Named for Lieutenant Colonel Robert Monckton, who captured nearby Fort Beauséjour.
Saint John	English	Named in commemoration of John the Baptist; the Saint John River supposedly was discovered on Saint-Jean-Baptiste Day (June 24).

== Newfoundland and Labrador ==
City	Language of origin	Explanation
Corner Brook	English	Named for a stream which flows through the area into the Humber Arm.
Mount Pearl	English	Named for James Pearl, who in 1829 was granted the land the city was founded on in recognition of his time in the Royal Navy. He named the estate after himself in 1837, after having originally named it Mount Cochrane in honour of Sir Thomas John Cochrane, the first civil governor of Newfoundland.
St. John's	English, Basque or Spanish	Named for the feast day of Saint John the Baptist, which was the date of landing by John Cabot. The name by Basque fishermen for the bay of St. John's was similar to the Bay of Pasaia in the Basque region, and one of the fishing towns called St. John (in Spanish, San Juan).

== Northwest Territories ==
City	Language of origin	Explanation
Yellowknife	Dene Suline / English	Named for the Yellowknives Dene First Nation

== Nova Scotia ==
City	Language of origin	Explanation
Dartmouth	English	Named for British Secretary of State for the Colonies William Legge, 2nd Earl of Dartmouth.
Halifax	English	Named for George Montagu-Dunk, 2nd Earl of Halifax, President of the Board of Trade
Sydney	English	Named for British Home Secretary Thomas Townshend, 1st Viscount Sydney

== Nunavut ==
City	Language of origin	Explanation
Iqaluit	Inuktitut	Inuktitut word meaning "many fish"

== Ontario ==
City	Language of origin	Explanation
Barrie	English	Named for Sir Robert Barrie, who was in charge of the naval forces in Canada and frequently had to portage from Lake Simcoe to Georgian Bay.
Belleville	English	Named after Lady Arabella Gore, wife of Sir Francis Gore, following a visit by the two to the settlement in 1816. The community was previously known as Singleton's Creek, after an early settler named George Singleton, and Meyer's Creek, after John Walden Meyers.
Brampton	English	Named after Brampton, England, by a settler named John Elliot.
Brant	English	Named after Mohawk Chief Thayendanegea (also known as Joseph Brant), who allied his people with the British during the American Revolution and ultimately led to them receiving a land grant for the area at the site of the current city.
Brantford	English	Named after Mohawk Chief Thayendanegea (also known as Joseph Brant), who allied his people with the British during the American Revolution and ultimately led to them receiving a land grant for the area at the site of the current city. The original Mohawk settlement was at a location favourable for landing canoes, which quickly became known as Brant's ford.
Brockville	English	Named after Sir Isaac Brock in 1812 by the settlement's residents in honour of his service to Upper Canada. The original name, Elizabethtown, had been selected by government officials but was unpopular with residents, who opted to use Brockville until it was officially changed several years later.
Burlington	English	Named after the nearby bay of the same name (now Hamilton Harbour), which was named in 1792 by Lieutenant Governor of Upper Canada John Graves Simcoe in honour of the original name of Bridlington, England.
Cambridge	English	The city received its name in 1973 following the amalgamation of the towns of Galt, Preston and Hespeler into a single municipality. The name Cambridge originates from Preston's name prior to 1834, Cambridge Mills.
Clarence-Rockland	English	The city received its name in 1998 following the amalgamation of the Clarence Township and the Town of Rockland.
Cornwall	English	Named after the Duchy of Cornwall.
Dryden	English	Named after John Dryden, who served as Ontario's Minister of Agriculture in 1895 and founded the settlement as an agricultural community after visiting the area.
Elliot Lake	English	Named after the neighbouring lake of the same name.
Greater Sudbury	English	Named for Sudbury, Suffolk in England; "Greater" was added in 2001 when the city of Sudbury was amalgamated with six suburban municipalities.
Guelph	English	Named to honour Britain's royal family, the Hanoverians, who were descended from the Guelfs, the ancestral family of George IV, the reigning British monarch; thus the nickname The Royal City.
Haldimand County	English	Named after Sir Frederick Haldimand, the Governor of the Province of Quebec from 1778 to 1786.
Hamilton	English	Named for George Hamilton, the city's founder.
Kawartha Lakes	Anishinaabe	Named after the nearby lakes of the same name, which are an Anglicization of the Anishinaabe word Ka-wa-tha, meaning "land of reflections". The name was later changed to Kawartha, which means "bright waters and happy lands".
Kenora	Ojibwe / English	The name is a portmanteau of the names of the three towns which amalgamated in 1905 to form the present-day city: Keewatin, Norman and Rat Portage.
Kingston	English	Originally referred to as "the King's Town", the name was shortened to Kingston in 1788. The settlement's original name, Cataraqui, likely was derived from an Iroquois word meaning "the place where one hides".
Kitchener	English	Originally named Berlin thanks to the German heritage of many of its citizens, in 1916 the city changed its name to Kitchener in response to anti-German sentiment during the First World War. The name Kitchener was suggested in honour of British military officer Horatio Herbert Kitchener, who had died that same year. The other options in the referendum were Adanac, Brock, Benton, Corona, and Keowana.
London	English	Named by John Graves Simcoe in 1826 after London, England.
Markham	English	Named by John Graves Simcoe after his friend, William Markham, the Archbishop of York.
Mississauga	Ojibwe	Named for the Mississaugas who originally inhabited the area.
Niagara Falls	Iroquois	Named after the eponymous waterfalls. There are differing theories as to the origin of the word "Niagara", with one theory suggesting the name is derived from a local tribe named the Niagagarega, and another theory suggesting it is an Anglicization of the word "Ongniaahra", meaning "point of land cut in two".
Norfolk County	English	Named for Norfolk County in England.
North Bay	English	Named for its geographical location on the shore of Lake Nipissing.
Orillia	Spanish	The first recorded use of the name Orillia was in 1820 by Sir Peregrine Maitland, then-Lieutenant Governor of Ontario. There is no record as to the meaning of the name, however the most common explanation is that it originates from the Spanish word "orilla", which means the shore of a lake or river.
Oshawa	Ojibwe	Anglicization of the Ojibwa term "aazhaway", meaning "the cross place".
Ottawa	Odawa	The Ottawa Valley was the traditional home of the Algonquin people (Anishinaabe) who called the Ottawa River the Kichi Sibi or Kichissippi' meaning "Great River" or "Grand River". Despite the name of the city, the Ottawa people, another First Nation who lived far to the west along Georgian Bay and Lake Huron never lived in the area, but rather maintained a trade route along the Ottawa River for a relatively short time.
Owen Sound	English	The area of the present city was named Owen Sound by William Fitzwilliam Owen in 1815 after his older brother, Admiral Edward Owen. The settlement received its current name in 1851. It had previously been known as Sydenham.
Pembroke	English	Indirectly named after Sidney Herbert, who served as British First Admiralty Secretary from 1841 to 1845. His father was the 11th Earl of Pembroke.
Peterborough	English	Named after Peter Robinson, a member of the Legislative Assembly of Upper Canada and the man primarily responsible for the 1825 emigration plans which saw Irish immigrants settle in the area.
Pickering	English	Named after Pickering, North Yorkshire, England.
Port Colborne	English	Named in honour of former Lieutenant Governor Sir John Colborne.
Prince Edward County	English	Named in honour of Prince Edward Augustus, then-commander-in-chief of British North America.
Quinte West	French/Mohawk	Named for its location on the western end of the Bay of Quinte on Lake Ontario. The name Quinte is derived from the French name "Kenté", which was the name of a French Catholic mission in the area.
Sarnia	Latin	Named after the Latin term for Guernsey, one of the British Channel Islands.
Sault Ste. Marie	French	Named for the rapids in the St. Mary's River. The city shares its name with Sault Ste. Marie, Michigan, as they were a singular community prior to the establishment of the Canadian-United States border.
St. Catharines	English	The origins of the name are obscure, but it is thought that the city is named after Catharine Askin Robertson Hamilton, who was the wife of Robert Hamilton, a prominent businessman.
St. Thomas	English	Named in honour of Thomas Talbot.
Stratford	English	Named after Stratford-upon-Avon, England.
Temiskaming Shores	Algonquin	Named after neighbouring Lake Timiskaming, which means "deep waters" in Algonquin. The city received its name in 2004 following the amalgamation of New Liskeard, Haileybury, and Dymond.
Thorold	English	Named after Sir John Thorold, a former British MP in response to his opposition to war with the United States.
Thunder Bay	English, French	Named for the bay on which the city is located, which was originally labelled Baie du Tonnerre on French maps in the 17th century. The name was chosen by referendum in 1969 with the merger of the cities of Fort William and Port Arthur.
Timmins	English	Named by Alphonse Paré in 1912 in honour of his uncle Noah Timmins, President of Hollinger Mines.
Toronto	Iroquoian	Derived from word "tkaronto", meaning "place where trees stand in the water".
Vaughan	English	Named for Benjamin Vaughan, a British commissioner who signed the peace treaty with the United States in 1783.
Waterloo	Dutch	Named after Waterloo, Belgium.
Welland	English	Named after the Welland Canal, which formerly ran directly through downtown Welland. The name Welland is derived from the River Welland in Lincolnshire, England.
Windsor	English	Named after Windsor, Berkshire, England.
Woodstock	English	Named by the city's founder, Admiral Henry Vansittart in 1834 after Woodstock, England.

== Prince Edward Island ==
City	Language of origin	Explanation
Charlottetown	English	Named for Charlotte of Mecklenburg-Strelitz, consort of King George III of Great Britain
Summerside	English	Named for Summerside House, an inn operated by the son of the settlement's founder.

== Quebec ==
City	Language of origin	Explanation
Chicoutimi	Innu	The name means "The end of the deep water" in the Innu/Montagnais language
Montreal	Middle French	Named for "Mont Réal", or Mount Royal, a geological feature located within the city. The mountain was named in honour of Francis I of France by Jacques Cartier.
Quebec City	Algonquin	French transcription of the Algonquin word "kébec", which means "where the river narrows"

== Saskatchewan ==
City	Language of origin	Explanation
Estevan	English	Named after the telegraphic address of George Stephen, first President of the Canadian Pacific Railway.
Humboldt	German	Named after German explorer Alexander von Humboldt.
North Battleford	English	The name Battleford originated from a nearby ford of the Battle River. The city is named North Battleford to distinguish it from the town of Battleford, which is located south across the North Saskatchewan River.
Martensville	English	Named after the Martens family, who founded the city on land which they had previously purchased.
Meadow Lake	English	Named after the nearby lake, which is the source of the Meadow River.
Melfort	English	Named by Reginald Beatty, the first European woman to settle in the area, after her family estate in Argyll, Scotland.
Melville	English	Named for Charles Melville Hays, President of the Grand Trunk Railway and Grand Trunk Pacific Railway.
Prince Albert	English	Named by James Nisbet in honour of Prince Albert, the husband of Queen Victoria.
Regina	Latin	Named by Princess Louise, wife of the then-Governor General of Canada the Marquess of Lorne in honour of Queen Victoria; Regina is the Latin word for queen.
Saskatoon	Cree	Named after the saskatoon berry. The berry's name is an anglicization of the Cree word misâskwatômina, meaning "the fruit of the tree of many branches".
Swift Current	French/Cree	Named after the Swift Current Creek, which was originally called Riviere au Couran by the Metis. That name was likely inspired by the Cree name for the South Saskatchewan River, Kisiskâciwan, which means "fast flowing river".
Warman	English	Named after American journalist Cy Warman, who recorded the construction of the Canadian Northern Railway.
Weyburn	English	The origin of the city's name is disputed. One story is that the city is named after a worker who supervised the building of the railroad in the area. Another story is the name came from a Scottish man who exclaimed "Wee Burn!" after stumbling upon the Souris River on a hot day.
Yorkton	English	The name of the city is inspired by the York Farmers' Colonization Company, which led the founding and initial settlement of the community. Originally named York Colony, it was changed to Yorkton in 1884.

== Yukon ==
City	Language of origin	Explanation
Whitehorse	English	Named for the White Horse Rapids, which were said to look like the mane of a white horse.

== See also ==
- Canadian provincial and territorial name etymologies
- List of Canadian place names of Ukrainian origin
- List of place names in Canada of Aboriginal origin
- Locations in Canada with an English name
- Name of Canada
- Royal eponyms in Canada
- Scottish place names in Canada
- Toponymy of Nova Scotia

== Sources ==
- Brown, Thomas J. (1922). Place-Names of the Province of Nova Scotia . Halifax, N.S.: Royal Print & Litho – via Wikisource.
- Hessel, Peter D. K. (1987). The Algonkin Tribe. Arnprior, Ontario: Kichesippi Books. ISBN 0-921082-01-0.
- MacMillan, Gail (1978). An Outline of the History of Bathurst. Sackville, New Brunswick.
- McMillan, Alan D.; Yellowhorn, Eldon (2004). First Peoples in Canada (3rd ed.). Douglas & McIntyre. ISBN 1-55365-053-0.
- Fergusson, C. Bruce (1967). Place-Names and Places of Nova Scotia. Halifax, N.S.: Public Archives of Nova Scotia.
- Shaw, S. Bernard (1998). Lake Opeongo: Untold Stories of Algonquin Park's Largest Lake. General Store Publishing House. ISBN 978-1-896182-82-7.
- Taylor, John H. (1986). Ottawa: An Illustrated History. J. Lorimer. ISBN 978-0-88862-981-4.
