= Toponymy of Nova Scotia =

Toponymy of Canadian province

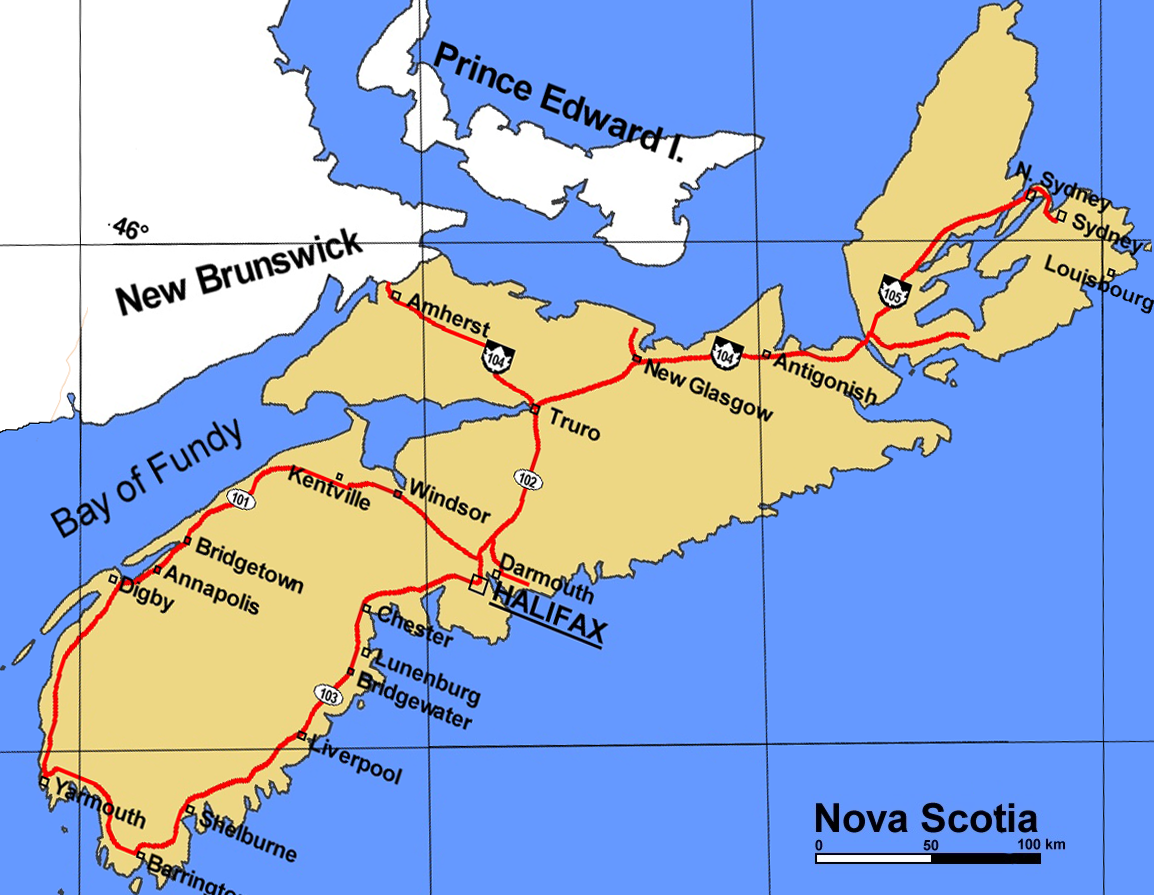
Map of Nova Scotia

The toponymy of the Canadian province of Nova Scotia derives from a variety of distinct linguistic origins. Toponyms in the province are significantly influenced by French and English settlement, and many come from the language of the Mi'kmaq, the Indigenous inhabitants of the province. Spanish, Portuguese, Basque, Scottish, German, and American toponyms can also be found in Nova Scotia, albeit to a lesser degree.

Two major studies have laid the foundations for the study of toponymy in Nova Scotia: Thomas J. Brown's 1922 book Place-Names of the Province of Nova Scotia was the first, and it remained the only work of its kind until the Public Archives of Nova Scotia published Place-Names and Places of Nova Scotia in 1967.

== Background ==
Compared to other provinces in the region, the study of toponymy in Nova Scotia has progressed very slowly. There have been two studies exclusively dedicated to the province's toponyms, the first of which was Place-Names of the Province of Nova Scotia by Thomas J. Brown, published in 1922. The Public Archives of Nova Scotia published Place-Names and Places of Nova Scotia with an introduction by Charles Bruce Fergusson in 1967, which remains the most comprehensive work on the topic. The 1967 study was developed as a special project to celebrate the Canadian Centennial; it contains over 2,300 locations, each with a description of varying length from four or five sentences to several pages. The descriptions discuss the origin of each name, as well as a brief account of the location's history.

In 1960, the journal Onomastica released a special volume on Nova Scotian toponyms with an essay by Robert Dawson. More recent scholarship includes the 502-page Place Names of Atlantic Canada (1996) by William B. Hamilton, professor emeritus at Mount Allison University's social sciences faculty, which includes a chapter on Nova Scotia. Hamilton previously chaired the Toponymic Research Committee of the Canadian Permanent Collection on Geographical Names.

Travel literature, as well as works on general history of the region, also serve as a valuable resource for understanding the place-names of Nova Scotia. The two-volume History of Nova Scotia (1829) by Thomas Chandler Haliburton provides an account of the cultural influences impacting place-names during settlement of the province. Western and Eastern Rambles: Travel Sketches of Nova Scotia (1973), a collection of essays by Joseph Howe published in the Novascotian in the 1830s, informs on place-names in the province during that time.

== Origins ==
=== French ===
Acadian French toponyms are plentiful in Nova Scotia, especially in areas populated by the French-speaking descendants of Acadian settlers. The "French Shore" of Nova Scotia encompasses communities such as Belliveau Cove, Comeauville, Mavillette, Saulnierville, Mochelle, Grosses Coques, Belleisle, and Lac la Rose; all situated between Yarmouth and Digby. French toponyms can be found all across the province, as far as Cape Breton. These include Mahone Bay, Dauphinee Mountain, Boutiliers Cove, and Marie Joseph, all of which are indicative of Acadian settlement.

Communities such as Port La Tour and Lake Rossignol are named after individual Acadian settlers. Noël Doiron, a leader of the Acadians, is the namesake of several communities in Hants County including Noel, Noel Shore, East Noel, Noel Road, and North Noel Road. Two of Nova Scotia's earliest settlements were LaHave River and Petite Rivière, located on the South Shore. Louisbourg, named for King Louis XIV, was the site of an 18th-century French fortress.

Descriptive French toponyms in Nova Scotia include Framboise (raspberry), Grand Étang (large pond), Fourchu (crooked or forked), and L'Ardoise (the slate), named for their characteristics. Some toponyms in the province have retained their French names but lost the associated pronunciations, such as Port Joli and Cape Sable (Cap de Sable).

=== English ===
England acquired mainland Nova Scotia through the Treaty of Utrecht in 1713, while Cape Breton remained a French colony. The influence of the English on place-names was transformative: Port-Royal was renamed to Annapolis in 1710, in honour of Queen Anne, while Piziquid became Windsor.

English toponyms in Nova Scotia include many names borrowed directly from England, thought to reflect the desire of the settlers to maintain tradition and establish a "home away from home". This contrasts with French place-names, of which there are little to none borrowed from France. Traditional English toponyms found in the province include Bedford, Chelsea, Martock, Cornwall, and Southampton, among others. While Nova Scotia has a county named Hants, this has never been considered an abbreviated form of Hampshire as it is in England.

The arrival of the United Empire Loyalists saw further name changes, with Port Razoir becoming Shelburne (named after the Earl of Shelburne) and the Rossignol River becoming the Mersey River, while Lake Rossignol retained its name. Many English settlements in Nova Scotia were named after governors and other notable figures; the community of Dartmouth is named for William Legge, 1st Earl of Dartmouth, and Cumberland County is named for the Duke of Cumberland. The capital of Nova Scotia, Halifax, is named for George Montagu-Dunk, 2nd Earl of Halifax (Lord Halifax). It can be difficult to determine if some toponyms are borrowed from other locations or derived from a title.

=== American ===
A complicating factor of studying Nova Scotian toponymy is the historical presence of American settlers. The village of Weymouth, for example, derives from Weymouth, Massachusetts, as opposed to the town of the same name in England. Similarly, the community of Enfield is named for Enfield, Connecticut, the former residence of an early settler. There has been some debate as to whether the community of Barrington is named for the town in Massachusetts or the title of Viscount Barrington.

The community of Cleveland was named for the president of the United States Grover Cleveland in 1891.

=== Scottish ===
Following the end of the Jacobite rising of 1715, a great number of Scots emigrated to Nova Scotia where they settled along the Northumberland Strait and within Cape Breton. The first settlement by Scottish Highlanders in Antigonish County occurred as late as 1785 at Arisaig, a name borrowed from Inverness-shire in Scotland. Also among their first settlements was the town of New Glasgow, named for Glasgow; not far from here is Loch Broom, named by settlers from the loch of the same name in Scotland who arrived on the ship Hector. The majority of Scottish place-names in the province were assigned in the 19th century, after thousands of Scottish families were provided with land grants. More examples include Knoydart, Dunmaglass, Lochaber, Glengarry, Sunny Brae, and Glen Alpine, all within northern Nova Scotia.

=== Gaelic ===
Gaelic toponyms in Nova Scotia are found exclusively in Cape Breton, the home of the majority of the province's Gaelic speakers. Examples of Gaelic place-names there include Skir Dhu (Black Rock), Ben Eoin (Ewan's Mountain), Sgurra Bhreac (Big Rock), Rudha Mhinistear (The Minister's Point), and Bhein Voirach (Sharp Mountain). Gaelic toponyms are more likely to have endured when assigned to a mountain or other feature rather than a settlement.

=== German ===
There are no toponyms in Nova Scotia that are directly borrowed from Germany, although there is a community known as New Germany. German settlers typically chose descriptive names such as Oak Hill or Blue Rocks; other settlements are named for their early inhabitants, such as Barss Corner and Pentz. The town of Lunenburg is often mistakenly said to be named for Lüneburg, a myth perpetuated by various historians including Thomas Chandler Haliburton. In fact, prior to the arrival of the 1,400 Foreign Protestants recruited from Germany, France, and Switzerland who resettled the area, it was decreed by the governor and council that their settlement would be known as Lunenburg, for the royal house of Braunschweig-Lüneburg.

=== Mi'kmaq ===
The oldest place-names to be found in Nova Scotia derive from the language of the Mi'kmaq, the Indigenous inhabitants of the province. Many lakes bear Mi'kmaq names, such as Ponhook, Mushamush, Meleaguik, Kejimukujik, and Pockwock. Place-names of Mi'kmaq origin are also assigned to a great deal of communities, including Shubenacadie (from Sipekne'katik; place abounding in groundnuts), Chezzetcook (flowing rapidly in many channels), Mushaboom (from Moosaboon-elagwaak; hair of the dead lying there), Musquodoboit (from Moosekudoboogwek or Muskoodeboogwek; rolling out in foam) Necum Teuch (beach of fine sand), Whycocomagh (head of the bay), among many others. It has been disputed whether Ecum Secum derives from a Mi'kmaq term; they referred to the area as Megawasagank, translating to "a red house".

Many Mi'kmaq toponyms contain the suffix akade or katik, (Note: Alternatively agadĭch, gadĭk, atik, adek, e'kati, or a'ki.) such as Pne'katik, Kun'tewe'katik, and Mukla'qatik. This suffix is pronounced similarly to the French word Acadie, leading to confusion among scholars when determining the origin of some names. Shunacadie, for example, comes from the Mi'kmaq word Su'ne'katik. Silas Tertius Rand listed akade as meaning "a place where something abounds" in his Dictionary of the language of the Micmac Indians; it may translate to simply "ground of" or "place of".

On 1 October 2015, the Mi'kmaq Place Names Digital Atlas and Website project was released to the public. Intended to raise awareness of Mi'kmaq history, the atlas was developed over five years and contains over 1,500 place-names of Mi'kmaq origin. The Mi'kmaw linguist Bernie Francis contributed to the atlas throughout its development, alongside Trudy Sable, the Director of Aboriginal and Northern Research at the Gorsebrook Research Institute at Saint Mary's University.

=== Commercial and arbitrary ===
There are some arbitrary place-names in Nova Scotia which stand out from the rest. The community of Eureka was named by the Eureka Mining Company, while the Nova Scotia Steel and Coal Company gave the name Ferrona to their pig iron site. Imperoyal in the Halifax Regional Municipality is named for the Imperial Oil Company refinery established there. In Cape Breton, the coal-mining town of Donkin was named for a Dominion Coal Company manager. Nearby, the community of Florence was named for the wife of Daniel Duncan McKenzie, Member of Parliament for North Cape Breton and Victoria.

=== Biblical ===
The Bible is the source of a variety of place-names in Nova Scotia, reflecting the Christian faith of settlers; the village of Bible Hill is a prominent example. There is also a Paradise to be found, bordering Devil's Corner; as well as Nineveh and Canaan, named for places in the Bible. Garden of Eden in Antigonish County, another biblical name, is located not far from St. Pauls.

Some of these biblical names have since been rescinded. The town of Shelburne was once known as New Jerusalem, and the community of Sodom in Inverness County was renamed to Ashville in 1875.

== Characteristics ==
=== Duplicate place-names ===
There are 78 duplicated place-names in Nova Scotia, amounting to a total of 178 communities. The most common place-names are Pleasant Valley and Centreville; there are five communities by those names.

Other place-names with multiple duplicates are Brooklyn, Mount Pleasant, Little Harbour, Riverside, and Greenfield, of which there are four instances each. One notable duplicate is Cole Harbour in Guysborough County, which may be confused for the more well-known Cole Harbour in the Halifax Regional Municipality.

In the early 20th century, duplication of place-names was increasingly of concern in Nova Scotia. During this time, a considerable number of lakes named Mud Lake, Trout Lake and Long Lake were renamed, usually without consultation. Of these, 45 Mud Lakes, 23 Trout Lakes and 59 Long Lakes remain in Nova Scotia.

Repetitious place-names of a descriptive nature are also quite common. There are 130 toponyms in Nova Scotia containing the word "Green", including 25 places named Green Island.

=== Qualifying adjectives ===
It is very common but not unique to Nova Scotia to apply the same name to multiple communities in one area, with the addition of qualifying adjectives. For example, Pubnico refers to seven settlements around the Pubnico Harbour: Lower West Pubnico, Middle West Pubnico, Upper West Pubnico, Pubnico Head, Upper East Pubnico, Middle East Pubnico, and Lower East Pubnico. Judique has particularly interesting variations, with settlements including Judique North, Judique South, Judique Intervale, Rear of Judique South, Rear of Judique Chapel, Little Judique, and Rear of Little Judique.

=== Possessive apostrophes ===
Very few toponyms in Nova Scotia make use of the possessive apostrophe. According to CBC News, only four of roughly 2,300 official place-names in the province had a possessive apostrophe as of 2018. They include the town of Clark's Harbour, the Mi'kmaq reserve of Fisher's Grant, the Municipality of the District of St. Mary's, and the village of St. Peter's.

There is no rule against the use of a possessive apostrophe in toponyms, however their use was discouraged by a 1963 policy from the Geographic Names Board of Canada. This policy was likely influenced by that of the U.S. Geological Survey, which had a rule against apostrophes since the 1930s.

== See also ==
- Geography of Nova Scotia
- List of communities in Nova Scotia
- List of villages in Nova Scotia
- List of towns in Nova Scotia
- List of municipalities in Nova Scotia
- List of counties in Nova Scotia
