= HMS Plumper (1848) =

Sloop of the Royal Navy

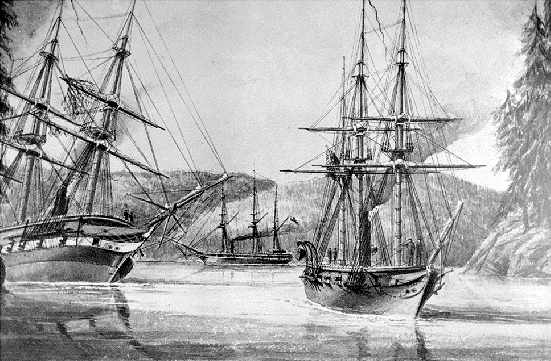
- HMS Plumper (right), with HMS Termagant (left) and HMS Alert (background) at Esquimalt in the late 1850s

History

United Kingdom
- Name: HMS Plumper
- Ordered: 25 April 1847; Re-ordered 12 August 1847
- Builder: Portsmouth dockyard
- Cost: £20,446
- Laid down: October 1847
- Launched: 5 April 1848
- Commissioned: 17 December 1848
- Fate: Sold for breaking 2 June 1865

General characteristics
- Type: Screw sloop
- Displacement: 577 tons
- Tons burthen: 490 24/94 bm
- Length: 140 ft 0 in (42.7 m) gundeck, 121 ft 10.5 in (37.1 m) Keel for tonnage
- Beam: 27 ft 10 in (8.5 m) maximum, 27 ft 6 in (8.4 m) for tonnage
- Draught: 11 ft 4 1/2 in (3.5 m) mean
- Depth of hold: 14 ft 6 in (4.4 m)
- Installed power: 148 ihp (110 kW)
- Propulsion: 2-cylinder vertical single-expansion steam engine; Single screw
- Sail plan: Barque rig
- Speed: 7.4 kn (13.7 km/h) under power
- Complement: 100
- Armament: As built: 8 guns: 2 × 32-pdr (56cwt) muzzle-loading smooth-bore guns; 6 × 32-pdr (25cwt) muzzle-loading smooth-bore guns; From October 1856: 12 guns

HMS Plumper was part of the 1847 programme, she was ordered on 25 April as a steam schooner from Woolwich Dockyard with the name Pincher. However, the reference Ships of the Royal Navy, by J.J. College, (c) 2020 there is no entry that associates this name to this build. The vessel was reordered on 12 August as an 8-gun sloop as designed by John Fincham, Master Shipwright at Portsmouth. Launched in 1848, she served three commissions, firstly on the West Indies and North American Station, then on the West Africa Station and finally in the Pacific Station. It was during her last commission as a survey ship that she left her most enduring legacy; in charting the west coast of British Columbia she left her name and those of her ship's company scattered across the charts of the region. She paid off for the last time in 1861 and was finally sold for breaking up in 1865.

Plumper was the fifth named vessel since it was introduced for a 12-gun vessel launched by Randall of Rotherhithe on 17 May 1794 and sold in January 1802.

== Construction ==
Plumper's keel was laid in October 1847 at Portsmouth Dockyard and launched on 5 April 1848. Her gundeck was 140 ft 0 in (42.7 m) with her keel length reported for tonnage calculation of 121 ft 10.5 in (37.1 m). Her maximum breadth was 27 ft 10 in (8.5 m) reported for tonnage was 27 ft 6 in (8.4 m). She had a depth of hold of 14 ft 6 in (4.4 m). Her builder's measure tonnage was 490 tons and displaced 577 tons. Her mean draught was 11 ft 4.5 in (3.5 m).

Her machinery was supplied by Miller, Ravenhill & Company. She shipped two rectangular fire tube boilers. Her engine was a 2-cylinder vertical single expansion (VSE) oscillating steam engine with cylinders of 27 in (685.8 mm) in diameter with a 24 in (609.6 mm) stroke, rated at 60 nominal horsepower (NHP). She had a single screw propeller of 9 ft (2.7 m) in diameter.

Her main armament consisted of two Blomefield 32-pounder 56 hundredweight (cwt) muzzle loading smooth bore (MLSB) 9.5-foot solid shot guns and six Blomefield (bored up from 18-pounders) 32-pounder 25 cwt MLSB 6-foot solid shot guns on broadside trucks.

=== Trials ===
During steam trials her engine generated 148 indicated horsepower (IHP) for a speed of 7.4 knots.

Plumper was completed for sea on 17 December 1848 at a cost of £20,446.

== Commissioned service ==
=== First commission (1848–1853) ===
She was commissioned on 6 November 1848 under Commander Matthew S. Nolloth, RN for Particular Service with Admiral Sir Charles Napier's Western Squadron. In January 1849, she was sent to the North America and West Indies Station. Curiously, a report was published in the Illustrated London News on 14 April 1849 of a sighting of a sea serpent off the Portuguese Coast.

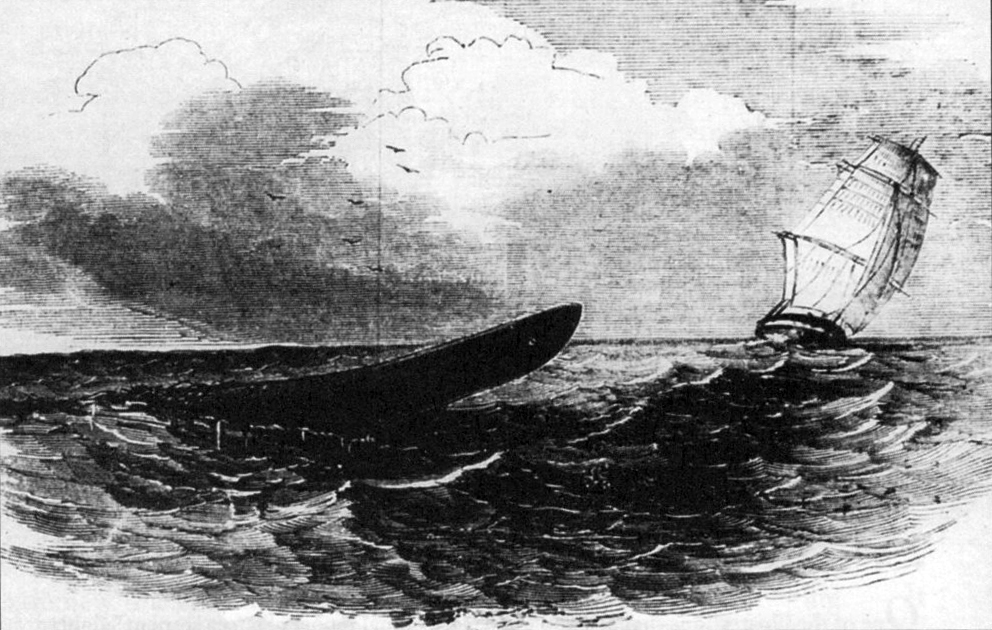
Supposed Appearance of the Great Sea-Serpent, From H.M.S. Plumper, Sketched by an Officer on Board, Illustrated London News, 14 April 1849

On the morning of the 31st December, 1848, in lat. 41° 13'N., and long. 12° 31'W., being nearly due west of Oporto, I saw a long black creature with a sharp head, moving slowly, I should think about two knots ... its back was about twenty feet if not more above water; and its head, as near as I could judge, from six to eight...There was something on its back that appeared like a mane, and, as it moved through the water, kept washing about; but before I could examine it more closely, it was too far astern

— "A Naval Officer"

On 25 June 1850, she ran aground and was damaged off Digby, Nova Scotia, British North America. She was refloated and taken in to Digby for repairs. In June 1851, she deployed to the south-east coast of America and during this period she captured the slavers Flor-do-Mar on 14 June 1851 and Sarah on 9 June 1851 (with HMS Cormorant).

She is recorded as arriving in Portsmouth from Brazil with 6,370 troy ounces (198 kg) of gold trans-shipped from the Emperor on 31 December 1852. She paid off at Portsmouth on 6 January 1853.

=== Second commission (1853–1856) ===
After a short refit she recommissioned at Portsmouth under Commander John A.L. Wharton, RN on 1 August 1853 for service on the West Coast of Africa. At the time, the West Africa Squadron was employed overwhelmingly in anti-slavery patrols. She changed commanders on 5 April 1855 when Commander William H. Haswell took command. The London Gazette records the capture of a slaving vessel of unknown name by Plumper on 19 October 1855. By October 1856, her gun armament was increased to 12 guns. She returned to Home Waters paying off at Portsmouth on 9 December 1856.

=== Third commission (1857–1861) ===
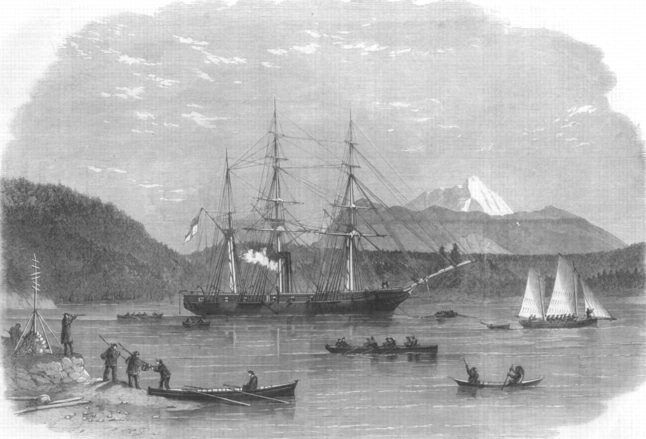
HMS Plumper at Port Harvey, Vancouver Island from a drawing by E P Bedwell

She was recommissioned at Portsmouth on 10 December 1856 under Captain George Henry Richards, RN for service on the Pacific Coast of British North America as a survey ship. During her tenure there she surveyed the lower Fraser River, Burrard Inlet, Howe Sound, Sunshine Coast and the waters around Esquimalt and Victoria on Vancouver's Island. The Plumper, having embarked a company of Royal Marines, was involved in the Pig War crisis between the United States and Britain in 1859; along with Tribune, which was commanded by Captain Geoffrey Hornby, the Plumper and HMS Satellite were dispatched by Governor James Douglas to prevent American soldiers from erecting fortifications on San Juan Island and bringing in reinforcements.

Francis Brockton was the ship's engineer under Captain Richards when, in 1859, Brockton found a vein of coal in the Vancouver area. After the discovery, which Richards reported to Governor James Douglas, Richards named the area of the find Coal Harbour and named Brockton Point, at the east end of what is now Stanley Park in Vancouver, after Francis Brockton.

Commander Anthony Hoskins brought HMS Hecate out to the Pacific Station and swapped commands with Richards, taking command of the Plumper in January 1861. He then returned to the United Kingdom, paying the ship off at Portsmouth on 2 July 1861.

== Disposal ==
Plumper was sold to White of Cowes for breaking on 2 June 1865.

== Legacy ==
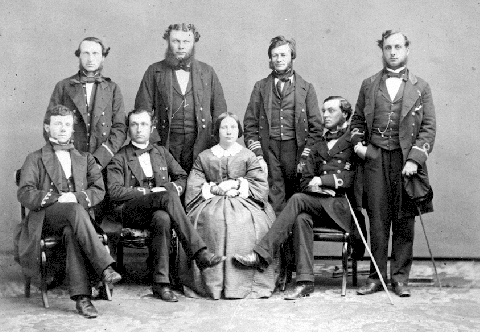
The officers of HMS Plumper Standing: Dr David Lyall, Paymaster W H J Brown, Capt Richards, Master Daniel Pender; Seated: Master E P Bedwell, Lt Mayne, Mrs Mary Richards, Lt W Moriarity (December 1860)

Several significant features of the coast of British Columbia are named after Plumper, including Plumper Sound in the Southern Gulf Islands region of British Columbia and Plumper Cove at Keats Island (from which Plumper Cove Marine Provincial Park takes its name). Other features were named after the ship's company, including:

- Campbell River, British Columbia, for Dr Samuel Campbell, the ship's surgeon.
- Pender Island and Pender Harbour, British Columbia, for Daniel Pender.
- Mayne Island for Lieutenant Richard Charles Mayne.
- Brockton Point for the ship's engineer, Francis Brockton.
- Mudge Island for William Fitzwilliam Mudge, a ship's officer.

An image of the ship appears on the coat-of-arms of the town of Sidney on southern Vancouver Island.
