= Keats Island (British Columbia) =

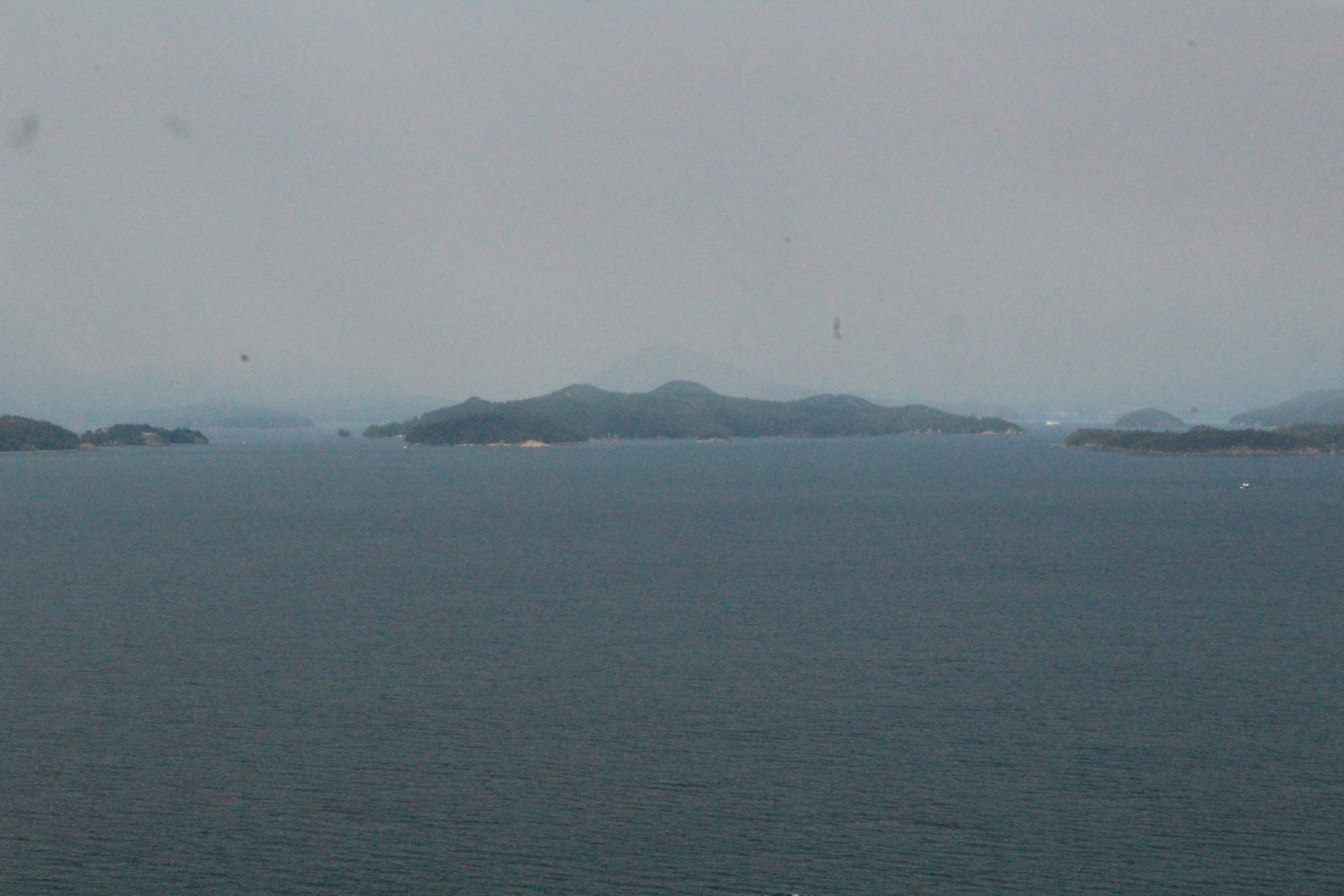
- Keats Island (centre) from the BC Ferry
- Interactive map of Keats Island
- Coordinates: 49°24′N 123°27′W
- Country: Canada
- Province: British Columbia
- Region: Howe Sound

Area
  - Total: 6 km^{2} (2.3 sq mi)
  - Land: 6 km^{2} (2.3 sq mi)
- Elevation: 242 m (794 ft)
- Time zone: UTC−8 (PST)
  - Summer (DST): UTC−7 (PDT)
- Area codes: 604, 778

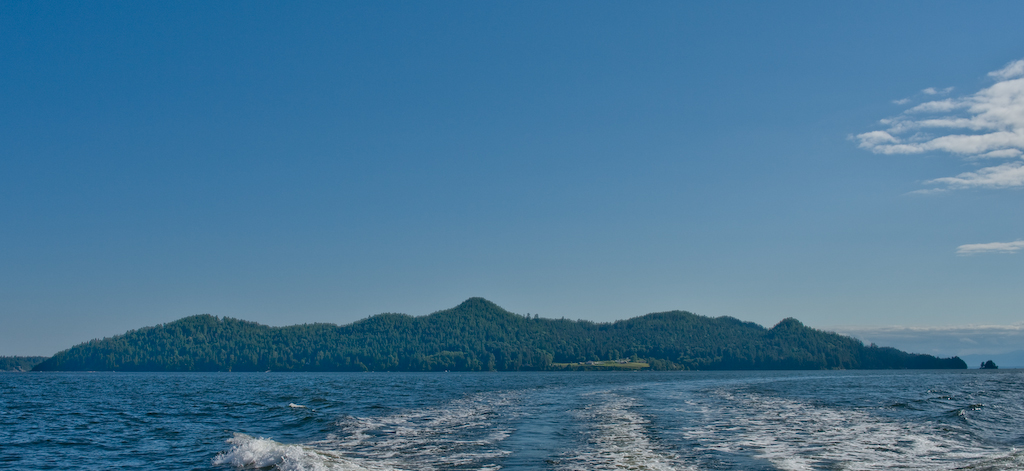
Keats Island from the north.

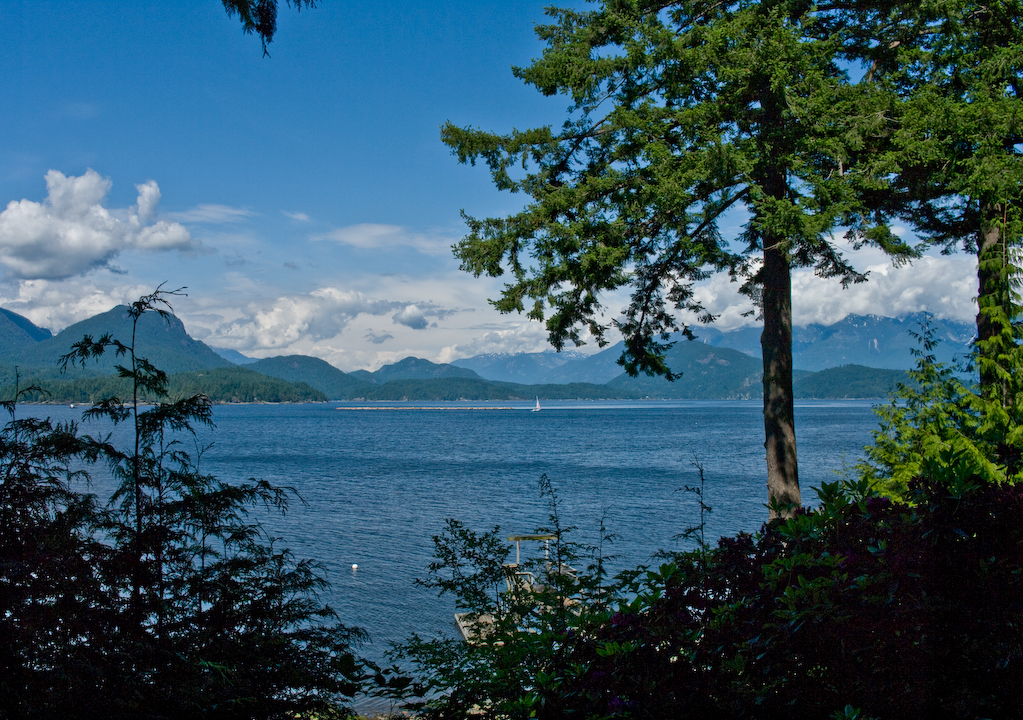
The view north from Keats Island, including Gambier island.

Keats Island is an inhabited island located in Howe Sound near Vancouver, British Columbia. Most people who spend time on the island are visitors to one of the camps or the Marine Park, or owners of seasonal cottages.

== Physical geography, settlements and climate ==
Keats Island is one of the larger islands in Howe Sound, located offshore from the community of Gibsons on the Sunshine Coast and directly west of Bowen Island. The island is part of West Howe Sound, Electoral Area F within the Sunshine Coast Regional District (SCRD) in British Columbia, Canada.

Other than a few cleared fields, the entire island is covered in forest. There are several beaches scattered around the island, and a prominent rocky outcrop called Salmon Rock at the Southwest tip.

== Name ==
Keats Island's Indigenous name is Lheḵ’tínes.

Like many of the features in Howe Sound, Keats Island was named by George Henry Richards, who surveyed the British Columbia Coast from 1857 to 1862, first in HMS Plumper (which is commemorated by the name of Plumper Cove) until 1861, and then in HMS Hecate. Keats Island is named after Sir Richard Goodwin Keats, a British Admiral. Admiral Keats served under Horatio Nelson, 1st Viscount Nelson and was famous for sailing HMS Superb through a blockade at Gibraltar in 1801 during the Napoleonic Wars. In 1813 Admiral Keats was also a governor of the Island of Newfoundland. Keats Island is the only large island in Howe Sound named for an officer who did not take part in the Battle of Trafalgar, as his ship was undergoing refit at the time. However, he had already established his fame in the Second Battle of Algeciras.

== Settlement and services ==
Residential development on Keats Island is mostly summer cabins. Most residents shop and obtain other services in Gibsons, the nearest town of any size. In 2002, the Islands Trust stated that there were 50 to 80 full-time island residents, and that the number of part-time residents was around 900, excluding the 350 or so visitors to Barnabas and Keats Camps and the Marine Park.

The communities on Keats Island are clustered around the two government wharves: Keats Landing on the west coast, facing Gibsons and having a view of Shoal Channel separating the island from the mainland, and the larger community of Eastbourne located on the southeast shore. In addition, Plumper Cove extends along the west shore of the island from Freeman's Bluff (just north of the government wharf at Keats Landing) to Plumper Cove Marine Provincial Park, and Melody Point is on the northwest tip of the island, facing Langdale on the mainland.

Keats Camps is a Baptist summer camp, founded in 1926 on the site of a former orchard, operated on 93 hectares of land on the west part of the island. Keats Landing grew up around the camp, on lots leased from the Baptist Convention of British Columbia. Because the majority of the island's summer visitors are Christians, Keats Camps hosts public churches on Sundays for the whole island and the campers of Keats Camps.

Barnabas Family Ministries is a Christian camp and retreat centre operated on 64 hectares on the north side of the island. This land was formerly owned by the Corkum family, and was referred to as "Corky's Farm". It is now owned by Barnabas.

== Access ==
Visitors to Keats Island can take a BC Ferry vessel from Horseshoe Bay north of Vancouver to Langdale Ferry Terminal on the Sunshine Coast. Keats Island and nearby Gambier Island are served by foot passenger ferry from the ferry terminal at Langdale, and Keats is accessible by water taxi from Gibsons and Horseshoe Bay. For years, transportation to Keats was served from Langdale by the small passenger ferry Dogwood Princess and is now served by the ferry Stormaway. Visitors may also drive from Langdale to Gibsons and take a water taxi to Keats Landing.

Many visitors alternatively come via water taxi. There are several companies who service Keats Island, though the primary one with regularly scheduled runs is Mercury Water Taxi.

There are a few rough roads connecting locations on the island, and most owners have a golf cart or truck to get around, which needs to be barged in as there is no car ferry to the island.

== Marine Park ==
Plumper Cove Marine Provincial Park, one of the oldest marine parks in BC, is a popular overnight destination for boats from nearby Gibsons and Vancouver.
