= Daniel Pender =

Royal Navy staff commander

Captain Daniel Pender
- Allegiance: United Kingdom
- Branch: Royal Navy
- Rank: Captain

Daniel Pender was a Royal Navy Staff Commander, later captain, who surveyed the Coast of British Columbia aboard HMS Plumper, HMS Hecate and Beaver from 1857 to 1870.

Pender was recorded as the second master of the admiralty survey vessel, HMS Plumper, in 1857 when he arrived at Esquimalt. He was promoted as the ship's master in 1860. He was, however, transferred to HMS Hecate a year later after the Plumper was deemed too small and unsuitable for the coast's waters. When the British government commissioned the Hudson Bay Company to continue the hydraulic survey of the coast, he was given command of the company's Beaver. He replaced Captain George Henry Richards, who was recalled to Britain after he was appointed as the Hydrographer of the Royal Navy.
