= Irvine's Landing =

Coordinates: 49.632°N 124.057°W

Irvines Landing was the first post-contact settlement in the ḵalpilin (Pender Harbour) area, and quickly became a hub for supplies and provisions. The first settler in Pender Harbour was an English immigrant named Charles Irvine, who established a small trading post in 1865. Steve Dames, a displaced seaman from Riga, Latvia, and Joe Perry of Cape Verde became familiar with Irvines Landing, and purchased it in 1898. Perry's father-in-law, Joseph Gonsalves of Madeira Island, later moved up from Brockton Point (now Stanley Park in Vancouver). Under the name Gonsalves and Dames General Traders, they expanded their holdings and built the Irvines Landing Hotel and Store. An early Union Steamer stop for settlers and loggers, it grew into a fish-processing centre and later a yacht anchorage and vacation spot. Often referred to as Irvine's Landing, the official name has no apostrophe according to the BC Geographical Names service, Irvines Landing. This is in keeping with the convention established in the late 1800s of removing apostrophes from place names in Canada.
