= Pender Harbour, British Columbia =

Pender Harbour (ḵalpilin)
- Harbour
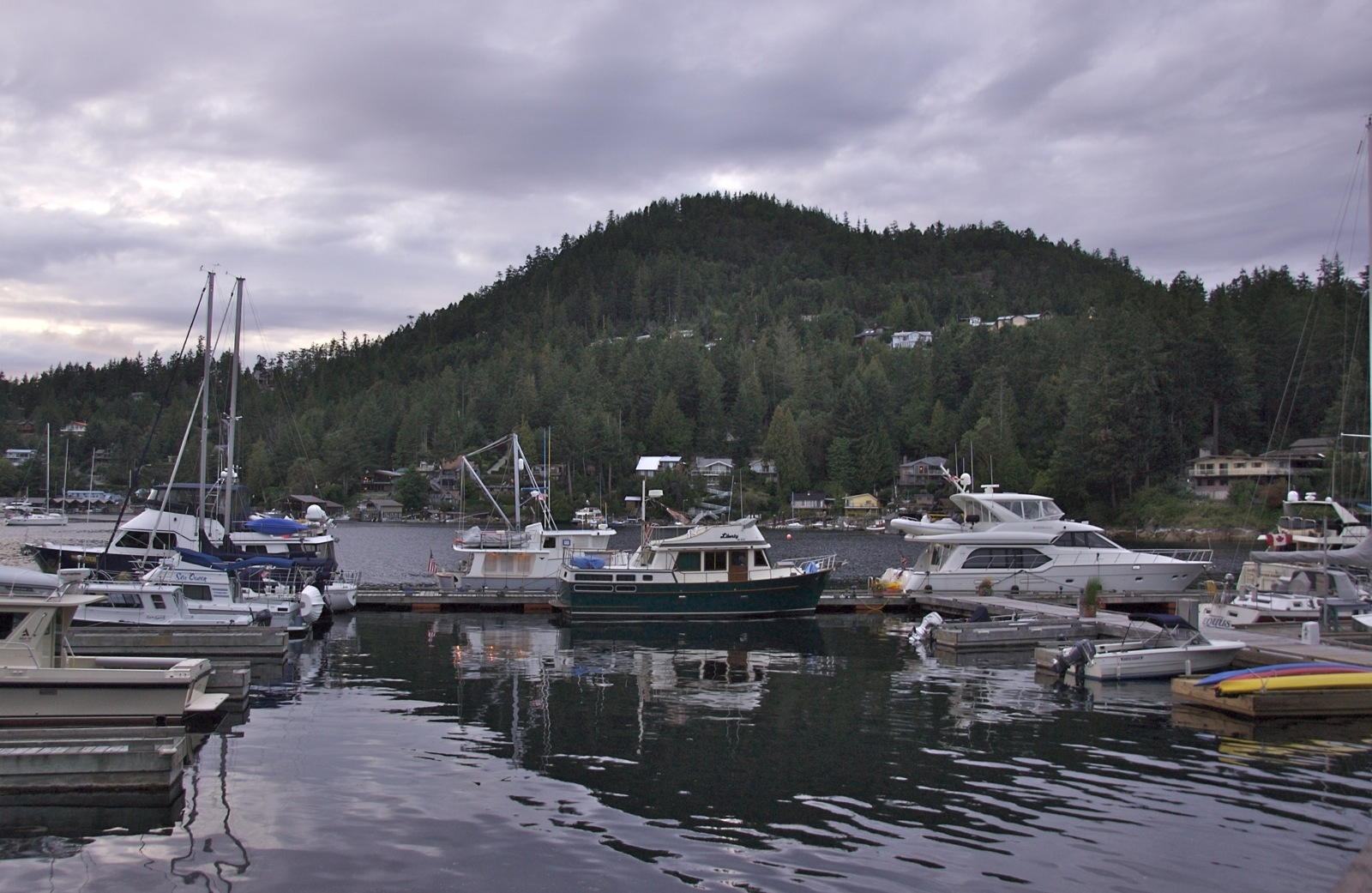
- Nickname: Venice of the North
- Location of Pender Harbour in British Columbia
- Coordinates: 49°37′30″N 124°02′00″W
- Country: Canada
- Province: British Columbia
- Postal codes: V0N-1S0, V0N-1S1
- Area codes: 604, 778
- Website: http://www.penderharbour.ca

Pender Harbour (ḵalpilin in she shashishalhem) is a harbour on British Columbia's Sunshine Coast, on the east side of Malaspina Strait. The name Pender Harbour also refers collectively to the surrounding unincorporated communities of Madeira Park, Kleindale, Irvines Landing, and Garden Bay, within the Sunshine Coast Regional District (SCRD).

The harbour itself is an amalgam of bays and coves that encroach inland for 5 kilometres (3.1 mi) and provide over 60 kilometres (37 mi) of shoreline. Once a shíshálh village site, steamer stop, a fishing village, and a logging and medical waypoint, it is now home to a population of under 3,000, with over 40% of property owners being non-resident (one of them Joni Mitchell, since the early 1970s).

Tourism is an important part of the local economy. The area has an arts community and several annual music festivals. It hosts the second-oldest May Day celebration in British Columbia and the biggest and longest-running downhill longboard race in Canada, Attack of Danger Bay.

== Name origin ==
The name "Pender Harbour" was given in 1860 by Captain G.H. Richards of the Royal Navy, in honour of Daniel Pender. Pender arrived on the coast as second master of the survey vessel HMS Plumper on 9 November 1857. He later served as master of the Plumper and the Hecate, and commander of the Beaver (hired from the Hudson's Bay Company for hydrographic work) from 1863–1870. He was subsequently an assistant at the Hydrographic Office in London from 1871–1884.

== History ==
Prior to European contact, ḵalpilin (Pender Harbour) was one of the most populous and powerful regions in the shíshálh swiya (world, "territory"). Several villages shared the well-protected home sites and productive harvest locations of the harbour, including sex̱wʔamin (Garden Bay), p’ukwp’akwem (Bargain Harbour), salalus (Madeira Park), smishalin (Kleindale), and kwayahkuhlohss (Myer’s Creek).

In political and economic terms, the village of sex̱wʔamin, could be considered one of the most important residential locations of the shíshálh Nation. It was a year-round village that, by virtue of its location, served as the gateway to transportation corridors on sinkwu (Georgia Strait and Malaspina Strait) and lekw'emin (Jervis Inlet) via lilkw'emin (Agamemnon Channel). Together with the village of klayahkwohss (Buccaneer Bay) on sx̱welap (Thormanby Island) to the south, it also served as a primary location for winter dances and ceremonials.

With the increase in European settlement in ḵalpilin (Pender Harbour) during the early 20th century, many resident shíshálh were forced to move to sexaliten (Skardon Islands), the small islets at the harbour entrance with no access to fresh water.

== See also ==
- Francis Point Provincial Park
