= List of Canadian provincial and territorial name etymologies =

This article lists the etymologies of the names of the provinces and territories of Canada.

== Provinces and territories ==
Name	Language of origin	Word(s) in original language	Meaning and notes
Alberta	Latin (ultimately from Proto-Germanic)		Feminine Latinized form of Albert, ultimately from the Proto-Germanic *Aþalaberhtaz (compound of "noble" + "bright/famous"), after Princess Louisa Caroline Alberta
British Columbia	Latin		Referring to the British sector of the Columbia District, after the Columbia River, ultimately after the Columbia Rediviva, a reference to Christopher Columbus
Manitoba	Cree, Ojibwe. or Assiniboine	manitou-wapow, manidoobaa, or minnetoba	"Straits of Manitou, the Great Spirit" or "Lake of the Prairie", after Lake Manitoba
New Brunswick	German (ultimately from Low German)	Brunswiek	Combination of Bruno and wik, referring to a place where merchants rested and stored their goods
Newfoundland and Labrador	Portuguese	Terra Nova and Lavrador	"New land", and the surname of João Fernandes Lavrador, meaning "farmer" or "plower"
Northwest Territories	English		Referring to the territory's position relative to Rupert's Land
Nova Scotia	Latin		"New Scotland", referring to the country Scotland, derived from the Latin Scoti, the term applied to Gaels
Nunavut	Inuktitut		Nunavut means "Our land" in the Inuit language
Ontario	Iroquoian, Wyandot	Ontarí꞉io or Skanadario	"Great lake" or "beautiful water", after Lake Ontario
Prince Edward Island	English (ultimately from Old English)		After Prince Edward, Duke of Kent and Strathearn, ultimately from the Anglo-Saxon ead "wealth, fortune; prosperous" and weard "guardian, protector"
Quebec	Algonquin, Mi'kmaq, Ojibwe	kébec	"Where the river narrows", referring to the narrowing of the Saint Lawrence River at Quebec City
Saskatchewan	Cree	kisiskāciwani-sīpiy	"Swift-flowing river", after the Saskatchewan River
Yukon	Gwichʼin	chųų gąįį han	"White water river", after the Yukon River

== Historical regions ==
- Acadia (French: Acadie): origin disputed:
  1. Credited to Florentine navigator Giovanni da Verrazzano, who first named a region around Chesapeake Bay Archadia (Arcadia) in 1524 because of "the beauty of its trees", according to his diary. Cartographers began using the name Arcadia to refer to areas progressively farther north until it referred to the French holdings in maritime Canada (particularly Nova Scotia). The -r- also began to disappear from the name on early maps, resulting in the current Acadia.
  2. Possibly derived from the Míkmaq word akatik, pronounced roughly "agadik", meaning "place", which French-speakers spelled as -cadie in place names such as Shubenacadie and Tracadie, possibly coincidentally.
- District of Keewatin: Algonquian roots—either kīwēhtin (ᑮᐍᐦᑎᐣ) in Cree or giiwedin (ᑮᐌᑎᓐ) in Ojibwe—both of which mean 'north wind' in their respective languages.
- Nunatsiavut: Inuktitut, meaning "our beautiful land".

== See also ==
- Locations in Canada with an English name
- List of Canadian place names of Ukrainian origin
- List of place names in Canada of Aboriginal origin
- List of etymologies of administrative divisions
- Name of Canada
- Origins of names of cities in Canada
- Scottish place names in Canada
- Toponymy of Nova Scotia
