= Little Harbour =

Little Harbour may refer to:

- Little Harbour, Nova Scotia (disambiguation), several places
- Little Harbour, Newfoundland and Labrador, a drive-through community of about 15 families in Newfoundland and Labrador, Canada.
- Little Harbour (Gander Lake), Gander, Newfoundland and Labrador, Canada
- Little Harbour (Woody Point), Newfoundland and Labrador, Canada
- Little Harbour, Abaco, Bahamas
