= Francis Peninsula =

Tidal island in British Columbia

Francis Peninsula French: Péninsule Francis
- Tidal island
- Interactive map of Francis Peninsula
- Coordinates: 49°35′50″N 124°00′58″W
- Location: Madeira Park, British Columbia
- Part of: Northern Gulf Islands

Area
  - Total: 3.8 km^{2} (1.5 mi^{2})
- Topo map: NTS 92F9 Texada Island

Francis Peninsula, also known as Beaver Island, is a tidal island located on the west coast of the Sechelt Peninsula in British Columbia, Canada.

== Etymology ==
The designation Francis Peninsula was officially adopted by BC Geographical Names in 1930. The name was changed to Beaver Island on 28 July 1945 as identified on British Admiralty Charts. BC Geographical Names reverted the name back to Francis Peninsula on 4 April 1972 in order to conform with its entrenched local usage.

== Geography ==
Francis Peninsula forms the southern part of Pender Harbour. During high and neap tide, the peninsula is divided from the mainland by Bargain Narrows (an arm of Pender Harbour) and Bargain Bay. During low tide, the island rejoins the mainland to become a peninsula. A two-lane road connects the island to the mainland via a short bridge.

The island features two protected areas: Francis Point Provincial Park and Francis Point Ecological Reserve.

== See also ==
- Micou's Island
