= Lorne Reid =

Canadian football player

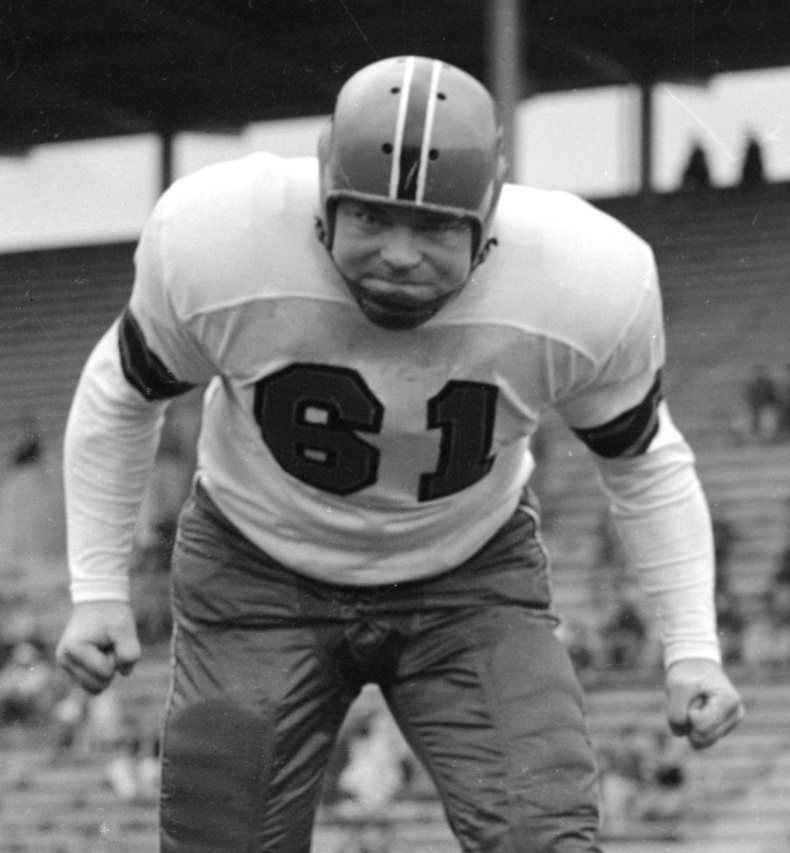
- Reid in 1954

No. 61
- Positions: Tackle, Guard

Personal information
- Born: January 20, 1929; Saskatoon, Saskatchewan, Canada
- Died: March 29, 1975 (aged 46); Pender Harbour, British Columbia, Canada
- Listed height: 6 ft 2 in (1.88 m)
- Listed weight: 250 lb (113 kg)

Career history
- 1954–1957: BC Lions
- 1958–1961: Calgary Stampeders

Lorne Brock Reid (January 20, 1929 – March 29, 1975) was a Canadian professional football player who played for the BC Lions and Calgary Stampeders. He played junior football in Vancouver. He died of a heart attack in 1975.
