= Francis Brockton =

Francis Brockton was the ship's engineer of HMS Plumper under Captain Henry Richards when, in 1859, Brockton found a vein of coal in the Vancouver area. After the discovery, which Richards reported to Governor James Douglas, Richards named the area of the find Coal Harbour and named Brockton Point, at the east end of what is now Stanley Park in Vancouver, after the engineer.
