= Thomas J. Brown (writer) =

Canadian writer (1867–1926)

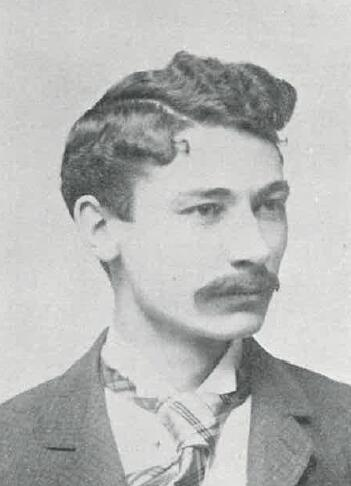
- Born: Thomas James Brown; 21 January 1867; Sydney Mines, Nova Scotia, Canada
- Died: 8 May 1926 (aged 59); Halifax, Nova Scotia, Canada
- Other name: T. J. Brown
- Occupations: Mining official; author
- Notable work: Place-Names of the Province of Nova Scotia (1922)
- Spouse: Matilda Livingstone (m. 1893)
- Children: 10

Signature
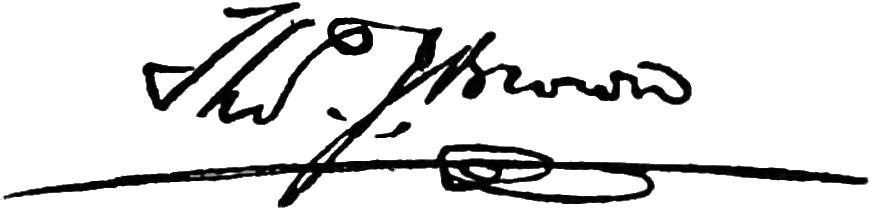

Thomas James Brown (21 January 1867 – 8 May 1926) was a Canadian mining official who served as the Deputy Minister of Mines in Nova Scotia from 1922 until his death in 1926. He is remembered as the author of Place-Names of the Province of Nova Scotia (1922), the first study exclusively dedicated to Nova Scotian place-names.

== Biography ==
Thomas J. Brown was born on 21 January 1867 in Sydney Mines, Nova Scotia, to parents James and Margaret Brown (née Stevens). The son of an engineer, Brown began working in the offices of the General Mining Association at the age of 12. After this, he worked as a fan boy in the mines he later managed, opening and closing doors to facilitate proper air flow. He married Matilda Livingstone on 23 November 1893 in Sydney Mines, with whom he had ten children; nine of their children lived into adulthood.

Brown moved to Barrachois where he became employed by the Lingan Mining Company as a paymaster, becoming a manager of the company in 1894. He managed a variety of mines in Cape Breton during this time. In 1901, Brown was appointed as the resident manager for the operations of the Nova Scotia Steel and Coal Company in Sydney Mines. By 1902, he was managing all of the company's mines.

Following an explosion at the mine in Florence in 1911, Brown was responsible for having the funerals of the men killed paid for by the company. He became the president of the Indian Cove Coal Company in 1920, following the merger of the Nova Scotia Steel and Coal Company and the Dominion Iron and Steel Company.

Brown was appointed as the Deputy Minister of Mines in Nova Scotia in 1922. He was an effective mediator and well-respected in this position by miners and company officials alike. Brown considered it "unpatriotic" to purchase foreign coal, and called on Nova Scotians to purchase their coal from local suppliers. He served as Deputy Minister until his death; while he tried to retire in 1925, he died before a replacement could be found. In 1924, Brown was nominated for president of the Nova Scotia Mining Society. The following year, he served as general secretary for the Commission on Maritime Claims, established in response to the Maritime Rights Movement.

Brown died on 8 May 1926 at the Victoria General Hospital in Halifax, Nova Scotia. His funeral took place on 11 May 1926 in Sydney Mines from his house on Purves Street to Brookside Cemetery, his place of burial.

== Publications ==
Described as a "coal miner with the soul of a poet", Brown was a collector of relics and Nova Scotian heritage. He was the author of the first study exclusively dedicated to the study of Nova Scotia place-names. Place-Names of the Province of Nova Scotia was published in 1922 by Royal Print & Litho., and remained the only work of its kind until the Public Archives of Nova Scotia published Place-Names and Places of Nova Scotia in 1967. The book was well-received at the time of its release, described as an "interesting" and "unique" volume. The Evening Mail stated that Brown "displayed a literary style that won for him the praise of some of Canada's most distinguished literary critics".

The original typewritten and annotated manuscript for Place-Names of the Province of Nova Scotia is held at the Beaton Institute, the archives of Cape Breton University.
