= Keats Landing =

Human settlement in Canada

Coordinates: 49.398°N 123.449°W

Location of Keats Landing in British Columbia

Keats Landing is a settlement on Keats Island in British Columbia. The settlement contains a wharf.
