= Place Names of Atlantic Canada =

1996 book by William B. Hamilton

- Author: William B. Hamilton
- Language: English
- Subject: Toponymy
- Genre: Non-fiction; reference work
- Publisher: University of Toronto Press
- Publication date: 1996
- Publication place: Canada
- Media type: Print
- Pages: 502
- ISBN: 978-0-8020-7570-3
- OCLC: 35940787
- Dewey Decimal: 917.15/003
- LC Class: F1035.8 .H36 1996

Place Names of Atlantic Canada is a 1996 non-fiction book by William B. Hamilton, former chair of the Toponymic Research Committee of the Canadian Permanent Committee on Geographic Names. The book covers the toponymy of the Atlantic provinces, with individual chapters on New Brunswick, Newfoundland and Labrador, Nova Scotia, and Prince Edward Island.

== Background ==
William B. Hamilton was a Canadian historian who was recognized as an authority on the study of toponymy. He served as chair of the Toponymic Research Committee of the Canadian Permanent Committee on Geographical Names, and was professor emeritus in the social science faculty at Mount Allison University.

Hamilton had a longtime fascination with maps, which inspired his studies of place-names. Place Names of Atlantic Canada was his third book, following The Macmillan Book of Canadian Place Names.

== Contents ==
Place Names of Atlantic Canada is a reference work on place-names in the Atlantic provinces, containing over 2,000 entries arranged by province in alphabetical order and illustrated with five maps. The book was the first to examine the toponymy of Atlantic Canada from a regional perspective, as opposed to works on individual provinces; it built upon previous studies by tracing the origins of underwater geographical features on the Grand Banks and off the coast of Nova Scotia.

The book comprises five chapters, in addition to a preface and bibliographical essay. The first chapter provides a general history of the region and the factors influencing its place-names, while the remaining four are dedicated to the place-names of each province: New Brunswick, Newfoundland and Labrador, Nova Scotia, and Prince Edward Island.

== Reception ==
Place Names of Atlantic Canada was well-received as an accessible and engaging reference work for both professional historians and casual readers. Intended as a general introduction to toponymy in the Atlantic provinces, the book also examines the foundations of society in the region, using place-names as a "window on history and culture". Hamilton himself described it as "a browser's book", stating that almost every reader will recognize one of the names within.

The book has been criticized for containing several errors regarding the origins of place-names in Newfoundland and Labrador, particularly for communities on the south coast. In addition to these mistakes, Hamilton also incorrectly claims that the Barbary pirates crossed the Atlantic, and that settlement was illegal in Newfoundland. The book contains some minor typographical errors, such as Shippegan being the main entry for Shippagan, and some incorrect dates; these errors do not significantly impact the overall quality of scholarship, and some mistakes are to be expected in a reference work of this size. William J. Kirwin notes in the journal Newfoundland Studies that the book makes significant use of the Encyclopedia of Newfoundland as a reference, which Kirwin states "too often cites conjecture or local traditions instead of references to early names on dated extant maps."

== See also ==
- Toponymy of Nova Scotia
