= William B. Hamilton =

Canadian historian (1929–2012)

William Baillie Hamilton FRSA (1929 – 5 November 2012) was a Canadian historian who was a professor at several schools including Mount Allison University's faculty of social sciences. He was the author of several books, most notably regarding toponymy in Canada.

== Biography ==
William B. Hamilton was born in 1929 to parents Allister Hamilton and Christene Baille. He grew up in Brule Point, Nova Scotia, graduating from Pictou Academy. He subsequently earned a Bachelor of Arts, Bachelor of Education, and Master of Arts from Mount Allison University and a PhD from the University of Western Ontario.

Hamilton was a Fellow of the Royal Society of Arts and a Fellow of the Royal Nova Scotia Historical Society, holding appointments across a variety of universities in Canada, the United Kingdom, and Australia. He retired from teaching in 1995, when he was named professor emeritus at Mount Allison University.

Recognized as an authority on place-names, Hamilton was a former chair of the Toponymic Research Committee of the Canadian Permanent Committee on Geographic Names. He wrote extensively on the topic across his career, with books including The Macmillan Book of Canadian Place Names and Place Names of Atlantic Canada.

Following retirement, Hamilton began writing as a freelance journalist, producing columns for the Sackville Tribune Post and the Saint John Telegraph Journal. He died on 5 November 2012 at the Sackville Memorial Hospital in New Brunswick.

== Publications ==
- Hamilton, William B. (1970). Education, Politics and Reform in Nova Scotia, 1800–1848 (Thesis). University of Western Ontario. OCLC 2986360.
- — (1974). Local History in Atlantic Canada. Toronto: Macmillan of Canada. ISBN 978-0-7705-1181-4.
- — (1978). The Macmillan Book of Canadian Place Names. Toronto: Macmillan of Canada. ISBN 978-0-7705-1524-9.
- — (1981). The Nova Scotia Traveller. Toronto: Macmillan of Canada. ISBN 978-0-7715-9578-3.
- — (1985). Regional Identity: A Maritime Quest. Sackville, N.S.: Centre for Canadian Studies, Mount Allison University. ISBN 978-0-8882-8044-2.
- — (1992). One County One World. Sackville, N.B.: [s.n.] ISBN 978-0-9194-8833-5.
- — (1996). Place Names of Atlantic Canada. Toronto: University of Toronto Press. ISBN 978-0-8020-7570-3.
- — (2004). At the Crossroads: A History of Sackville, New Brunswick. Kentville, N.S.: Gaspereau Press. ISBN 978-1-8940-3186-8.

== See also ==
- Toponymy of Nova Scotia
