= Brockton Point Lighthouse =

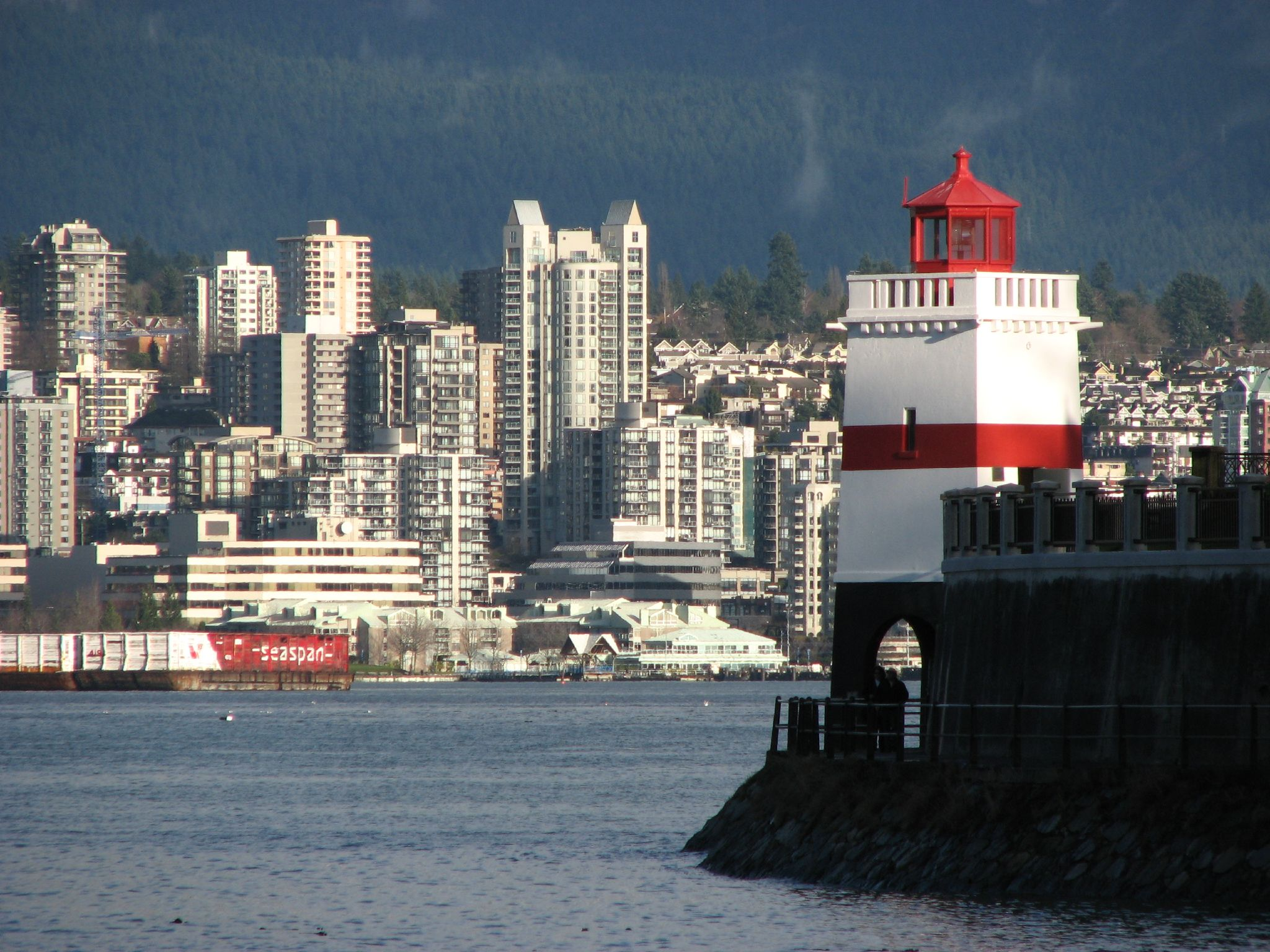
- Brockton Point lighthouse
- Location: Brockton Point; Vancouver; British Columbia; Canada
- Coordinates: 49.300917°N 123.117018°W

Tower
- Constructed: 1890 (first)
- Construction: masonry
- Automated: 1956
- Height: 10.6 metres (35 ft)
- Shape: quadrangular tower with balcony and lantern atop an arched basement
- Markings: white tower with a horizontal red band, red lantern
- Operator: City of Vancouver (Stanley Park)

Light
- First lit: 1915 (current)
- Deactivated: 2008

Brockton Point Lighthouse is located at Brockton Point in Stanley Park, Vancouver, British Columbia. The light was first established at the location in 1890. A square tower, painted white with a red horizontal stripe, was built in 1914. The lighthouse was designed by William P. Anderson and has a red lantern and an arched base with a walkway underneath. The light has been officially inactive since 2008 but may still be displayed occasionally for decorative purposes.

The site is owned by the Canadian Coast Guard and has been managed by the Vancouver Park Board since 2006.

== Gallery ==
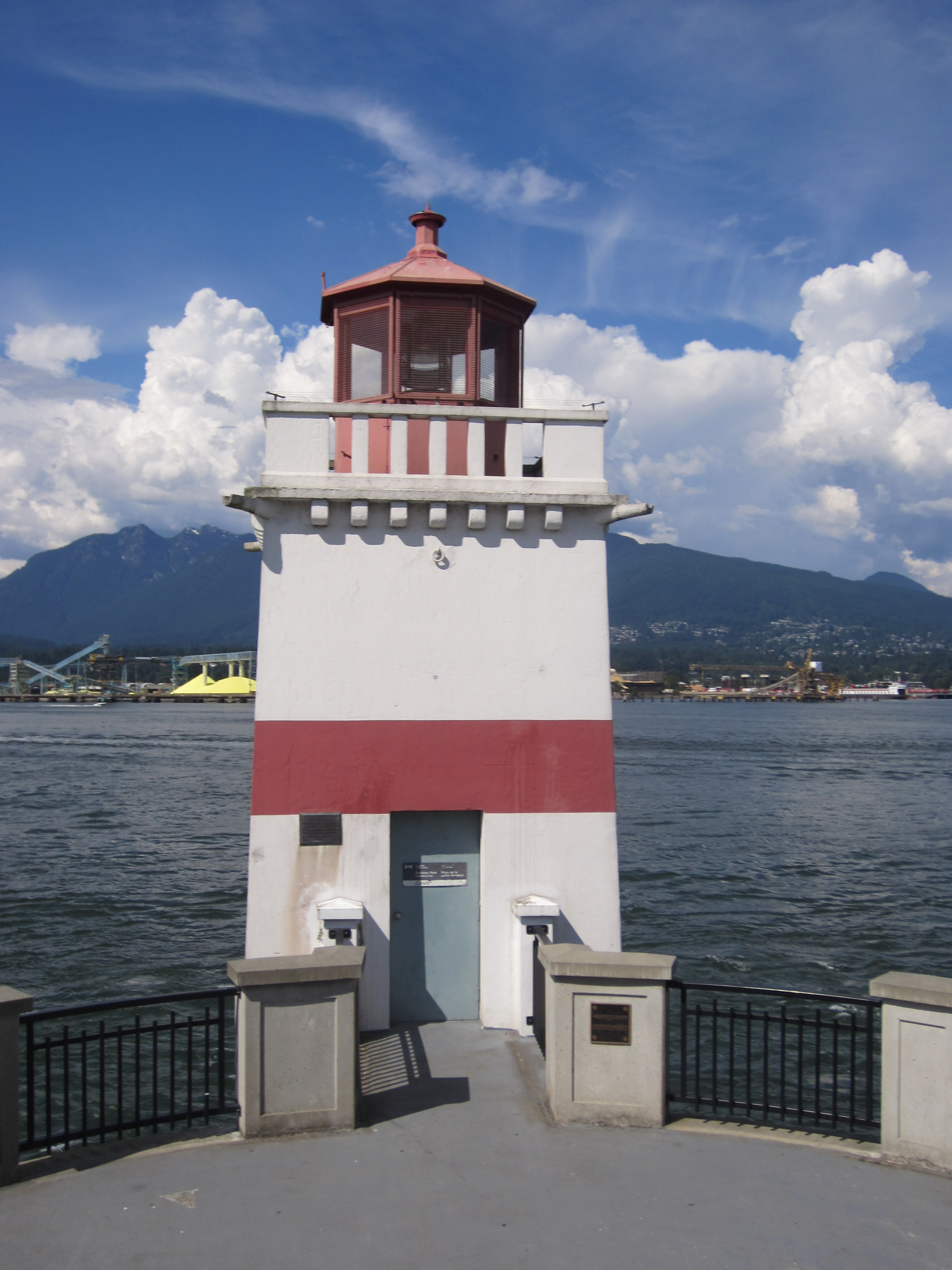

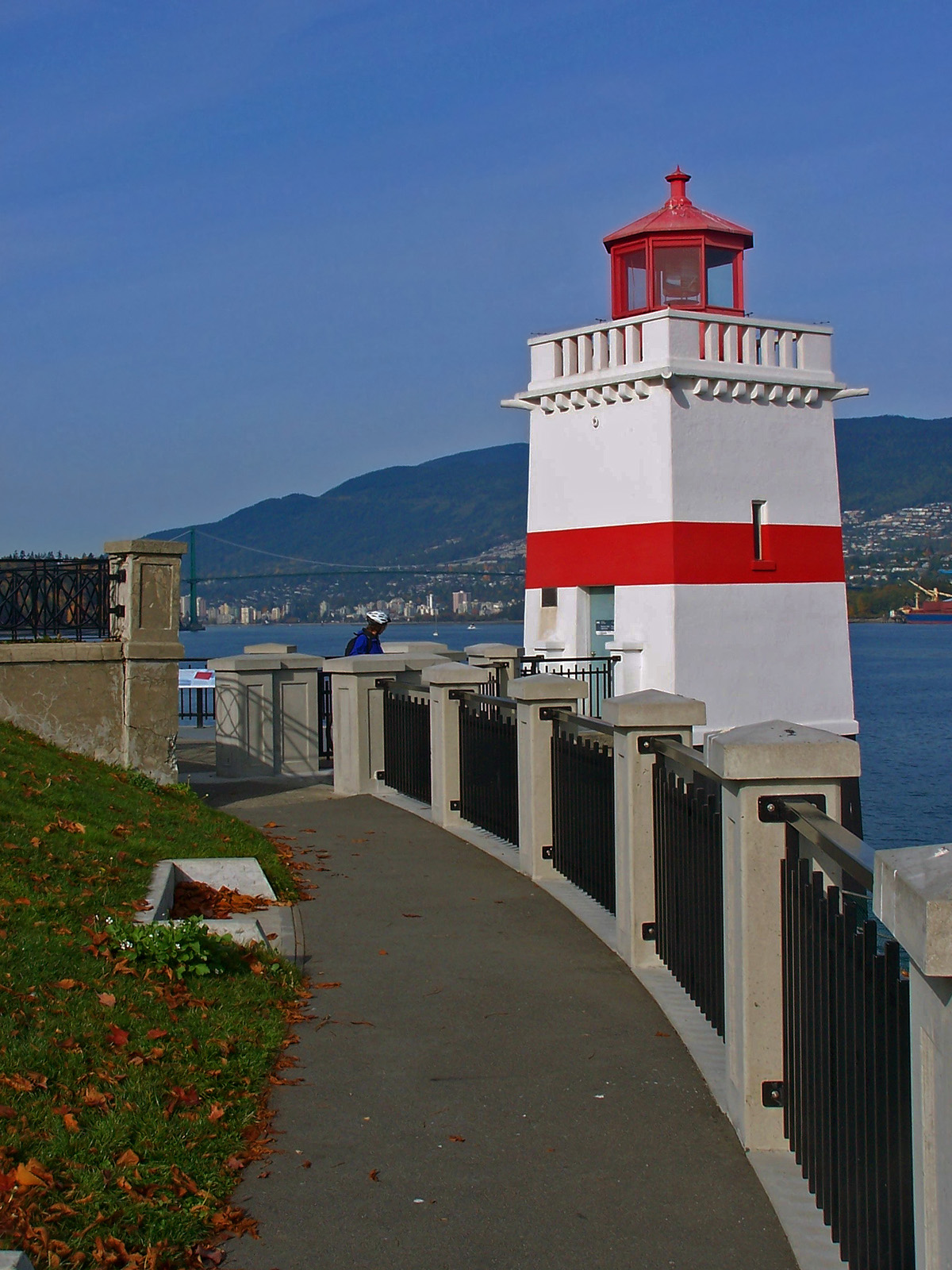

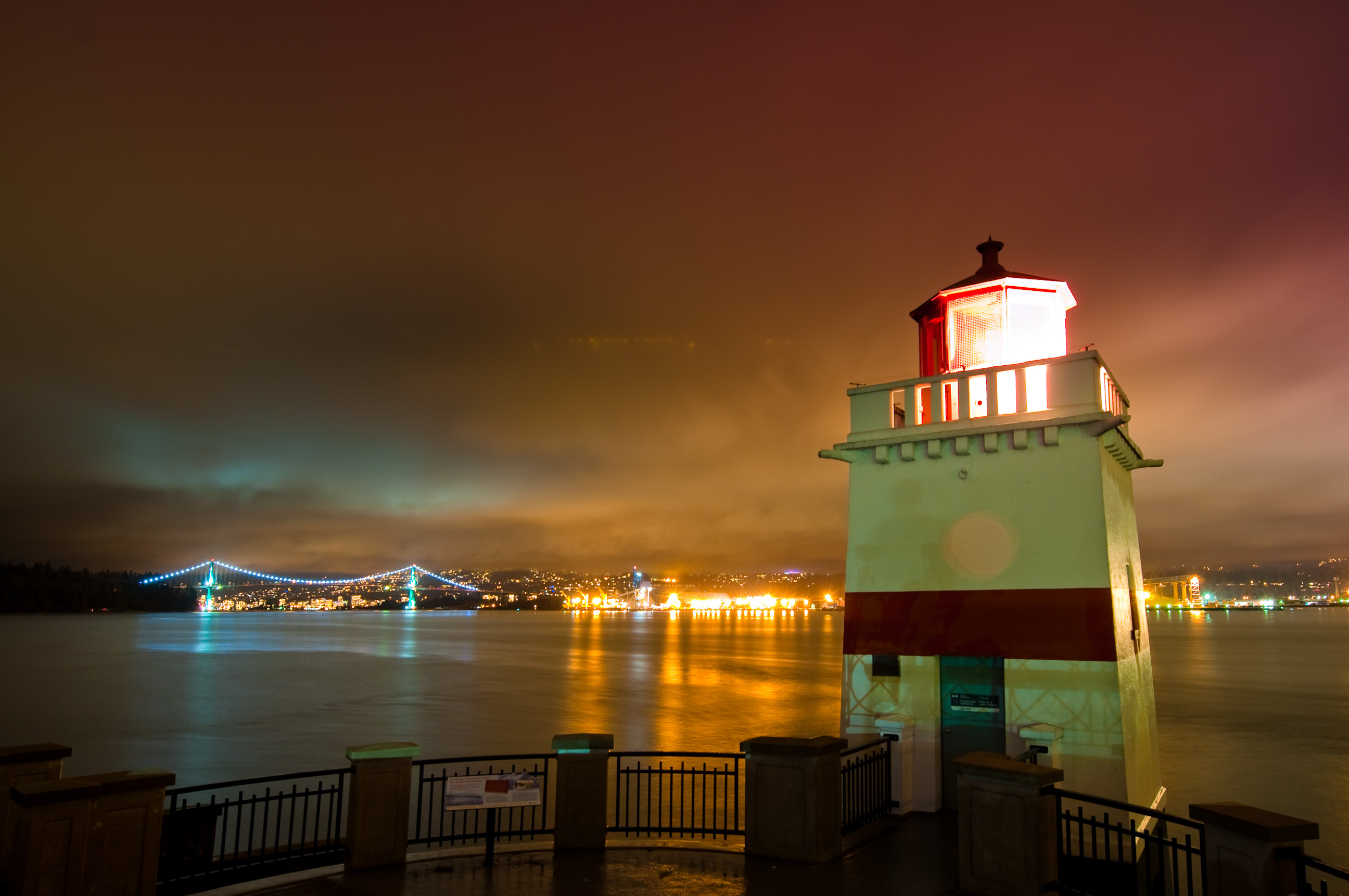

== See also ==
- List of lighthouses in British Columbia
- List of lighthouses in Canada
