= Francis Point Provincial Park =

Provincial park in British Columbia

- IUCN category II (national park)
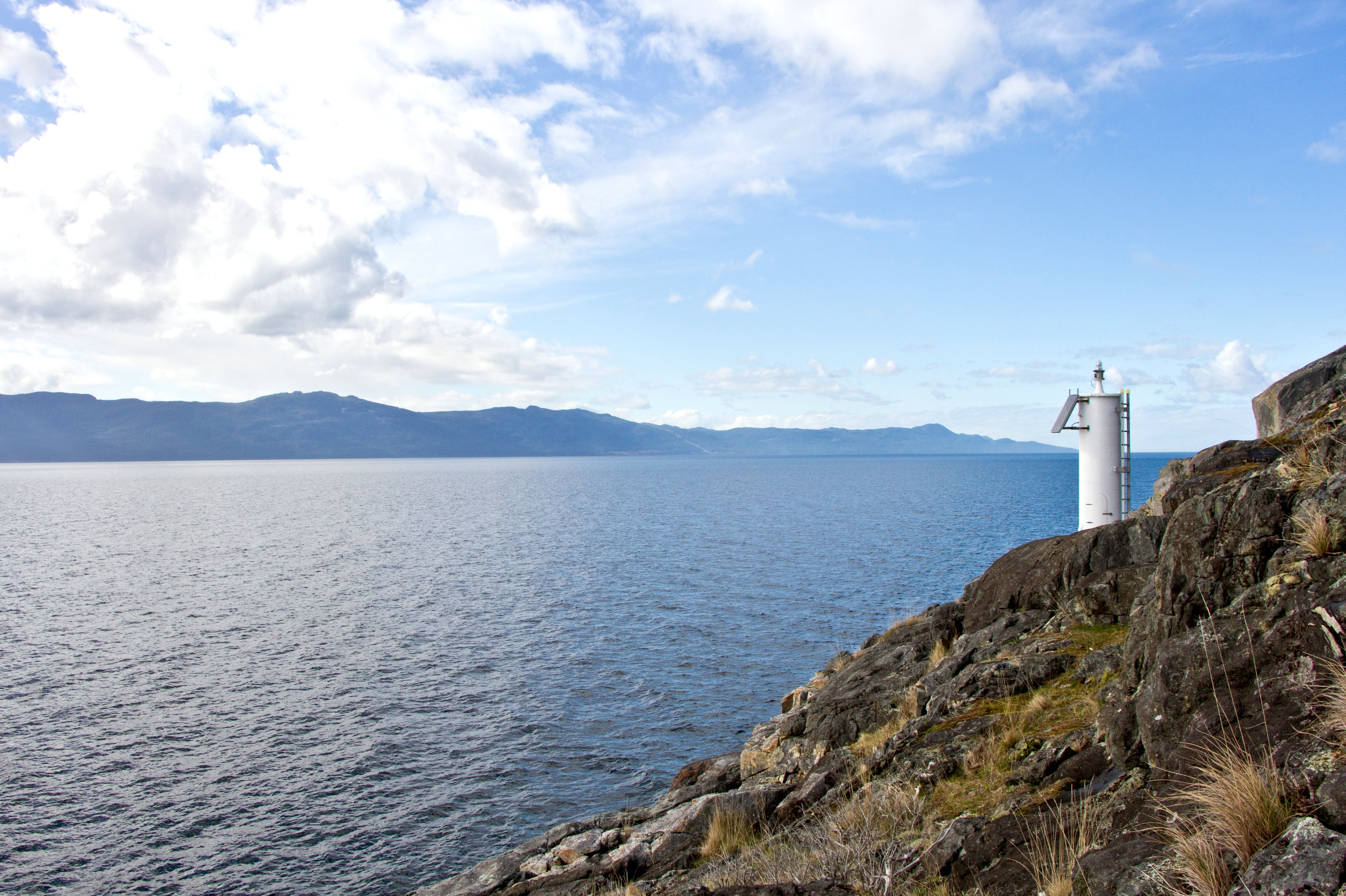
- The lighthouse at Francis Point Provincial Park

- Location within British Columbia
- Interactive map of Francis Point Provincial Park
- Location: New Westminster Land District, British Columbia, Canada
- Nearest city: Pender Harbour, BC
- Coordinates: 49°36′43″N 124°03′28″W
- Area: 83 ha (210 acres)
- Established: May 17, 2004
- Governing body: BC Parks

Francis Point Provincial Park is a provincial park in British Columbia, Canada, located on the southwest end of the Francis Peninsula, south of the community of Pender Harbour on the west side of the Sechelt Peninsula in the Sunshine Coast region. Established in 2004, the park is 83 ha. in size, 74 ha. of it upland, the other 9 ha. foreshore.

== See also ==
- List of British Columbia provincial parks
