= Skir Dhu =

Community in Nova Scotia, Canada

Coordinates: 46°28′45.28″N 60°27′6.32″W

Skir Dhu in Nova Scotia

Skir Dhu (Scottish Gaelic: Sgeir Dubh) is a small community in the Canadian province of Nova Scotia, located in Victoria County on Cape Breton Island. This is a Gaelic name, meaning "Black Rock."
