= Plumper Cove Marine Provincial Park =

Provincial park in British Columbia

- IUCN category II (national park)
- Panoramic view

- Location within British Columbia
- Interactive map of Plumper Cove Marine Provincial Park
- Location: British Columbia, Canada
- Nearest city: Gibsons
- Coordinates: 49°24′19″N 123°27′51″W
- Area: 0.66 km^{2} (0.25 sq mi)
- Established: February 22, 1960
- Governing body: BC Parks

Plumper Cove Marine Provincial Park is a provincial park in British Columbia, Canada. The park is located on the northwest shore of Keats Island in Howe Sound, northwest of Vancouver, British Columbia.

The 66 ha (160 acres) park is one of the oldest marine parks on the BC coast, and a popular anchorage spot in the summer months for boaters. It has a hiking trail system, a grassy upland picnic area, and forested walk-in campsites.

The park is known for its quiet and natural surroundings. Unlike many other provincial campgrounds with vehicle access, local traffic in the park area is limited.

== Trails ==
The trail system consists of the 'Keats Loop', which ascends to a bluff offering a lookout point. Additionally, there is a 2 km (1.2 mi) trail that leads to Keats' Landing. The final segment of this trail can be traveled by either a dirt road or a trail. This 2 km (1.2 mi) trail is considered of intermediate difficulty. The trail features an approximately 1 km (0.62 mi) ascent and a 1 km (0.62 mi) descent in either direction. Near the middle of the trail, it reaches its peak close to the lookout.

== Access ==
Public access to the park is limited to marine routes or hiking. Travelers can take BC Ferries from Horseshoe Bay to Langdale, then board the Stornaway II, which makes infrequent trips to Keats Island and Gambier Island. From Keats Landing, visitors must hike approximately 2 km (1.2 mi) to reach the campground. The trail from Keats Landing to Plumper Cove Marine Park is unsuitable for bicycles, and most trails on the island are similarly challenging. Alternatively, boat visitors can navigate to the park and pay moorage fees at the park dock. Several water taxi services operate from Gibsons to Plumper Cove Marine Park, though these services do not run regularly and may require a charter.

== Recreation ==
From September 24 to May 15, the park does not charge camping fees but has limited services available. Normally, during peak summer months, the camping fee is $16 per night per party for four persons. There are group campsites available which are double sites for larger parties. Group picnicking services are available by private reservation only. Moorage at a buoy costs $12 per night, and moorage at the dock costs $2.00 per meter per night. Docking and moorage fees only apply after 6 pm. During the winter months, most services are free of charge. Garbage service is limited and visitors should plan to pack out anything they may bring.

The park has potable water available from a hand pump only from May 15 to September 15 and the pit toilets are open year-round.

Due to storm damage in the winter of 2006, the dock at the Park was destroyed and replaced in 2007.
