= Musquodoboit =

Musquodoboit may refer to the following places in Nova Scotia, Canada:

== Communities ==
- Centre Musquodoboit, Nova Scotia
- Middle Musquodoboit, Nova Scotia
- Musquodoboit Harbour, Nova Scotia
- Upper Musquodoboit, Nova Scotia
- Musquodoboit Valley & Dutch Settlement, Nova Scotia

== Geographical features ==
- Musquodoboit Harbour
- Musquodoboit River
- Musquodoboit Valley

== Other ==
- Musquodoboit Rural High School
- Musquodoboit Trailway
