= Little Harbour, Richmond, Nova Scotia =

Community in Nova Scotia, Canada

Coordinates: 45°35′5.03″N 60°43′51.16″W

Little Harbour in Nova Scotia

Little Harbour is a community in the Canadian province of Nova Scotia, in Richmond County on Cape Breton Island.
