= Charles Bruce Fergusson =

Canadian historian (1911–1978)

Charles Bruce Fergusson CM
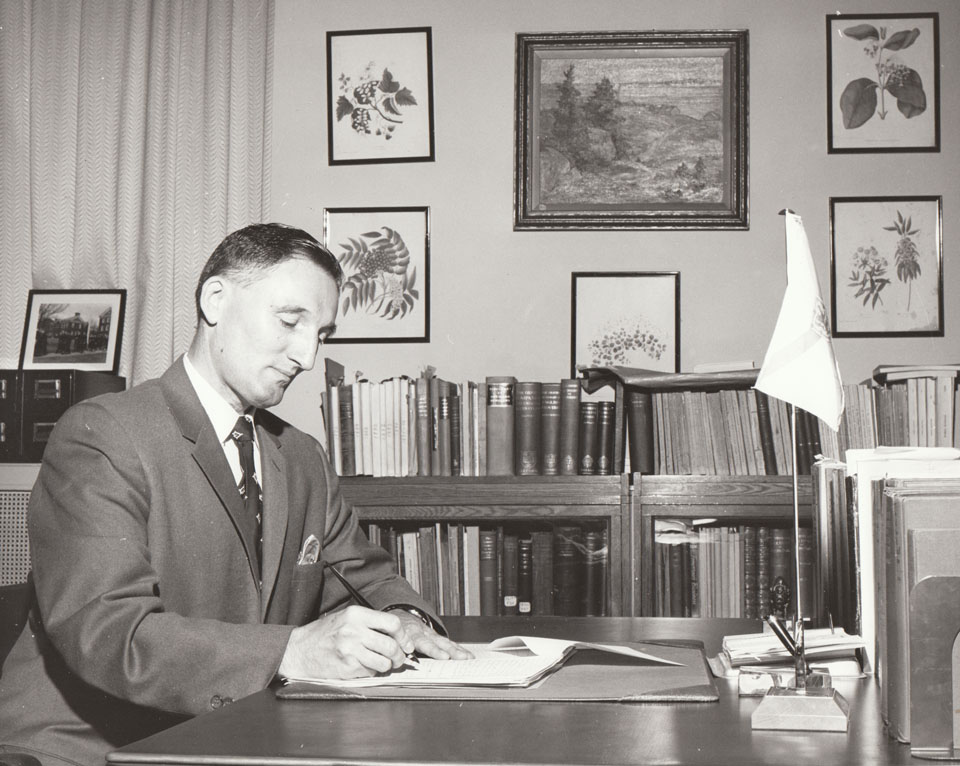
- Fergusson in his office (1961)
- Born: 14 February 1911; Port Morien, Nova Scotia, Canada
- Died: 20 September 1978 (aged 67); Halifax, Nova Scotia, Canada
- Occupations: Historian; archivist
- Notable work: Place-Names and Places of Nova Scotia (1967)
- Awards: Member of the Order of Canada

Provincial Archivist of Nova Scotia
- In office 1956–1977
- Preceded by: Daniel Cobb Harvey
- Succeeded by: Hugh Taylor

Charles Bruce Fergusson CM (14 February 1911 – 20 September 1978) was a Canadian historian who served as the Provincial Archivist of Nova Scotia from 1956 to 1977. Under Fergusson's leadership, the Public Archives of Nova Scotia began a microfilm program, doubled its holdings of books and pamphlets, and saw a fivefold increase in visitors. He taught contemporary history at the Nova Scotia Technical College from 1946 to 1950, and became an associate professor of history at Dalhousie University in 1957. Fergusson authored and edited almost 100 books, articles, and pamphlets over the course of his career, the most well-known of which being Place-Names and Places of Nova Scotia (1967) and Members of the Legislative Assembly of Nova Scotia, 1758–1958 (1958).

== Early life and education ==
Fergusson was born on 14 February 1911 in Port Morien, Nova Scotia, to parents Norman and Eva Jane Fergusson (née Spencer). He attended secondary school at the Nova Scotia Normal College, receiving a Governor General's Medal for his academic performance. He went on to earn a Bachelor of Arts from Dalhousie University in Halifax, where he was president of the Effective Speaking Club and Student's Christian Movement and received the Rhodes Scholarship in 1934. Through the scholarship, he attended Oxford University where he earned a Bachelor of Arts, a Master of Arts, and a Doctor of Philosophy (PhD) in history.

== Career ==
=== Military service ===
During the Second World War, Fergusson was affiliated with the Works Branch of the Royal Canadian Air Force Eastern Air Command, worked as a civil service examiner in Ottawa, and subsequently enlisted in the Royal Canadian Navy. He returned to Canada and continued working in Ottawa as a civil service examiner after the war.

=== Archival and academic career ===
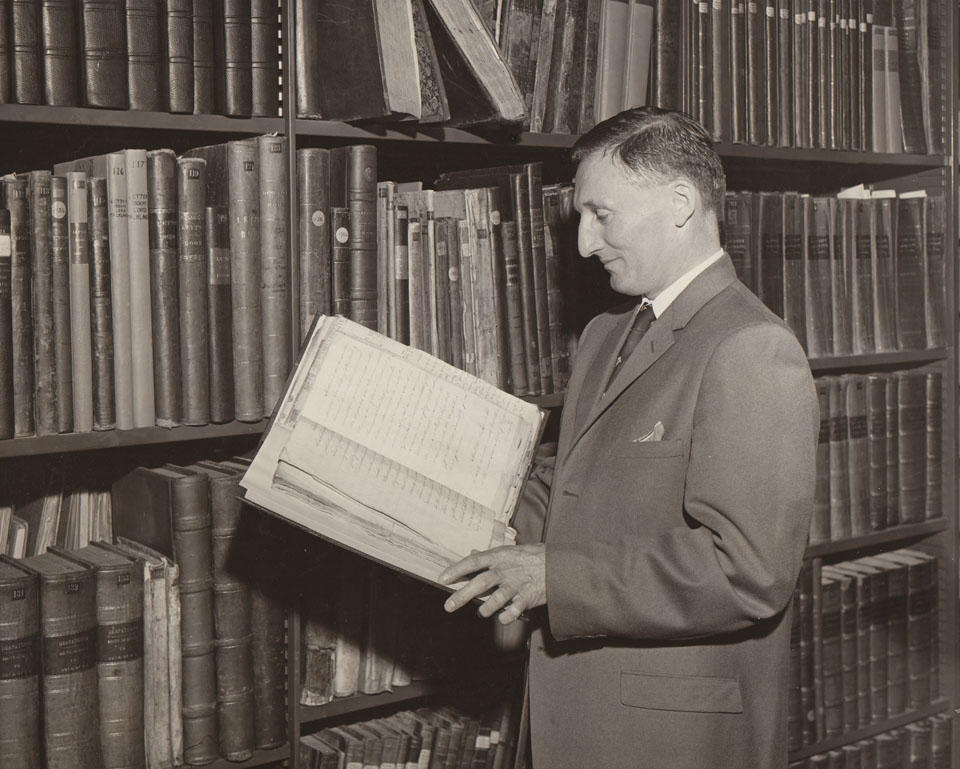
Under Fergusson's leadership, the Public Archives of Nova Scotia doubled its holdings of books and pamphlets

Fergusson was appointed as the Assistant Provincial Archivist of Nova Scotia in 1946, and served as the Provincial Archivist of Nova Scotia from 1956 until his retirement in 1977. One of the first projects undertaken by Fergusson as Provincial Archivist was the development of a microfilming program which ultimately produced over 10,000 reels of microfilm. Fergusson implemented a policy of keeping the Public Archives of Nova Scotia open seven days a week until 10pm, with full service for researchers. Under his leadership, the archives doubled its holdings of books and pamphlets through large acquisitions of materials from municipal, county, court and school records. The archives saw a fivefold increase in visitors across Fergusson's tenure, with 13,000 researchers accessing the archives in 1977.

He taught contemporary history at the Nova Scotia Technical College from 1946 to 1950, and became an associate professor of history at Dalhousie University in 1957. He served as Chairman of the Historic Sites and Monuments Board of Canada from 1963 to 1965, and in 1975 was elected as the National President of the Canadian Authors Association. In 1976, Fergusson stated that Canadian publishers were under pressure by the book-dumping practices of American publishers, where companies were selling their leftover inventory in Canada at prices which he said could undercut Canadian book production. Fergusson called for the federal government to take steps to benefit Canadian authors as opposed to penalizing American publishers.

Fergusson authored and edited almost 100 books, articles and pamphlets across his career, mostly concerning the history of Nova Scotia. Many of his publications were released through the Public Archives of Nova Scotia, the most well-known of which being Place-Names and Places of Nova Scotia (1967) and Members of the Legislative Assembly of Nova Scotia, 1758-1958 (1958). Fergusson edited various historic texts, including the diary of Simeon Perkins.

=== Death and legacy ===
Fergusson was awarded the Order of Canada on 4 July 1978 and was invested posthumously on 25 April 1979, following his death in Halifax on 20 September 1978. In his honour, Dalhousie University established the C. Bruce Fergusson Prize, awarded to the top Honours student in the history department who enrolls in a Masters program in the study of Nova Scotian history.

== Place-Names and Places of Nova Scotia ==
The Public Archives of Nova Scotia published Place-Names and Places of Nova Scotia in 1967, with an introduction by Fergusson. The book was developed as a special project to celebrate the Canadian Centennial. It contains over 2,300 locations, each with a description of varying length from four or five sentences to several pages. The descriptions discuss the origin of each name as well as a brief account of the location's history. Prior to the publication of the book, the only study exclusively dedicated to the toponymy of Nova Scotia was Thomas J. Brown's Place-Names of the Province of Nova Scotia (1922).

== Selected works ==
- Fergusson, C. Bruce (1958). A Directory of the Members of the Legislative Assembly of Nova Scotia, 1758–1958. Halifax, NS: Public Archives of Nova Scotia. LCCN 59004085. OCLC 5147765.
- — (1967). Place-Names and Places of Nova Scotia. Halifax, NS: Public Archives of Nova Scotia. LCCN 73442254. OCLC 56582. (Note: Republished by Mika Publishing Company in 1974 (OCLC 1501022), 1976 (OCLC 639787645), and 1982 (OCLC 12849117).)
- — (1967). The Diary of Simeon Perkins: 1797–1803. Toronto, ON: Champlain Society. OCLC 57131118.
- — (1967). Minutes of His Majesty's Council at Annapolis Royal, 1736–1749. Halifax, NS: Public Archives of Nova Scotia. LCCN 79519613. OCLC 612874577.
- — (1969). The Diary of Simeon Perkins: 1780–1789. Toronto, ON: Champlain Society. OCLC 757241421.
- — (1971). Rt. Hon. W. S. Fielding. Hantsport, NS: Lancelot Press. LCCN 72193271. OCLC 1264744300.
- — (1973). Joseph Howe of Nova Scotia. Hantsport, NS: Lancelot Press. LCCN 75305141. OCLC 997840.
- —; Pope, William (1974). Glimpses Into Nova Scotia History. Hantsport, NS: Lancelot Press. ISBN 978-0-8899-9031-9. OCLC 1366670.
- — (1978). The Diary of Simeon Perkins: 1804–1812. Toronto, ON: Champlain Society. OCLC 24314424.
