= Daniel Cobb Harvey =

Canadian historian (1886–1966)

Daniel Cobb Harvey FRSC
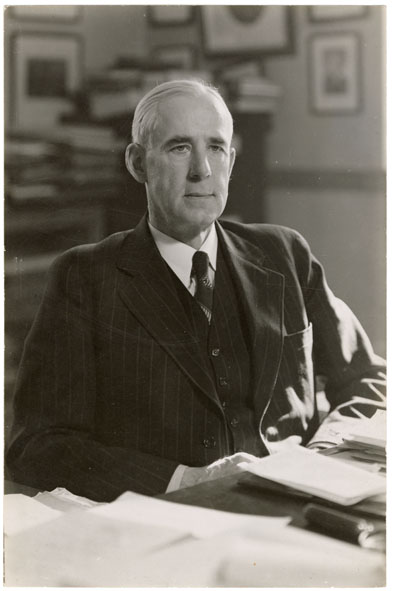
- Born: 10 January 1886; Cape Traverse, Prince Edward Island, Canada
- Died: 7 August 1966 (aged 80); Halifax, Nova Scotia, Canada
- Occupations: Historian; archivist
- Awards: J. B. Tyrrell Historical Medal

Provincial Archivist of Nova Scotia
- In office 1931–1956
- Succeeded by: Charles Bruce Fergusson

Daniel Cobb Harvey FRSC (10 January 1886 – 7 August 1966) was a Canadian historian and archivist who was the Provincial Archivist of Nova Scotia from 1931 to 1956.

== Biography ==
Harvey was born on 10 January 1886 in Cape Traverse, Prince Edward Island, to parents John and Margaret Harvey (née Cobb). He attended Prince of Wales College and then Dalhousie University where he graduated in 1910. He achieved a Rhodes scholar upon graduation and then attended Oxford University where he obtained a B.A. and an M.A. From 1915 to 1931, he taught at Wesley College and then at the University of Manitoba. In 1931, he became Provincial Archivist of Nova Scotia, a newly created position and stayed in the capacity until his retirement in 1956.

He was President of the Canadian Historical Association from 1937 to 1938. He was elected a fellow of the Royal Society of Canada in 1928 and he received its J. B. Tyrrell Historical Medal in 1942.

Harvey died in Halifax, Nova Scotia, on 7 August 1966, at the age of 80.

== Publications ==
- Thomas Darcy McGee: The Prophet Of Canadian Nationality, (1923)
- The French Régime in Prince Edward Island, (1926)
- The Centenary Of Edward Whelan, (1926)
- Joseph Howe And Local Patriotism, (1927)
- Sir George Etienne Cartier, (1930)
- The Colonization Of Canada, (1936)
- The Heart of Howe, (1939)
