= Little Harbour, Nova Scotia =

Little Harbour, Nova Scotia could mean the following places:

- Little Harbour, Halifax, Nova Scotia in the Halifax Regional Municipality
- Little Harbour, Shelburne, Nova Scotia in the Municipality of the District of Shelburne
- Little Harbour, Pictou, Nova Scotia in Pictou County
- Little Harbour, Richmond, Nova Scotia in Richmond County
