= Brooklyn, Nova Scotia =

Brooklyn, Nova Scotia may refer to:

- Brooklyn, Hants County, Nova Scotia (for postal purposes it may also be referred to as Newport, Nova Scotia)
- Brooklyn, Queens County, Nova Scotia
- Brooklyn, Yarmouth County, Nova Scotia
