= Nova Scotia Archives =

Archives of Nova Scotia, Canada

Coordinates: 44.637568°N 63.585965°W

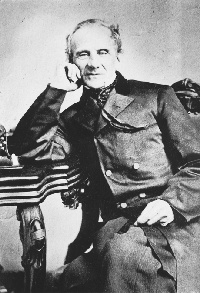
Thomas Beamish Akins (1809-1891), first Provincial Archivist of Nova Scotia.

Nova Scotia Archives is a governmental archival institution serving the Canadian province of Nova Scotia. The archives acquires, preserves and makes available the province's documentary heritage – recorded information of provincial significance created or accumulated by government and the private sector over the last 300 years.

== History ==
The idea for a provincial archives and a Provincial Archivist first took root on April 30, 1857 when a resolution was put forward in the Legislative Assembly (moved by Joseph Howe, and seconded by James W. Johnston), making it the first provincial archives in Canada. Thomas Beamish Akins, a lawyer, historian, archivist, and author, was appointed Nova Scotia's first Commissioner of Public Records from 1857 until his death in 1891.

In 1931, the Nova Scotia Archives became the first provincial archives in Canada to have a purpose-built building. The Chase Building, designed by Andrew R. Cobb, still exists and is now home to the Math department of Dalhousie University. The current Public Archives Building, designed by Keith L. Graham, opened in 1980 to provide additional vault space and allow for the storage of all archival records under one roof.

The department itself was formerly known as the Public Archives of Nova Scotia and was renamed Nova Scotia Archives & Records Management in 1997 after it assumed responsibility of government record-keeping. The former name is still used in certain applications, such as at the agency's headquarters at Robie Street and University Avenue in Halifax. It is a Division of the Department of Communities, Culture and Heritage. In 2011, the archives' official name changed to the Nova Scotia Archives.

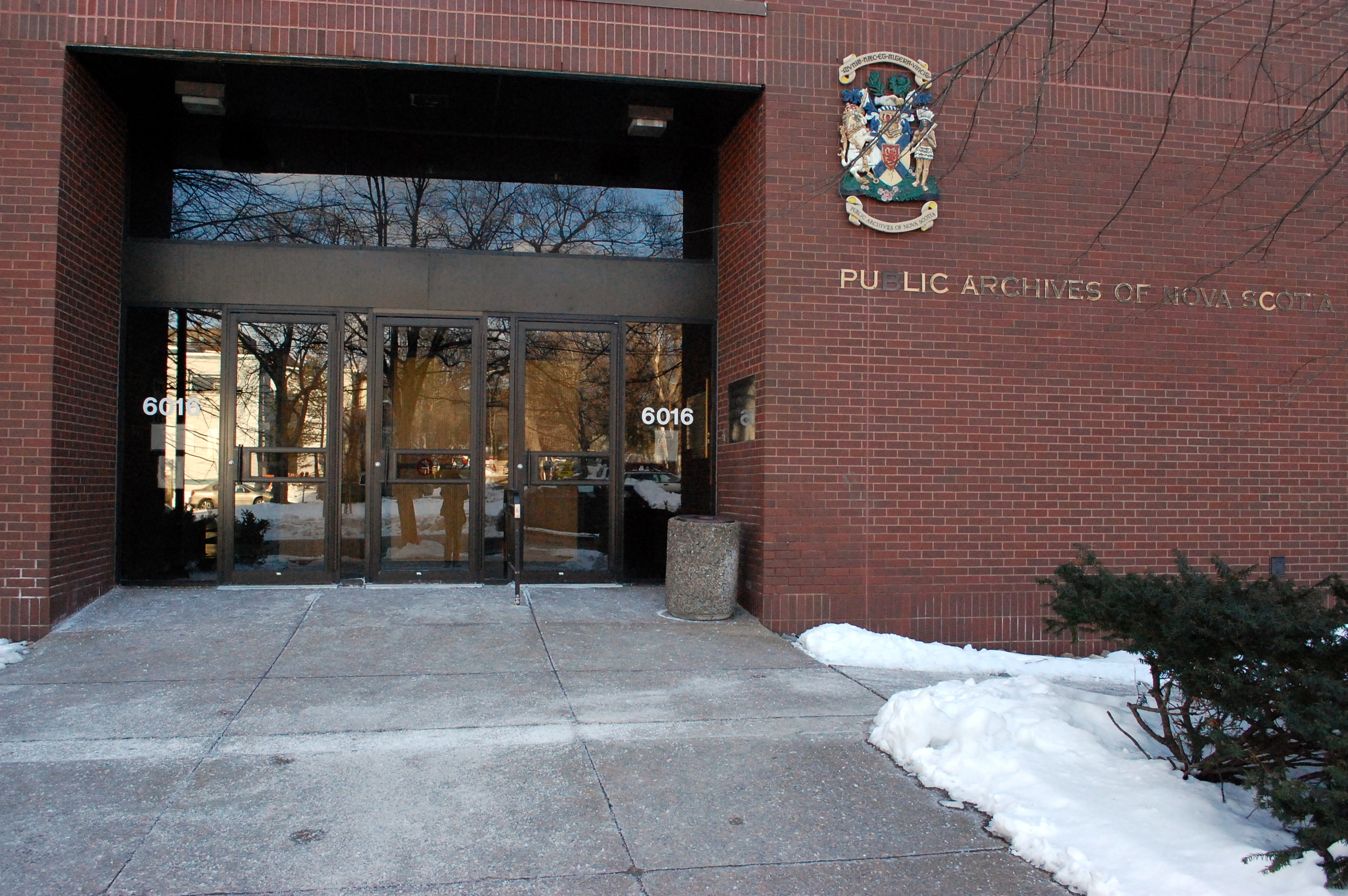
Entrance to the new archives building on Robie Street

The Nova Scotia Archives continues to digitize large parts of its collections for viewing on their website. Their website contains approximately 70 virtual exhibits and databases, and features thousands of archival photos and documents. Nova Scotia Historical Vital Statistics, the Nova Scotia Archives' genealogy website, contains birth, death, and marriage records from 1763 to 1958 with new accruals being added every year.

The Nova Scotia Archives is the home of the Royal Nova Scotia Historical Society.

== Provincial Archivist of Nova Scotia ==
The Provincial Archivist of Nova Scotia is the senior official responsible for the management of the Nova Scotia Archives. The following people have served in this position:

- Daniel Cobb Harvey (1931–1956)
- Charles Bruce Fergusson (1956–1977)
- Hugh Taylor (1978–1982)
- Phyllis Blakeley (1982–1985)
- Carman V. Carroll (1985–1997)
- Patti Bannister (present)
