= George Richards (Royal Navy officer) =

Royal Navy Admiral (1820–1896)

Admiral Sir George Richards KCB FRS
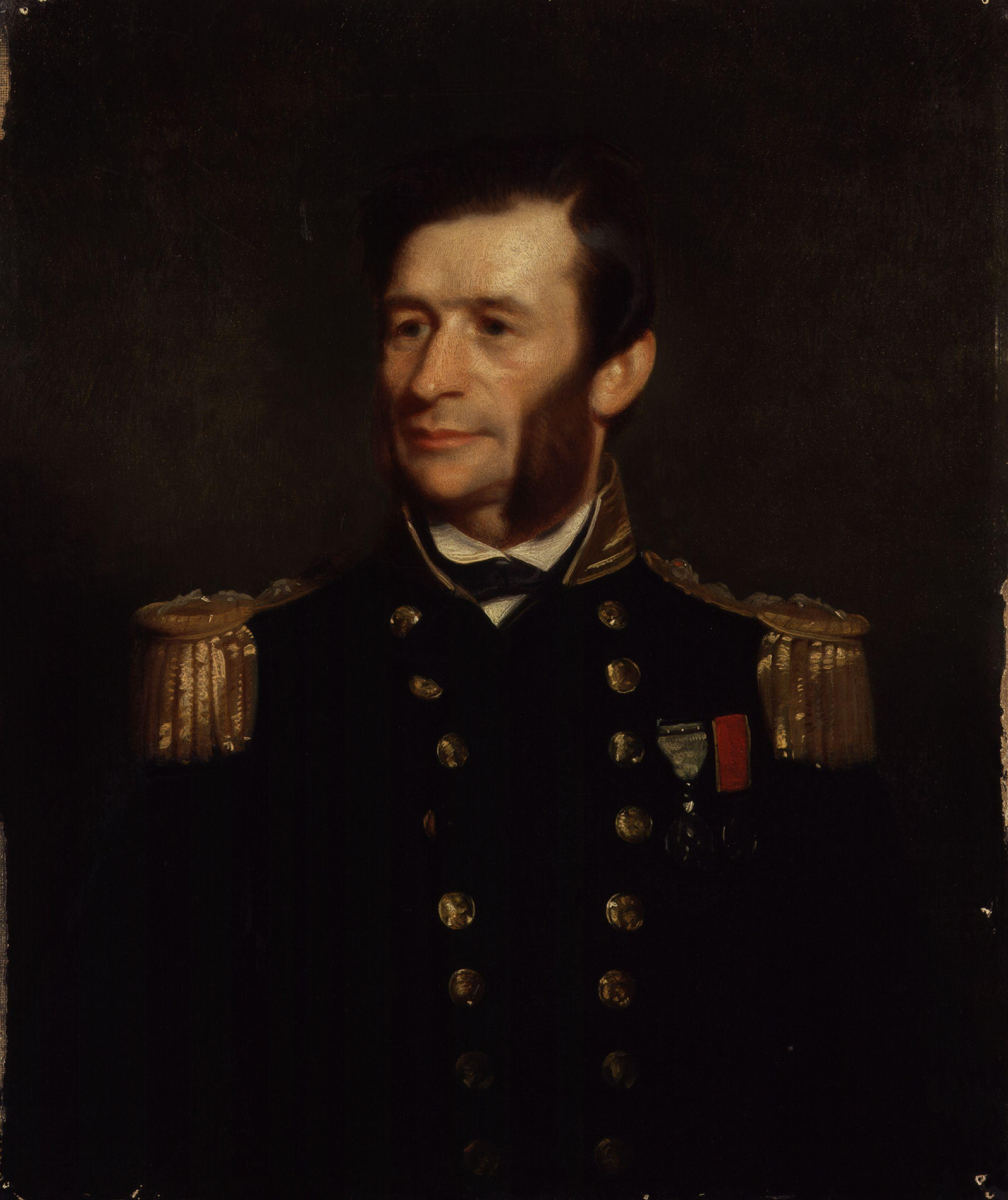
- 1865 portrait of Richards
- Born: 13 January 1820; Antony, Cornwall, England
- Died: 14 November 1896 (aged 76); Bath, Somerset, England
- Military career
- Allegiance: United Kingdom
- Branch: Royal Navy
- Service years: 1832–1896
- Rank: Admiral
- Commands: HMS Plumper (1848); HMS Hecate (1839)
- Wars: First Opium War

Sir George Henry Richards KCB FRS (13 January 1820 – 14 November 1896) was Hydrographer of the Royal Navy from 1863 to 1874.

== Biography ==
Richards was born in Antony, Cornwall, the son of Captain G. S. Richards, and joined the Royal Navy in 1832. His eldest son, George Edward Richards also became a Royal Navy officer and hydrographic surveyor.

=== Naval career ===
He served in South America, the Falkland Islands, New Zealand, Australia and in the First Opium War in China. Promoted to captain in 1854, from 1857 to 1864 he was in command of the two survey ships: HMS Plumper and HMS Hecate.

==== Survey work in Canada ====
Admiralty Chart of Vancouver Island, surveyed by Richards in 1859–1865.

He was the second British commissioner to the San Juan Islands Boundary Commission and a hydrographer on the coast of British Columbia in 1857–1862. He is responsible for the selection and designation of dozens of placenames along the British Columbia coast. In the Vancouver area, for example, he named False Creek. In 1859, after his engineer Francis Brockton found a vein of coal, he named Brockton Point and the area of Coal Harbour. In 1860, he named Mount Garibaldi after Giuseppe Garibaldi. Other landmarks in the area named by him are the Britannia Range, and Brunswick Mountain and many features in the Howe Sound, Sunshine Coast, and Jervis Inlet areas.

In 1863 he was appointed Hydrographer to the Navy and held that position until 1874 when he retired. At a time when the merchant navy was expanding rapidly and telegraphic underwater cable laying operations were intensifying, the Admiralty had a great need for more accurate ocean charts. It was in this context that Richards was asked to organise the scientific cruises of the H.M.S. Porcupine and the H.M.S. Lightning between 1868 and 1870, followed by that of the H.M.S. Challenger.

== Later life ==
He was elected a Fellow of the Royal Society in June 1866 and a corresponding member of the French Academy of Sciences in the same year. He was knighted in 1877, became a Knight Commander of the Order of the Bath in 1881 and became an admiral in 1884. He died in Bath, Somerset aged 76.

A portrait of him by Stephen Pearce, dated 1865, hangs in the National Portrait Gallery in London. Mount Richards in Waterton Lakes National Park in Alberta, Canada is named in his honor.
