= Brockton Point =

Headland in Vancouver, Canada

Coordinates: 49.3009°N 123.1169°W

- Headland
- Interactive map of Brockton Point
- Coordinates
- Location: Vancouver, British Columbia, Canada
- Part of: Stanley Park
- Water bodies: Coal Harbour

Brockton Point is a headland off the Downtown Peninsula of Vancouver, on the north side of Coal Harbour. Named after Francis Brockton, it is the most easterly part of Stanley Park and is home to a 100-year-old lighthouse and several hand-carved totem poles made in British Columbia. Like the rest of Stanley Park coastline, Brockton Point is lined by the Vancouver Seawall.

Part of the land at the point was first cleared in 1865 in order to construct a sawmill. Due to rough currents around the point and a reef offshore, the Burnaby Shoal, however, the mill was built in Gastown and the point instead became the primary sports fields of early Vancouver. The main sporting venue, Brockton Oval, has been visited by cricket players such as Donald Bradman, Fred Trueman and Geoffrey Boycott. Cricket and rugby football are still played here.

== History ==
Before 1865, the point was utilized as a graveyard for early settlers who came to Vancouver. That year, Edward Stamp—a British businessman in the timber industry—cleared away part of the site in order to build a sawmill. However, he was forced to abandon his plans after realizing the strong currents from the harbour impeded the construction of log booms. He ended up moving the mill to Gastown, becoming Hastings Mill.

The land cleared by Stamp was converted into sports fields by 1891. One of these, Brockton Oval, became a key amateur sports venue and was mostly used for cricket. Donald Bradman and Fred Trueman both played at the Oval, and after Bradman's visit in 1932, he called the venue the most beautiful cricket ground in the world. Geoffrey Boycott also played at the grounds in September 1964 and echoed Bradman's sentiments and praise of the Oval.

=== Totem poles ===
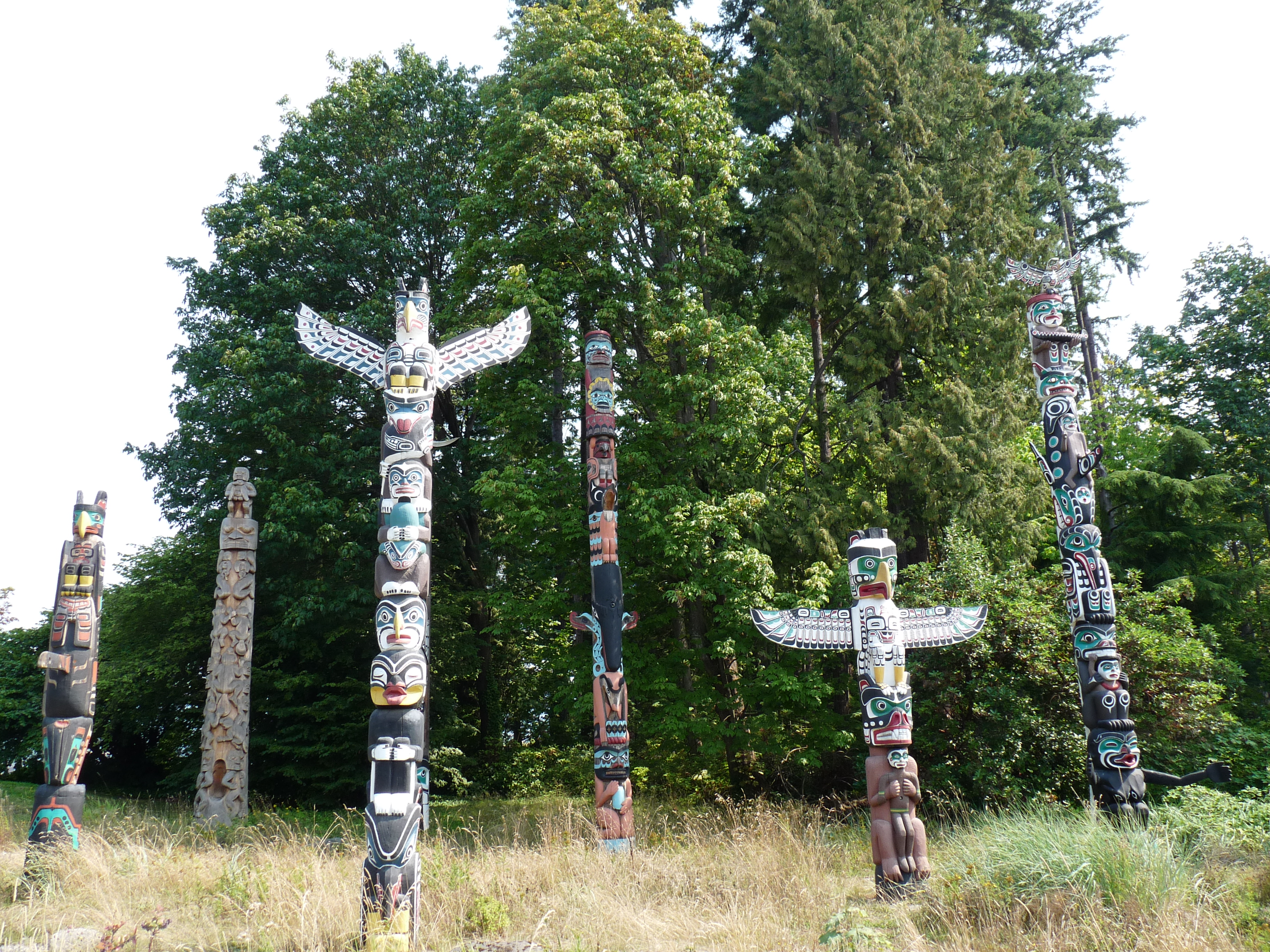
Totem poles at Brockton Point

One of the province's most popular attractions is a group of ten totem poles at Brockton Point. Four totem poles were originally brought from Alert Bay and placed at Lumbermen's Arch in 1924. Some had been carved back in the late 1880s. More totem poles were purchased in the 1920s and 1930s, this time originating from the Haida Gwaii and Rivers Inlet. All of the totem poles were moved to Brockton Point in 1962 to allow the construction of an overhead road at Lumberman's Arch. Many of them have been replaced with replicas, with the originals now kept in museums for preservation. The most recent addition, erected in 2009, was carved by a member of the Squamish Nation whose mother was born in Stanley Park. There is a visitor center and gift shop near the totems called Legends of the Moon at the Totem Pole Interpretive Centre.

In 2024, the Kakasoʼlas pole by Ellen Neel was removed from the park, where it had been on loan since the 1980s.

== Lighthouse ==
A number of ship collisions in the waters around the point led to the construction of a lighthouse and signaling station at Brockton Point. For a time, Brockton Point had a lighthouse keeper, who served for 25 years starting in 1855 and is credited for having saved 16 people from drowning. The present day lighthouse tower with an automatic light was built in 1914. It was designed by British Landscape Architect Thomas Hayton Mawson, who also constructed the lifeboat house located below the point and other Stanley Park landmarks.

== See also ==
- List of lighthouses in British Columbia
