= HMS Hecate (1839) =

Sloop of the Royal Navy

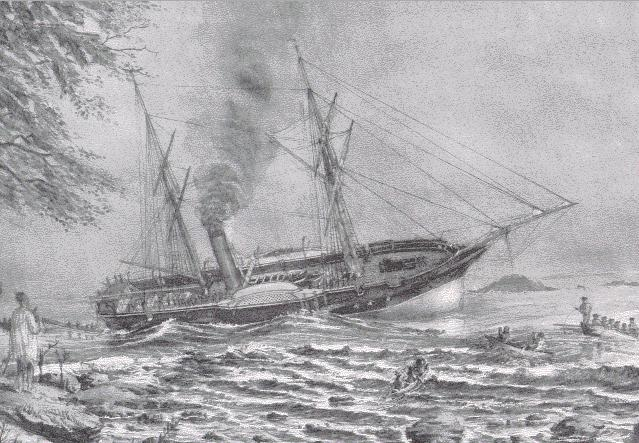
- Hecate aground in Neah Bay east of Cape Flattery between 15 and 21 August 1861

History

United Kingdom
- Name: HMS Hecate
- Ordered: 12 March 1838
- Builder: Chatham Dockyard
- Cost: £27,742
- Laid down: June 1838
- Launched: 30 March 1839
- Commissioned: 7 December 1839
- Fate: Sold for breaking in 1865

General characteristics
- Type: Screw sloop
- Tons burthen: 817 bm
- Length: 165 ft (50.3 m)
- Beam: 32 ft 10 in (10.0 m)
- Draught: 13 ft (4.0 m) (aft)
- Depth of hold: 20 ft (6.1 m)
- Installed power: 240 nhp
- Propulsion: Iron tubular boilers; 2-cylinder side lever steam engine; Paddles
- Sail plan: Brig rig
- Speed: 9 knots (17 km/h) (under steam)
- Complement: 135
- Armament: 2 × 8-inch (65cwt) guns on pivots fore and aft; 2 × 32-pounder (50cwt) guns

HMS Hecate was a 4-gun Hydra-class paddle sloop launched on 30 March 1839 from the Chatham Dockyard.

== Service ==
She was assigned to the Mediterranean Station between 1840 and 1843, she participated during the Syrian War of 1840. After a period of being laid in reserve she served as part of the West Africa Squadron off Africa from 1845 until 1858. On 1 January 1856, Hecate sank the American brigantine Chatsworth, which was engaged in the slave trade. Her crew survived. Later that month, she ran aground at Lagos. The steamship Puffin was subsequently wrecked during operations to salvage her guns. After being fitted out for survey operations, she was assigned to the Pacific Station in 1860, undertaking surveys along the British Columbia coast. The Hecate Strait, between the British Columbia mainland and the islands of Haida Gwaii, is named for her. Arriving at the Australia Station in 1863, she undertook survey work in Botany Bay, Moreton Bay, the Brisbane River and Torres Strait before leaving the Australia Station in 1864.

== Fate ==
She was paid off and sold to Castle of Charlton for breaking in 1865.
