= Masumi Mitsui =

Canadian World War I veteran

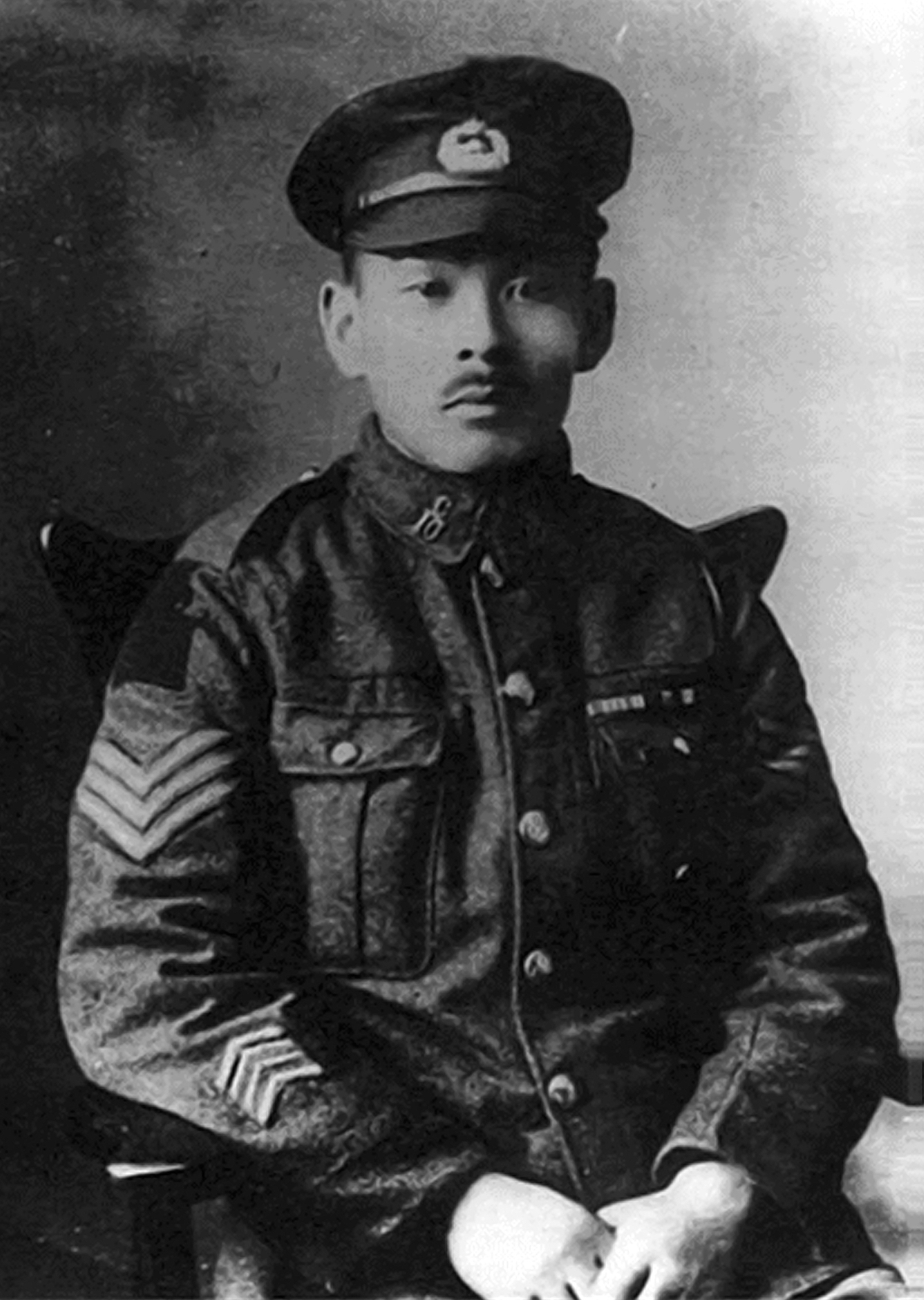
- Masami Mitsui c. World War I
- Born: October 7, 1887; Kokura, Japan
- Died: April 22, 1987 (aged 99); Canada
- Known for: Commander of the Japanese Canadians of the 10th Battalion, CEF during World War I
- Awards: British War Medal; Military Medal; Victory Medal

Masumi Mitsui, MM (7 October 1887 – 22 April 1987), was a Japanese-born Canadian veteran of World War I who had his property confiscated and was detained during World War II as part of the Japanese-Canadian internment.

In World War I Mitsui fought at the Battle of Vimy Ridge and led 35 Japanese Canadians in the Battle of Hill 70. He attained the rank of sergeant and was awarded the British War Medal, Military Medal, and Victory Medal. Following the war, he served as president of British Columbia Branch No. 9 of the Royal Canadian Legion and pressed for the rights of Japanese Canadians. During World War II he and his family had their property confiscated and suffered Japanese Canadian internment, despite Mitsui's status as a decorated veteran of the First World War. He was a guest in 1985 at the ceremony in Vancouver's Stanley Park for the relighting of the lamp on the Japanese Canadian War Memorial; the lamp had been extinguished in 1942. He was the oldest surviving Japanese-Canadian veteran of World War I when he died.

== Biography ==
Masumi Mitsui was born on 7 October 1887 in Kokura, Fukuoka Prefecture, in Japan. His grandfather had been a samurai. Mitsui emigrated to Canada in 1908, where he worked at first as a waiter at the Union Club in Victoria, British Columbia. He developed a strong command of English and drew notice for his leadership skills.

=== World War I ===
World War I broke out in 1914. The federal government was reluctant to accept recruits from ethnic minorities; the Cabinet of Canada rejected a battalion of 171 volunteers the Canadian Japanese Association had trained in early 1916, in which Mitsui had taken part.

Strong feelings against Asian immigrants in British Columbia led to widespread discrimination, and even Anti-Oriental Riots of 1907. The province accepted few Japanese volunteers, but neighbouring Alberta posed fewer barriers; the majority of Japanese-Canadian recruits travelled from British Columbia to enlist in Alberta. Mitsui travelled in 1916 to Calgary to enlist with the 192nd Overseas Battalion. He later stated he enlisted because he "believed that it would be for the benefit of Canada and for the benefit of Japan".

Mitsui embarked for Britain on the RMS Empress of Britain that October and was posted to the 9th Reserve Battalion on 25 January 1917. He and six other Japanese-Canadian recruits arrived at the front in France on 5 March 1917 as part of the 10th Battalion, CEF. They suffered racial discrimination at first, but Mitsui stated that in battle "there was no time for such behaviour". He fought at the Battle of Vimy Ridge and later was wounded in battle that 28 April.

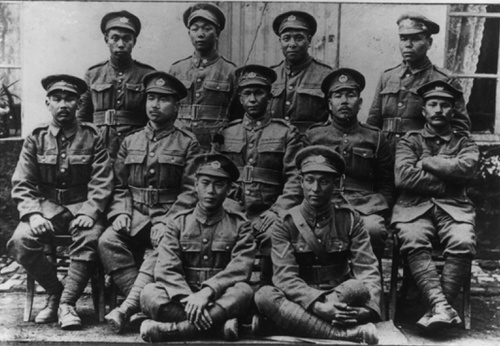
The Japanese-Canadian platoon of the 10th Battalion, CEF, Mitsui at the far left

To deal with the poor English of many of the Japanese recruits, they were placed under the command of the bilingual Mitsui. He led 35 Japanese Canadians in the Battle of Hill 70, only five of whom survived. During the battle Mitsui retrieved a Lewis machinegun and brought it back to use against the enemy. He received the British Military Medal for leadership, bravery in battle, and assistance to the wounded on the battlefield there. He also received the British War Medal and Victory Medal.

After the war ended, Mitsui led his unit in December 1918 across the Rhine into Cologne. Mitsui's command had suffered heavy deaths and casualties and he wrote of feeling "very depressed" after the death by machinegun fire of his friend Kumakichi Oura. Mitsui refused to discuss his experiences of the war after it ended. He was honourably discharged on 23 April 1919 with the rank of sergeant.

=== Between the wars ===
The Canadian Legion, a veteran's organization, was founded in 1925, and the following year Japanese-Canadian veterans established British Columbia Branch No. 9. The branch petitioned for Japanese-Canadian rights, such as the right to vote, for which it gained the unanimous backing of the Canadian Legion in 1930. The branch made Mitsui its president in 1931. Mitsui and other members travelled to Victoria to promote the Provincial Elections Act, which would extend suffrage to Japanese-Canadian war veterans in British Columbia. Their campaigning led to the passage of the bill by a single vote in the Legislative Assembly of British Columbia.

=== World War II and internment ===
Japan's attack on Pearl Harbor on 7 December 1941 brought the United States into World War II, and the attack on Hong Kong the next day brought Britain and the Commonwealth to war with Japan. Mitsui wrote the Minister of National Defence on behalf of Japanese-Canadian veterans pledging "their unflinching loyalty to Canada as they did in the Last Great War". Nevertheless, existing anti-Japanese discrimination only increased as Japan became a war enemy, exacerbated by reports of the brutality of the Japanese forces in Hong Kong. Japanese Canadians were labelled enemy aliens and suspected of spying for the Empire of Japan.

The Canadian government declined Mitsui's offer of military service. A series of Orders in Council in 1942 deprived Canadians of Japanese descent of their property and rights, culminating in Japanese-Canadian internment for the duration of the war. The government confiscated the Mitsui family's 17-acre property and poultry facilities in Coquitlam and sold it off, compensating the family with an estimated one-third of its total value. The RCMP took Mitsui and his daughter Lucy to Hastings Park for registration as an enemy alien. Mitsui wore his military medals and when the registering official asked him, "What can I do for you, Sarge?", Mitsui responded, "What are you doing to me? I served my country. You've taken everything away from me. ... What are the good of my medals?" He scattered his medals on the floor and table, and refused to wear them thereafter when they were returned to him. He and his family were detained in a facility in Greenwood, British Columbia. Mitsui later stated, "I had complete confidence in the government that they wouldn't be doing anything to me because of being a veteran." All the family could later retrieve was a samurai sword Mitsui's son George had buried.

=== Later life ===
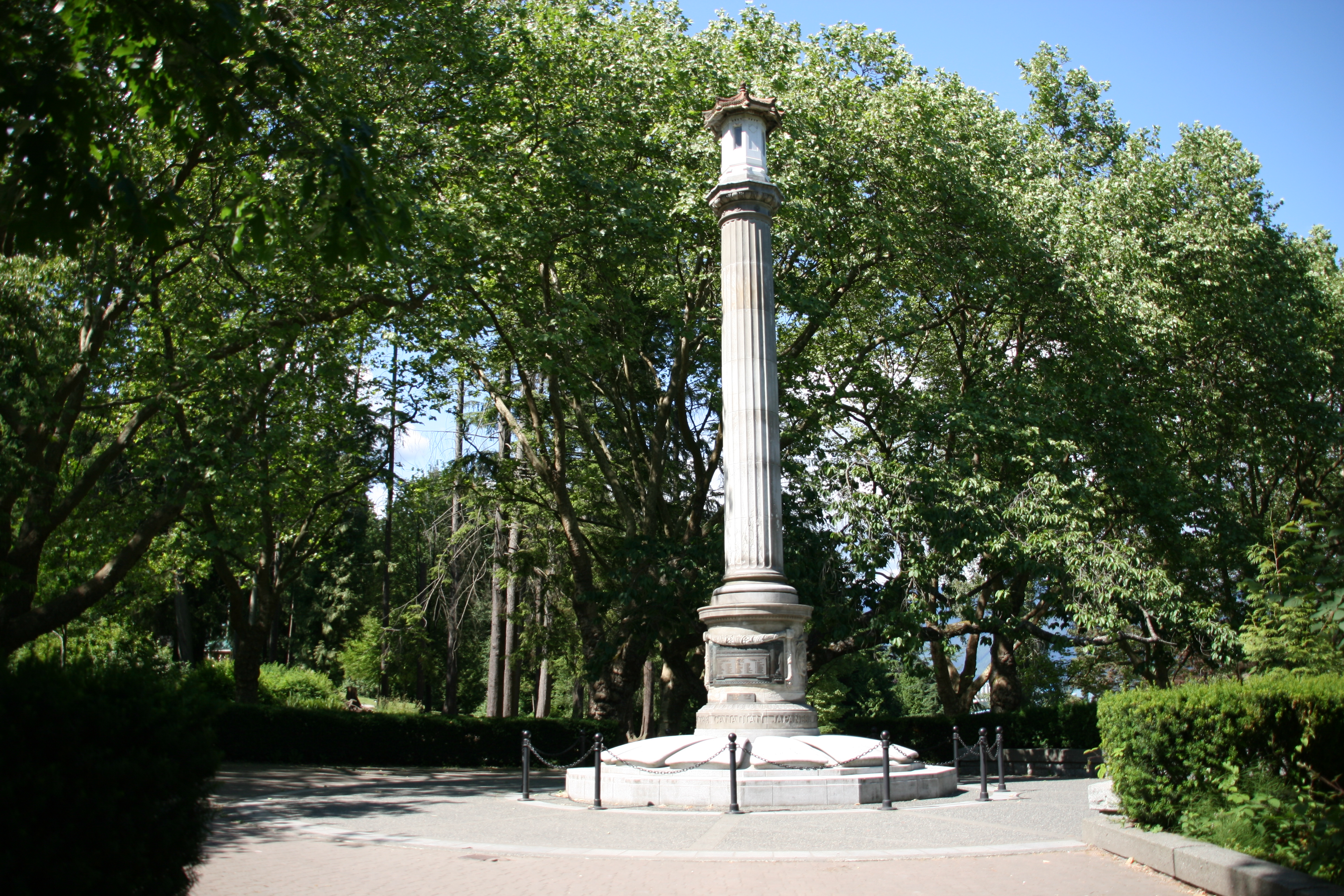
The Japanese Canadian War Memorial in Vancouver's Stanley Park, erected in honour of Japanese Canadians who served in World War I

In 1946 Mitsui and the other remaining 33 Japanese-Canadian veterans of World War I petitioned the Canadian government to restore their civil rights, but the National Emergency Transitional Powers Act passed in 1945 only increased the restrictions. Interned Japanese Canadians were given the option of repatriation to Japan or relocation east of the Rocky Mountains; Mitsui opted to move with his family to Southern Ontario. After staying in a hostel in Toronto they moved to a peach farm in St. Catharines before settling in Hamilton. On Remembrance Day each year Mitsui dressed himself in his uniform and medals and stayed at home, refusing to take part in public services.

Mitsui was a guest at the ceremony to relight the lamp on the Japanese Canadian War Memorial in Vancouver's Stanley Park on 2 August 1985; the lamp had been extinguished in 1942. The 98-year-old Mitsui stated in an interview: "I've done my last duty to my comrades. They are gone but not forgotten." He was the last surviving member of the 228 Japanese-Canadian veterans of World War I when he died on 22 April 1987.

== Personal life ==
Mitsui and his wife Sugiko had four children: two girls, Lucy and Amy; and two boys, George (the eldest) and Harry (the youngest). During the war, the girls were sent to Alberta, where they went to school, George went to Ontario, and only Harry stayed with his parents. Mitsui bequeathed his medals to his grandson David, who wore them to an exhibit dedicated to the Japanese-Canadian veterans of World War I at the Calgary Highlanders Museum on 12 March 1994.
