= Pacific Northwest canoes =

Canoes made on the Pacific Northwest coast of North America

Masterfully designed canoes of many sizes and forms were made on the Pacific Northwest coast of North America. They were the main form of transportation for the indigenous people of the area until long after European colonization. In recent years, the craft of canoe-making has been revived, and a few have been built by a number of the native nations. Like those made in traditional times, they have proved eminently seaworthy.

== Construction ==
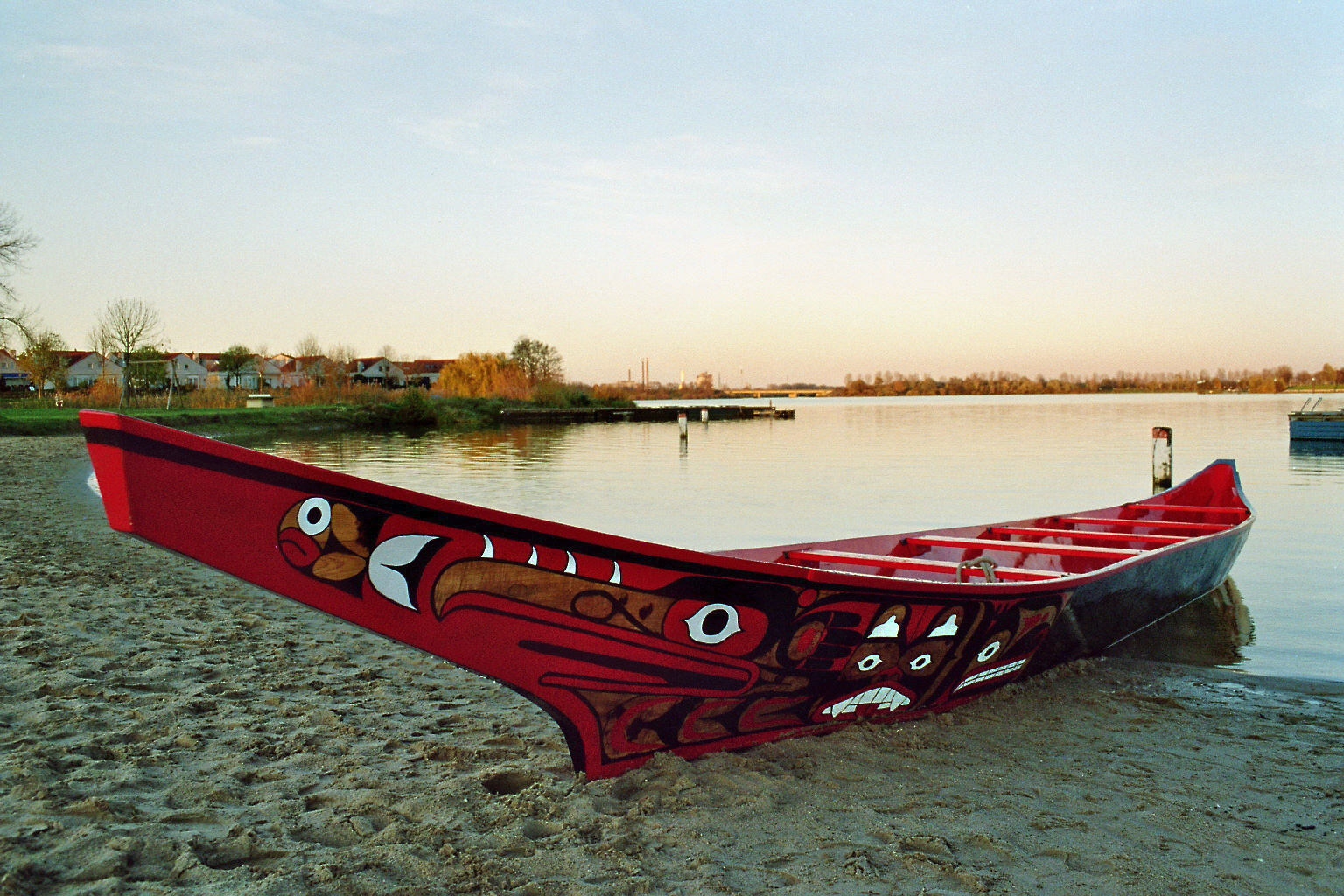
A seagoing dugout canoe

The canoes are made by carving solid logs, usually of red cedar but in some areas of Sitka spruce or cottonwood. The boats were typically widened beyond the original diameter of the log by spreading the sides after a steam-softening process. Spreading does more than widen the canoe; it also introduces major changes of form throughout the hull which the canoemaker must anticipate when carving the log. The straight and level gunwales bend smoothly out and down, while the ends rise, forming a graceful sheer and transforming a rigidly narrow, hollow trough into an elegant watercraft.

In order to spread without splitting, the walls of the hull are made remarkably thin. When the hull is completely carved, water is poured into it to a depth of six inches or so, and heated to boiling with red-hot rocks. The resulting steam is confined by covering the open hull with mats. The hot rocks are replaced as needed to keep the water at a boil. The softened sides, heated through by the steam inside and fires outside, begin to move outward, aided by the weight of water and rocks pressing down in the centre. Spreading sticks are tapped into place between the gunwales, and are moved towards the ends and increased in length in the centre as the sides flare outward. When the planned beam and form are reached, the canoe is allowed to cool, the water is removed, and the thwarts, bow and stern blocks, and gunwale caps are fitted and fastened in place.

Large travelling and war canoes were often painted with designs associated with the names of the canoes or the crests of the owners.

== Uses ==
The canoes were used for transport up and down the coast. They were used for trading, as war canoes, in competitions, and for fishing. Emily Carr, who grew up in the early days of Victoria, British Columbia, describes a regatta in which the Indian races were the highlight. The canoes, of ten paddlers and a steersman acting as coxswain, "flash[ed] through their races like running fire." The Kloochman ("wife" in Chinook Jargon) was "an even grander race" than the men's, with the women giving "every scrap of themselves to the canoe", working in complete unity.

== Historical examples ==
The Haida of Haida Gwaii reputedly made the biggest ones - some 60 feet (18 metres) long.

== Modern examples ==
In 1937 Betty Lowman Carey became the first white woman to row single-handed the Inside Passage of British Columbia in a dugout canoe.

In 1978 Geordie Tocher and two companions sailed a 3½ ton, 40 foot (12 metre) dugout canoe (the Orenda II), made of Douglas Fir, and based on Haida designs (but with sails), from Vancouver, Canada to Hawaii to add credibility to stories that the Haida had travelled to Hawaii in ancient times. Altogether they travelled some 4,500 miles (7,242 km) after two months at sea.

In 1986 Bill Reid created Loo Taas, a 15.2-metre-long red cedar ocean-going canoe commissioned for Expo 86 in Vancouver. After Reid designed the canoe, it was built in Skidegate by a group of carvers led by Tucker (Robert) Brown during the winter of 1985/86. The bow and stern of Loo Taas have a killer whale design conceived and painted by Haida artist Sharon Hitchcock (1951–2009). In addition to its presence at Expo 86, Loo Taas was brought to Rouen, France, in 1989, and was paddled by a Haida delegation up the Seine River to be exhibited at the Musée de l’homme in Paris.
