= Japanese Canadian War Memorial =

War memorial in Vancouver, British Columbia, Canada

- Canada
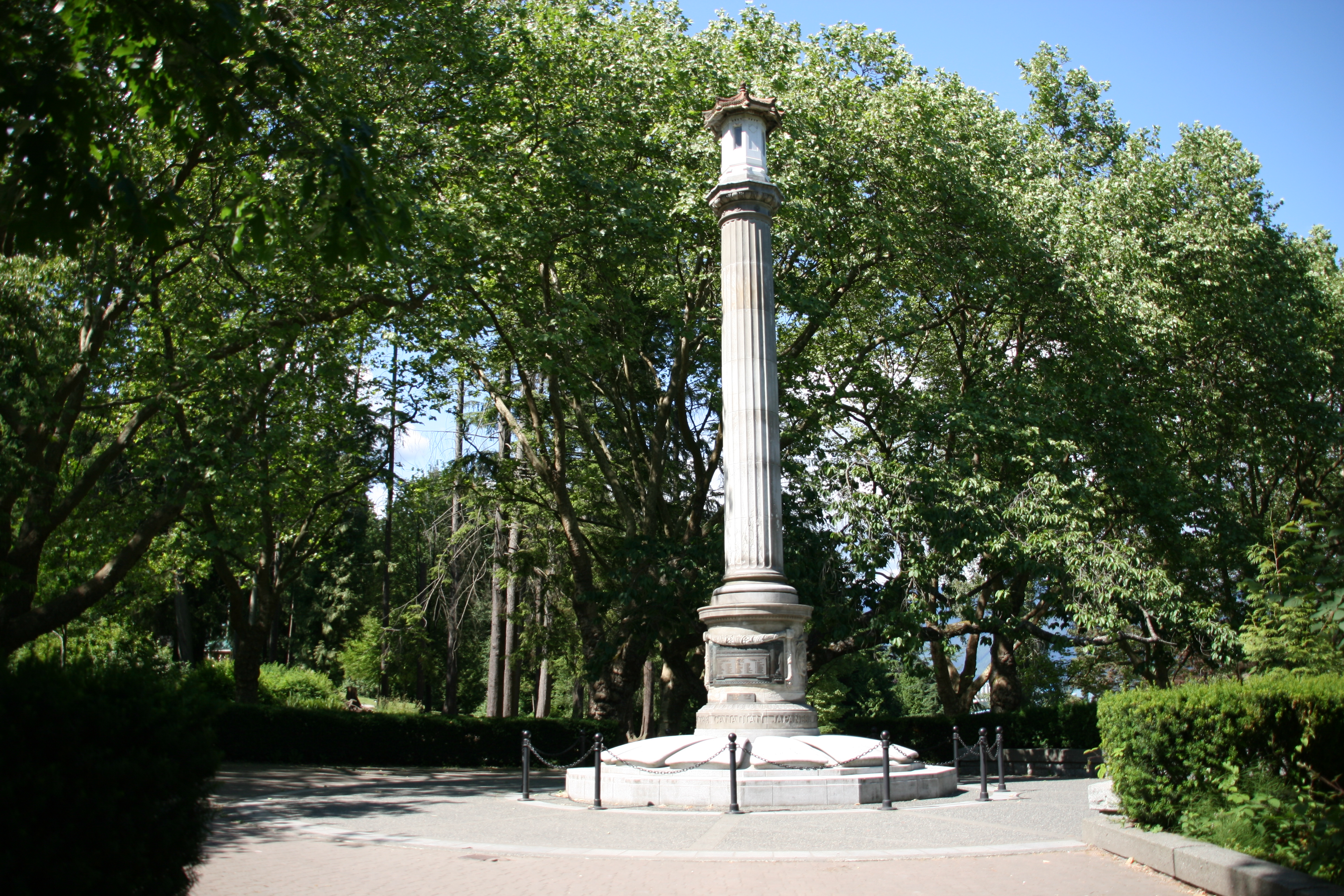
- The memorial in 2009
- For Those who fought for freedom & democracy in WWI and those who volunteered and died in WWII
- Location: 49°18′04″N 123°07′55″W; Stanley Park, Vancouver, British Columbia, Canada

The Japanese Canadian War Memorial is located at Stanley Park in Vancouver, British Columbia.

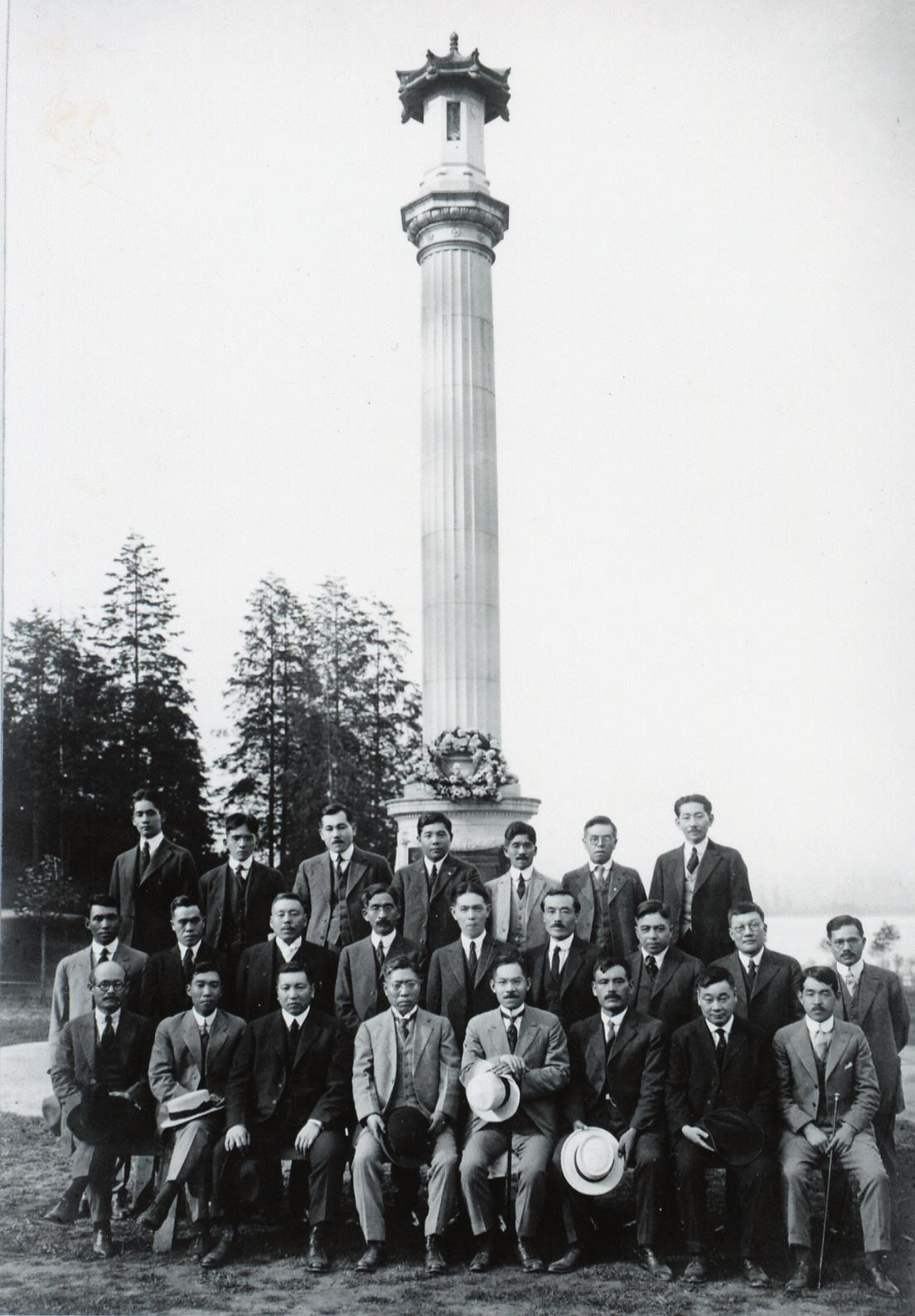
Founding members of the Canadian Japanese Association at the memorial, c. 1920
