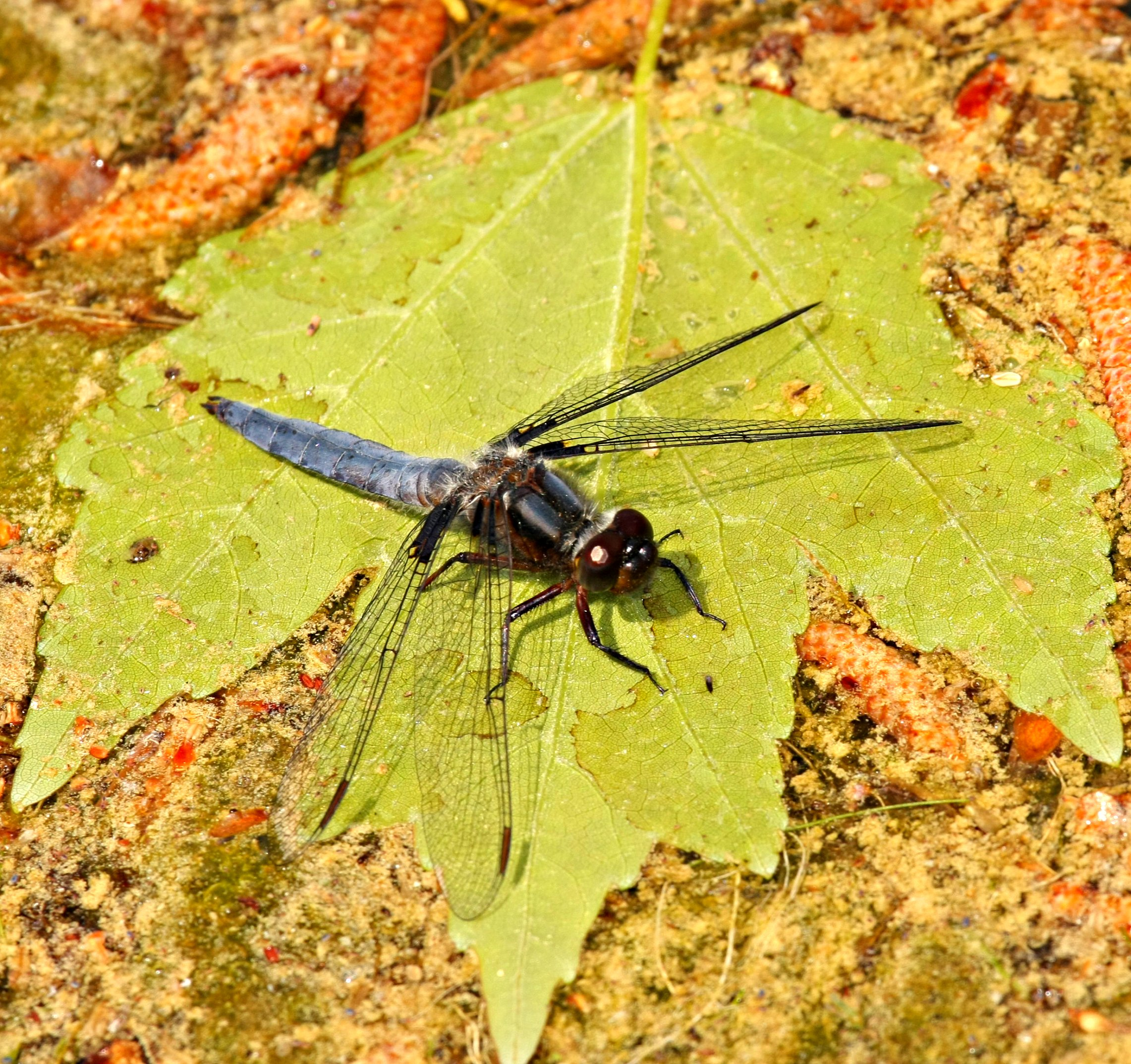
- Male

Scientific classification
- Kingdom: Animalia
- Phylum: Arthropoda
- Class: Insecta
- Order: Odonata
- Infraorder: Anisoptera
- Family: Libellulidae
- Genus: Ladona
- Species: L. deplanata

Binomial name
- Ladona deplanata (Rambur, 1842)

Synonyms
- Libellula deplanata

= Blue corporal =

Species of dragonfly

The blue corporal (Ladona deplanata), also known as little corporal, is a dragonfly in the Libellulidae, or skimmer family. First described as Libellula deplanata by Jules Pierre Rambur in 1842, it is common across much of the eastern United States.

== Taxonomy ==
When Jules Pierre Rambur first described the blue corporal in 1842, he assigned it to the large skimmer genus Libellula. There it remained until 1897, when James George Needham established the genus Ladona, and transferred the blue corporal (and several other species) to it. Taxonomists have disagreed since as to which genus the dragonfly should be assigned to, with some subsuming members of the genus Ladona into Libellula, and others maintaining the two genera. However, recent molecular DNA studies strongly suggest that Ladona is a monophyletic group which is a sister taxon to Libellula. The blue corporal has, in the past, been considered to be a subspecies of the closely related white corporal.

The etymology of the genus name Ladona is unknown, but the specific name deplanata, meaning "flattened" or "expanded", probably refers to the shape of the blue corporal's abdomen. The word "blue" in its common name refers to the male's coloration, while the word "corporal" refers to two lines on the dragonfly's thorax; in the US military, those with the rank of corporal wear two stripes on their uniforms.

== Description ==
The blue corporal is a small, thickset dragonfly, measuring 29–40 mm (1.1–1.6 in) in length. The male has a dark brown thorax with two wide, bluish, pruinose stripes on the front and a pruinose blue abdomen. His face is black, and his eyes dark brown. The female is brown, with a narrow, pale stripe and an equally narrow black strip on each side of the thorax, and a black dorsal stripe down the center of her abdomen, broadening toward the posterior. Her face and eyes are brown. Both sexes have clear wings with short black streaks at the base, often with a smaller amber streak between them.

=== Similar species ===
The chalk-fronted corporal is larger, and shows a basal spot on the hindwing, rather than the streaks shown by the blue corporal; the adult male chalk-fronted corporal has a white (rather than black) face. The male eastern pondhawk has completely clear wings (with no basal streaks) and green eyes, while the male blue dasher is slimmer, with green eyes and a white face. The male little blue dragonlet is smaller, with clear wings and white cerci.

== Habitat, distribution and range ==
The blue corporal is common and widespread throughout the eastern United States. Its range extends from Oklahoma to New Hampshire in the north, south to Texas and Florida. It favors the still, infertile waters of sandy-bottomed ponds, lakes and pits, and breeds less frequently in streams than its close relatives do.

== Behavior ==
Unlike most skimmers—and indeed most dragonflies—the blue corporal typically perches on the ground, though it will sometimes cling vertically to sunlit trees during the late afternoon. Males spend much of their time patrolling the edges of ponds and lakes, resting on banks, low vegetation or floating debris between flights. Unless they are mating or laying eggs, females spend little time near the water. The blue corporal's flight is low and fluttering, occasionally interrupted by hovering.

Like all odonates, the blue corporal is predatory. As larval instars, they prey primarily on midge and mayfly larvae; they are also known to take ostracods and cladocerans, though these make up only a very small percentage of their diet. As adults, they hunt flying insects, taking primarily small flies, beetles and leafhoppers. They are "sally hunters", making quick, short flights after prey from a perch on or near the ground.

The blue corporal has a single brood per year. It mates on the wing. The female, guarded by the male, who hovers above her, deposits her eggs immediately after mating, dipping her abdomen into the water to do so. She spreads her eggs out, spacing them several meters apart around the perimeter of a pond; overall, she lays few eggs in any one site. The young develop synchronously, which increases the amount of intraspecific competition between them. The blue corporal overwinters as a final instar nymph, and the entire population of an area emerges over a one-month period in early spring. The flight period varies with latitude. For example, it flies from November to May in Florida, while in Louisiana it flies from February to May. Further north, it emerges later. In South Carolina, it flies from late March until early May, while in Kansas it flies from April to May. In Ohio and Kentucky, it flies from April to June, and in New Jersey, it flies from April to July.

== Conservation and threats ==
The International Union for Conservation of Nature has not officially assessed the blue corporal's status, but the dragonfly is said to be common across its range. Like all dragonflies, it faces a variety of threats. As instars, blue corporals are preyed upon by fish; studies have shown that, in response, they tend to use cover more. Larval mortality ranges from 90–97% annually.
