= Aether =

Aether, æther or ether may refer to:

== Historical science and mythology ==
- Aether (mythology), the personification of the bright upper sky
- Aether (classical element), the material believed to fill the universe above the terrestrial sphere
- Aether theories, proposing space-filling substance that propagates electromagnetic or gravitational forces
  - Luminiferous aether, the postulated medium for the propagation of light

== Science and engineering ==
- Ether, a class of chemical compounds
  - Diethyl ether, or simply ether, an organic compound
- Petroleum ether, a petroleum fraction (not classified as an ether)
- AETHER, an atmospheric radiative transfer algorithm
- Efir, now called "Sfera," is a telecommunication project of the Russian Federation aiming to create a national Satellite constellation

== Arts, entertainment and media ==
=== Fictional elements ===
- Aether, a plot device of the Marvel Cinematic Universe Infinity Stones
- Aether, an ancient variety of entities present in Brandon Sanderson's cosmere universe

=== Gaming ===
- Aether (video game), 2008
- The Aether (video game mod), a 2011 mod for the video game Minecraft that adds a new dimension
- Aether, the male version of the main protagonist of the 2020 video game Genshin Impact
- Aether, an object in Aion (video game)
- Aether, an element of the Kaladesh expansion block of Magic: The Gathering
- Aether, a fictional planet in 2004 video game Metroid Prime 2: Echoes
- Aether, an element in 2012 video game Phantasy Star Online 2
- The Aether, an underground mini-biome in 2011 video game Terraria
- Ether, the building block of life in the Xenoblade universe
- Ether, one of the five attributes in 2024 video game Zenless Zone Zero

=== Music ===
==== Artists ====
- Ether (band), Welsh rock band 1996–1999
- Æther Realm American heavy metal band. (2010-Now)

==== Albums ====
- Aether (album), by The Necks, 2001
- Ether (Babble album), 1996
- Ether (B.o.B album), 2017
- Ether (Fischer-Z album), 2002

==== Songs ====
- "Ether" (song), 2001, by American rapper Nas
- "Ether", by Gang of Four from the 1979 album Entertainment!
- "Ether", by Nothingface from the 2003 album Skeletons
- "Aether", by In Hearts Wake from the 2015 album Skydancer
- "Ether", a 2016 single by Make Them Suffer
- "Aether", by Worm Shepherd from the 2020 album In the Wake ov Sòl
- "Ether", by Arca from the 2021 album Kick IIIII

== Other uses ==
- Aether Industries, an Indian chemical manufacturing company
- Ether (prophet), a Book of Mormon prophet
- Ether, North Carolina, a place in the US
- Ether, a cryptocurrency generated in accordance with the Ethereum protocol

== See also ==
- Aethyr (disambiguation)
- Aither (disambiguation)
- Ethereal (disambiguation)
- Ethernet, a computer communications technology
