= Stanley Park Ecology Society =

Non-profit organization in Vancouver, British Columbia

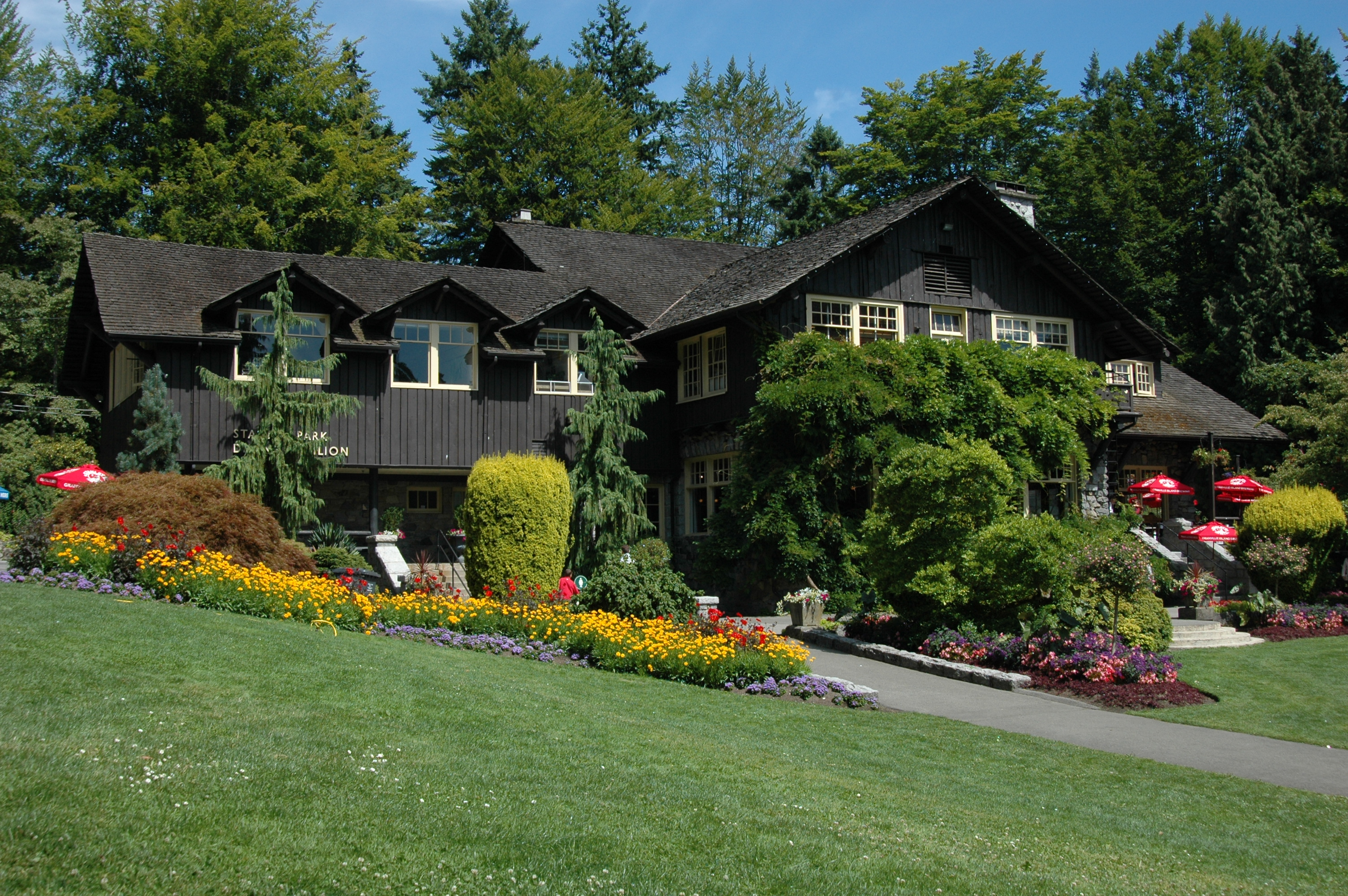
- Stanley Park Ecology Society main office
- Type: Non-profit
- Industry: Urban ecological conservation and stewardship
- Founded: Vancouver, British Columbia (1988; 38 years ago)
- Headquarters: Stanley Park, Vancouver, British Columbia
- Website: www.stanleyparkecology.ca

The Stanley Park Ecology Society (SPES) is a non-profit organization based in Vancouver, British Columbia. The society works alongside the Vancouver Board of Parks and Recreation to promote education, stewardship and conservation in Stanley Park.

== History ==
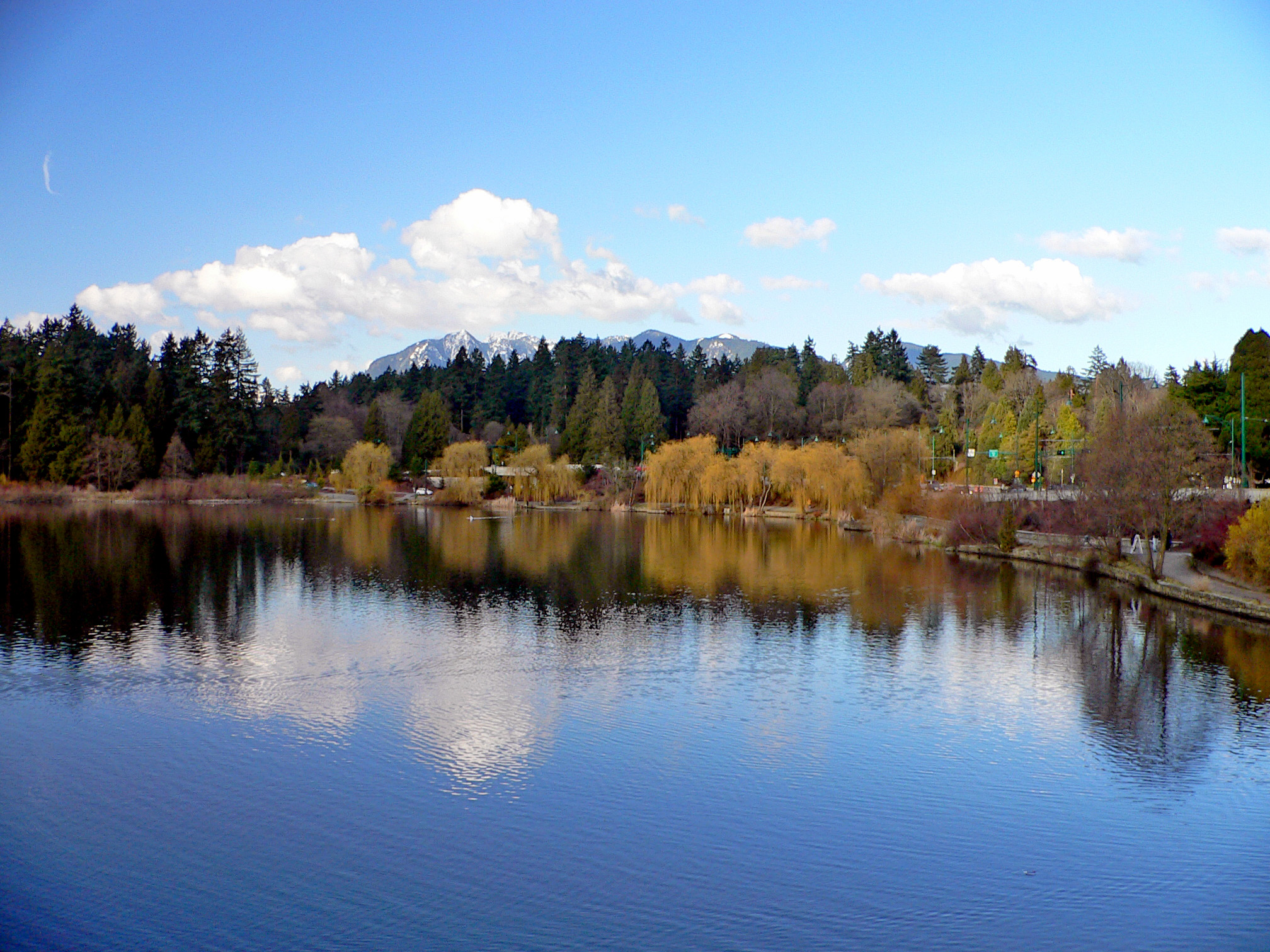
Stanley Park's Lost Lagoon, one of the main sites the SPES is responsible for

The Society was formed in 1988 by ecologists and residents in order to upgrade the facilities of the Stanley Park Zoo, which led to the creation of the Stanley Park Zoological Society (SPZS). They were responsible for leading conservation programs for threatened species and provided nature education. The Park's Nature House was converted from a boathouse on the Lost Lagoon and they turned it into one of their headquarters and is Vancouver’s only existing ecology centre.

Vancouver residents had voted to phase out the zoo in 1993 and, as a result, the SPZS renamed itself the Stanley Park Ecology Society (SPES). Following the closure of the Park's zoo in 1997, the SPES shifted towards conservation and nature education programs while providing ecological advice to the board.

== Staff ==
The SPES is overseen by a volunteer board of around 14 to 15 members. The staff includes the following: executive director, conservation programs manager, school programs manager, volunteer coordinator and nature house interpreter, fundraising and communications specialist, urban wildlife coordinator, conservation technician and stewardship coordinator. However, the majority of people involved with the SPES are volunteers.

== Facilities ==
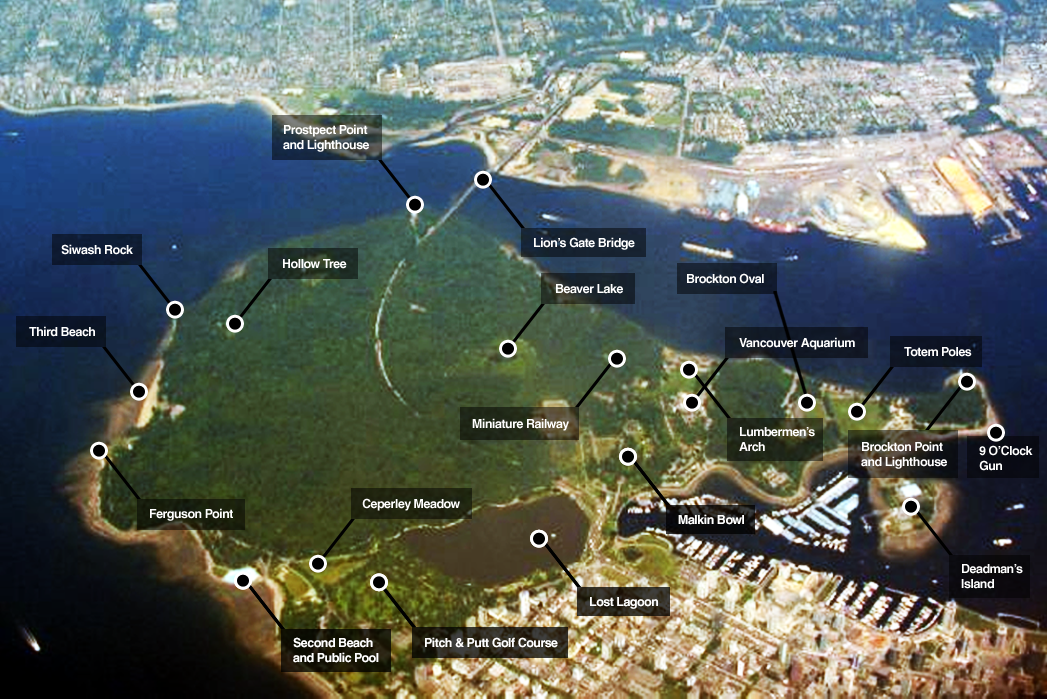
Map of Stanley Park. One of the three SPES facilities is located at Lost Lagoon and the remaining two are just west of the Vancouver Aquarium

The SPES uses three facilities provided by the Vancouver Park Board. Their main office is located on the second floor of the Stanley Park Pavilion and the other two facilities are Stanley Park Nature House (located on the Lost Lagoon where the SPES meet for their public programs) and the Earthen Architecture Cob Popcorn Stand in the Miniature Train Plaza.

== Education and Public Programming ==
The SPES offers educational programs for individuals and groups on seasonal ecology topics. This includes guided nature walks, tours, and hands-on workshops. Themes include local bird species, native and invasive plants, and intertidal ecology. The SPES also operates EcoCamps, a nature-based day camp for children age 7-11.

== Conservation ==
=== Animal conservation ===
The Society's projects include animal species monitoring to provide necessary information about the park species in order to create and update new conservation practices. Small mammals are a daily sight at Stanley Park, therefore, the SPES has created programs like Co-existing with Coyotes and Adopt A Nest.

==== Co-existing with Coyotes (CwC) ====
Beginning in 2001, the Society began work with the Provincial Ministry of Environment and the City of Vancouver to start the Co-Existing with Coyotes (CwC) public education program. After three reports of coyote attacks on children in Vancouver in 2000 as well as instances of pets being attacked and reported missing, the SPES aimed to reduce the conflict that coyotes were causing among people and pets. They provided information on how to deal with any potentially dangerous coyotes while also directly intervening with individual scenarios in a non-lethal manner.

The program had been successful for nine years in preventing and reducing the conflict between coyotes, people and pets but also in reducing the number of sightings in repeat areas. Although four children were bit between 2006 and 2009 in Surrey and Coquitlam (cities located within Metro Vancouver), no attacks occurred in Vancouver proper where the educational program exists. However, the program lost its provincial funding in 2011 and funding was since supported by only the Vancouver Park Board and school program fees. On May 16, 2013, a funding request of $19,000 in order for the SPES to expand its CwC program was denied by the Vancouver Park Board. The program expansion was estimated to cost between $55,000 and $61,000 but they were only able to obtain $42,000 from the park board and society service fees.

As a result of these outcomes, there has been an increase in coyote sightings in the Lower Mainland area of Vancouver. The SPES has a coyote sightings map on their website where users can plot sightings and see where others have been spotted.

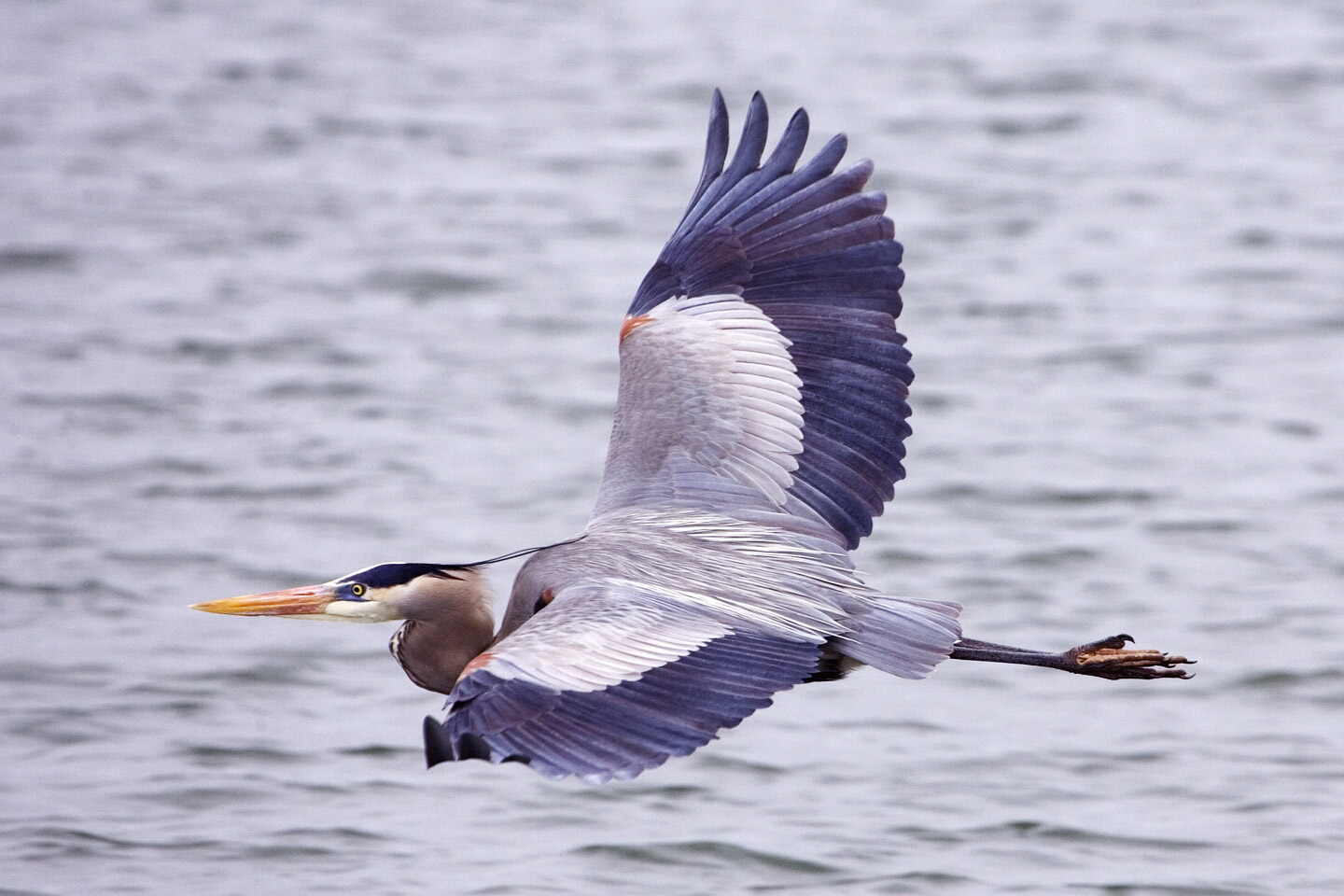
The great blue heron

==== Adopt A Nest ====
The SPES's "Adopt A Nest" program encourages people to learn more about these birds and protect their homes within the Park. The program is set up for both the great blue heron and the urban bald eagles. The program is used to raise funds for their programs for instance monitoring of the birds. Though the great blue heron has not been placed directly under the Species at Risk Act (SARA), this species has been placed on the "special concern" list. However, the subspecies of Ardea herodias fannin found primarily in British Columbia has been listed under the SARA.

=== Plant conservation ===
Vancouver is part of the coastal western hemlock biogeoclimatic zone. Therefore, Stanley Park is considered very biodiverse, with many different tree, flower, and grass species. There are many threats to these plants such as invasive species. Conservation of these species is a priority for the Society as well as the management of existing flora; for instance, the Hollow Tree is a landmark of Stanley Park that needs constant maintenance. Below are some plant species present in Stanley Park:

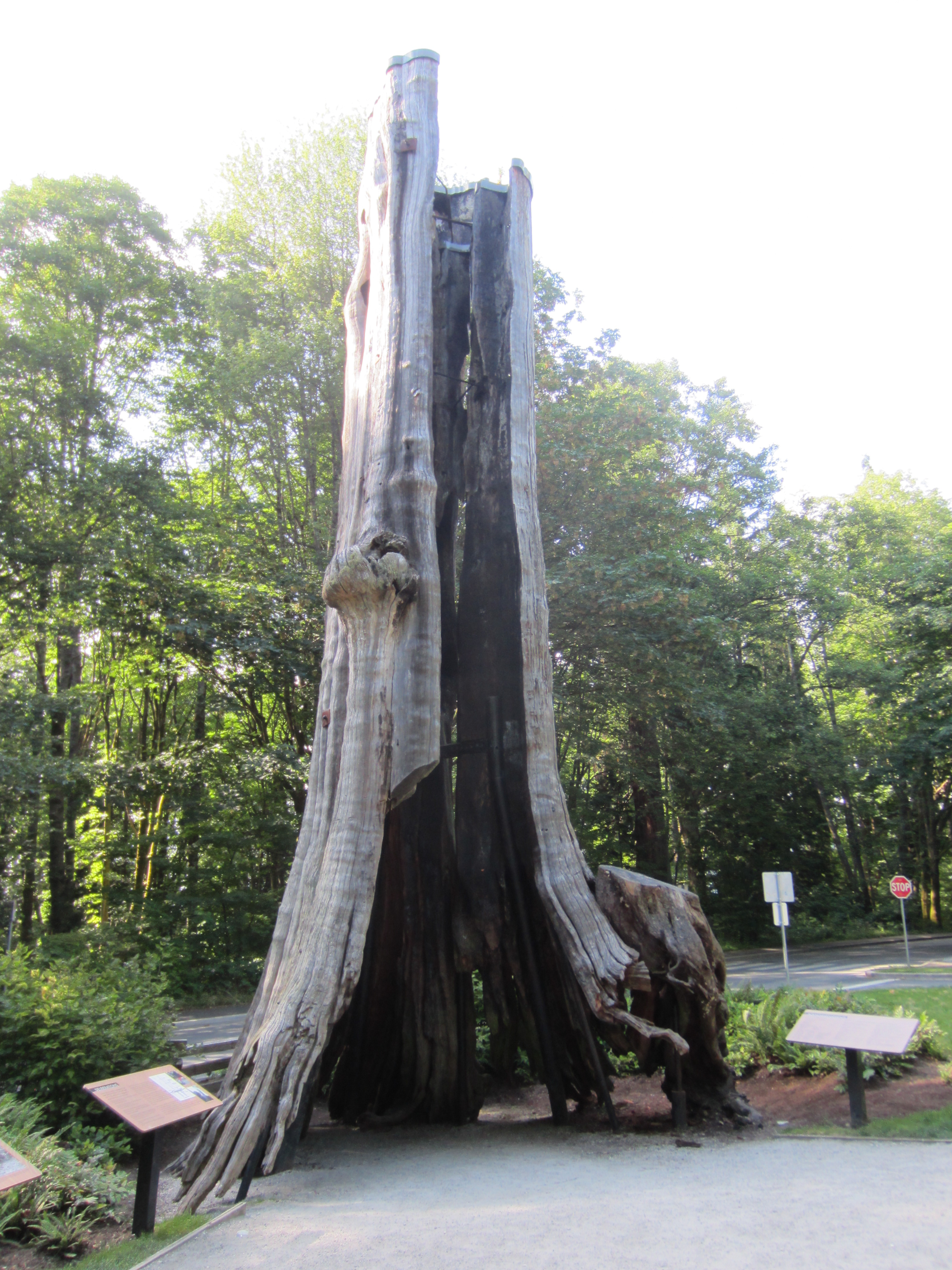
Hollow Tree, Vancouver (2013)

Trees

- Acer circinatum (vine maple)
- Acer macrophyllum (big leaf maple)
- Alnus rubra (red alder)
- Betula papyrifera (paper birch)
- Malus fusca (pacific crab apple)
- Picea sitchensis (Sitka spruce)
- Populus trichocarpa (black cottonwood)
- Prunus emarginata (bitter cherry)
- Pseudotsuga menziesii (douglas fir)
- Rhamnus purshiana (cascara)
- Taxus brevifolia (western yew)
- Thuja plicata (western red cedar)
- Tsuga heterophylla (western hemlock)

Shrubs

- Cornus stolonifera (red oiser dogwood)
- Gaultheria shallon (salal)
- Lonicera involucrata (black twinberry)
- Mahonia aquifolium (tall Oregon-grape)
- Menziesia ferruginea (false azalea)
- Oemleria cerasiformis (Indian plum)
- Oplopanax horridus (devil's club)

Ornamental plants

- Aceraceae (maple family)
- Betulaceae (birch family)
- Fagaceae (beech family)
- Rosaceae (rose family)
- Poaceae (true grass family)

== Stewardship ==
The SPES is responsible for stewardship and conservation projects in Stanley Park. They work to continually improve the habitats of the species that live there, remove invasive species, maintain the aquatic systems and to make the park more sustainable using restoration ecology and trail maintenance practices.

=== HSBC Freshwater Initiatives Revitalization Project ===
In 2012, the Society received an eco-donation of $50,000 by HSBC and created the HSBC Freshwater Initiatives. The goal is this initiative was to aid the aquatic systems of Stanley Park, including the famed Lost Lagoon. The funding enabled it to create “floating islands” for ducks and migratory birds, remove invasive species from riparian habitats, install nest boxes for birds, maintain water levels from Beaver Lake, and to create a tree wire-wrapping project to protect trees from beaver damage.

=== Beaver Lake ===
Stanley Park's Beaver Lake
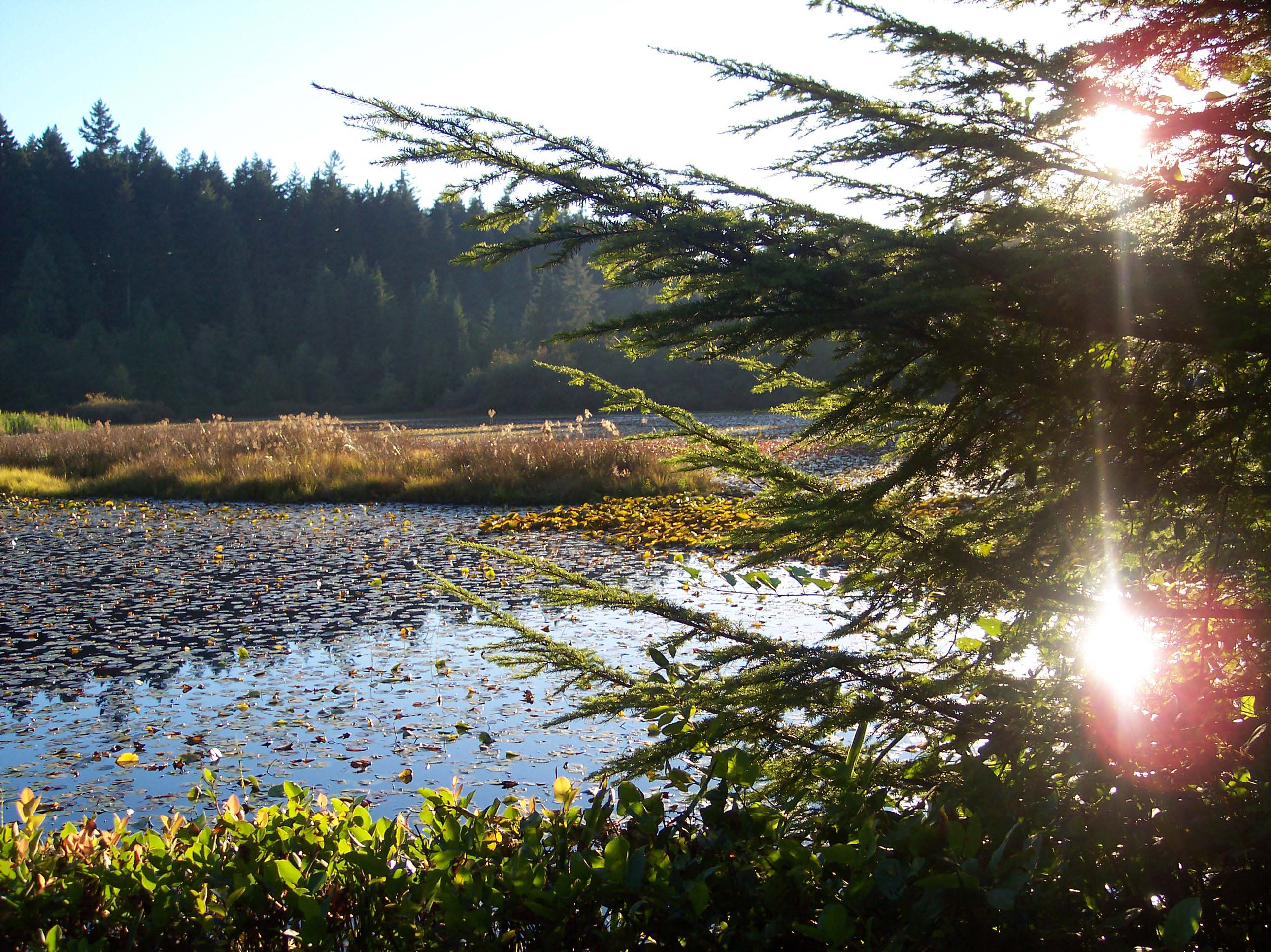
- Location: Stanley Park, Vancouver, British Columbia, Canada
- Basin countries: Canada

Stanley Park’s Beaver Lake is an important part of its ecology and a popular recreational site. However, it is becoming overrun with silt, leaving the lake’s water levels low and depleted due to clearcut logging, the introduction of invasive species such as fragrant lilies, and the construction of the Stanley Park causeway in 1938 among other trails and roads. The lake had shrunk from an area of 6.7 hectares in 1938 to 3.9 hectares in 1997 with more than 70 percent of its surface currently covered by water lilies and other plants. The lake provides a habitat for several at risk species in British Columbia, including coastal cutthroat trout, blue dasher dragonflies, and great blue herons.

In January 2011, the Stanley Park Ecological Action Plan was created and one of the main issues that needed to be addressed was the state of Beaver Lake. A part of that action called for the dredging of the lake in order to restore it as there was the threat that it would fill in completely by 2020 without intervention. It was last dredged in 1929. The planning for the enhancing of Beaver Lake is underway with open houses held by consultants AquaTerra Environmental that have already taken place to discuss its future with the public. Currently, no action plans have been made other than being made part of the Vancouver Park Board 2012-2014 Capital Plan.

=== Environmental art ===
==== Stanley Park Eco-Stewards Program ====
The Stanley Park Eco-Stewards Program was initiated to remove invasive species from Stanley Park and is based on a volunteer-run program called Ivy Busters that began in 2004. Since then, it has removed over 3.95 hectares of invasive vegetation including English Ivy. The mission is to abolish and decrease the spread of invasive species while enhancing the natural habitat and planting more native species. . This project finds a use for the unwanted biomass in a creative way to reuse and repurpose the bio materials and for people to learn more and connect with nature in a community-based way. They work in partnership with the Vancouver Park Board as well as the Stanley Park Ecology Society.

==== Restoration ====
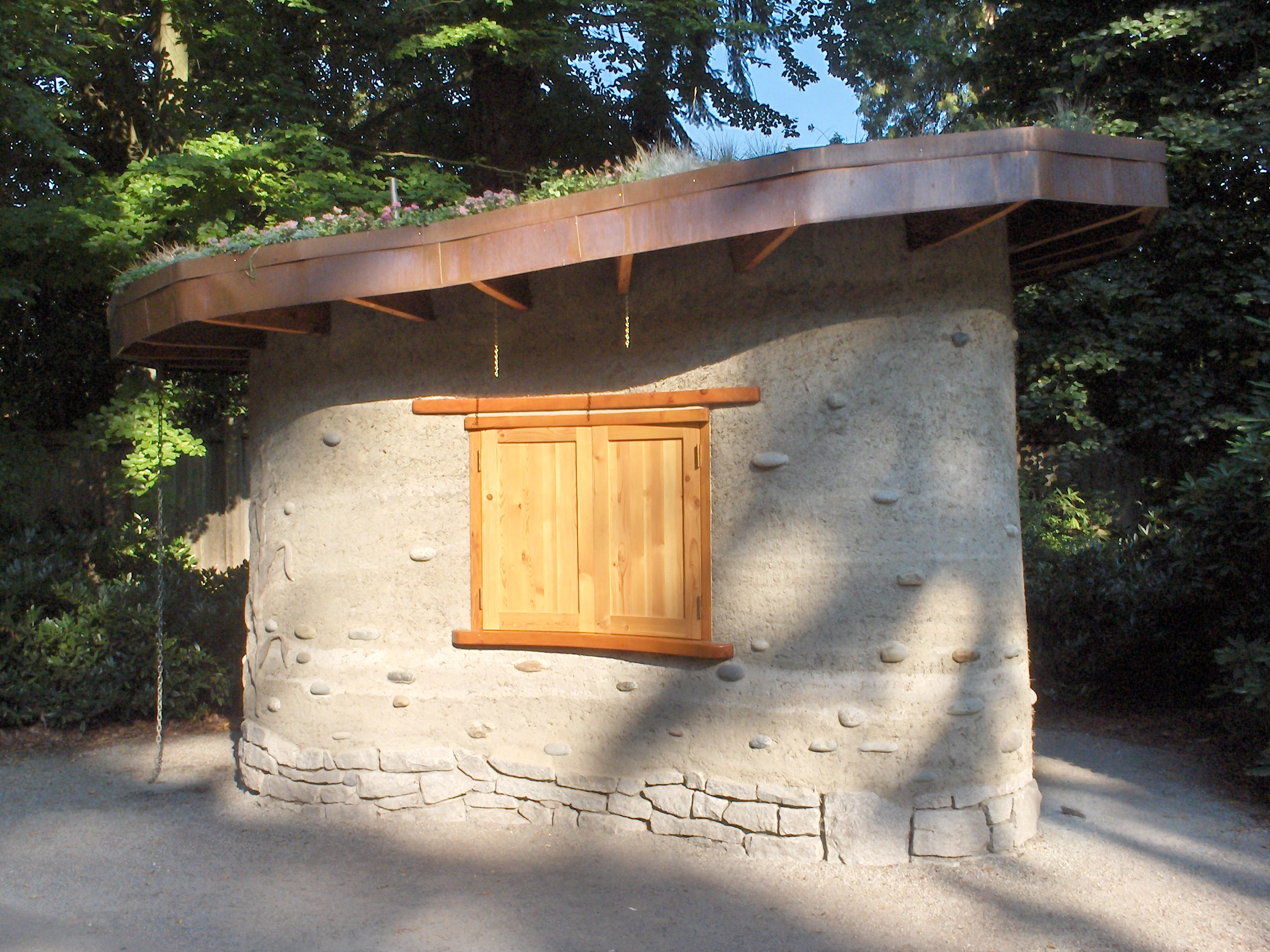
An example of a cob building, like the one located in Stanley Park

The SPES works towards using remnants of old buildings and fixtures to repurpose them for continued use with a sustainability focus and to turn them into an artistic focal point and for functional use. The Stanley Park Nature House was converted from a boathouse on the Lost Lagoon and they turned it into one of their headquarters and is Vancouver’s only existing ecology centre. The Earthen Architecture Cob Popcorn Stand in the Miniature Train Plaza was refurbished from a traditional cob building because it met the Park Board's criteria of an environmental, arts and culture, and community building. It has been upgraded as a concession stand that is also used as one of their three facilities as well as to raise money for SPES programs. Volunteers worked towards using recycled products in order to salvage the cob building and a graphic designer sculpted the exterior to add a public art touch.
