= Corporeal =

Corporeal may refer to:

- Matter (corporeal, or actual, physical substance or matter), generally considered to be a substance (often a particle) that has rest mass and (usually) also volume
- Body, of or relating to the body
- Corporeal (Altar Linen)
- A term devised by Harry Partch to describe his philosophy of musical theatre
- Corporeal mime
- Corporeal punishment

== See also ==
- Corporeal undead
- Ethereal (disambiguation)
- Corporal (disambiguation)
