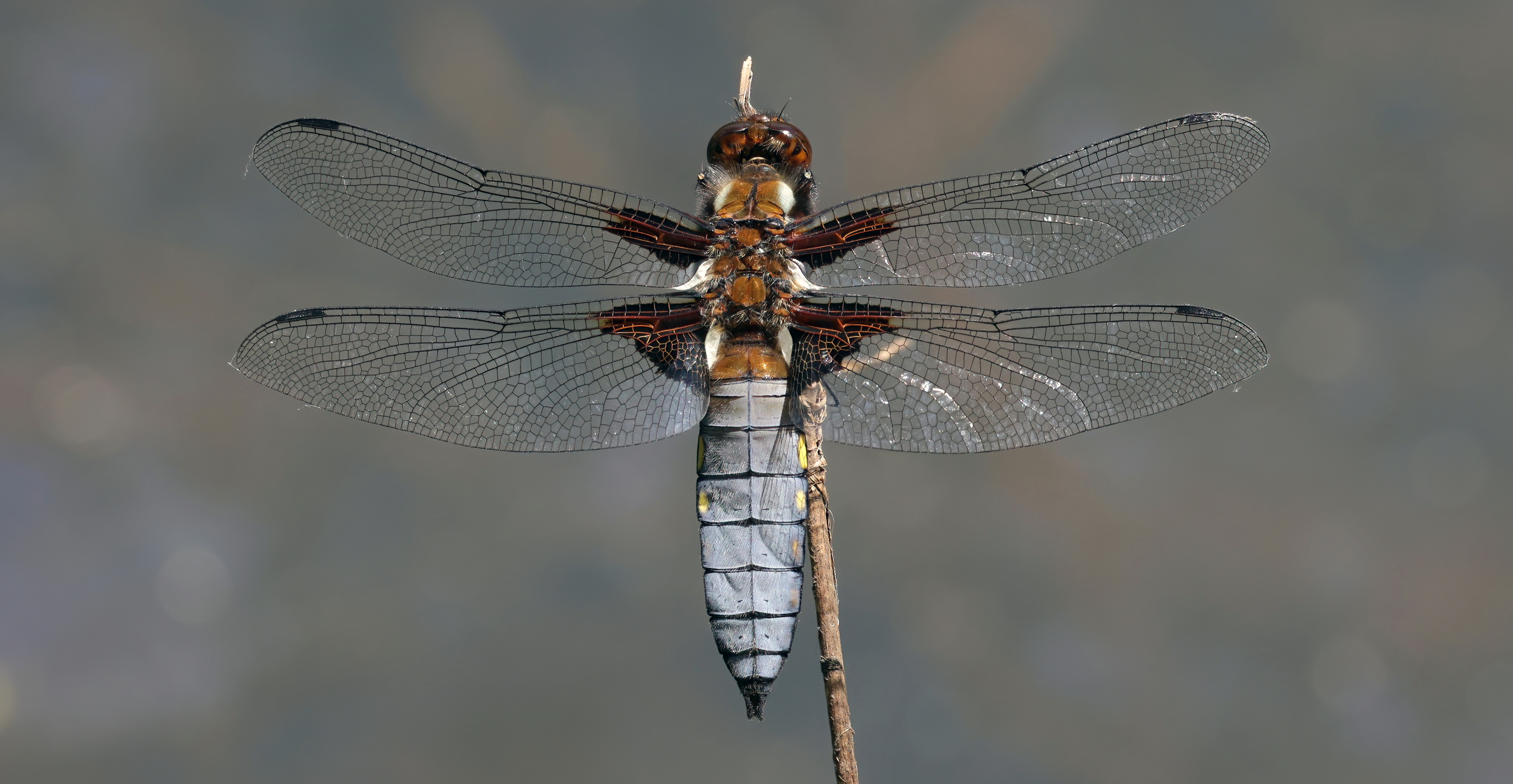
- male Wolvercote Lakes, Oxfordshire
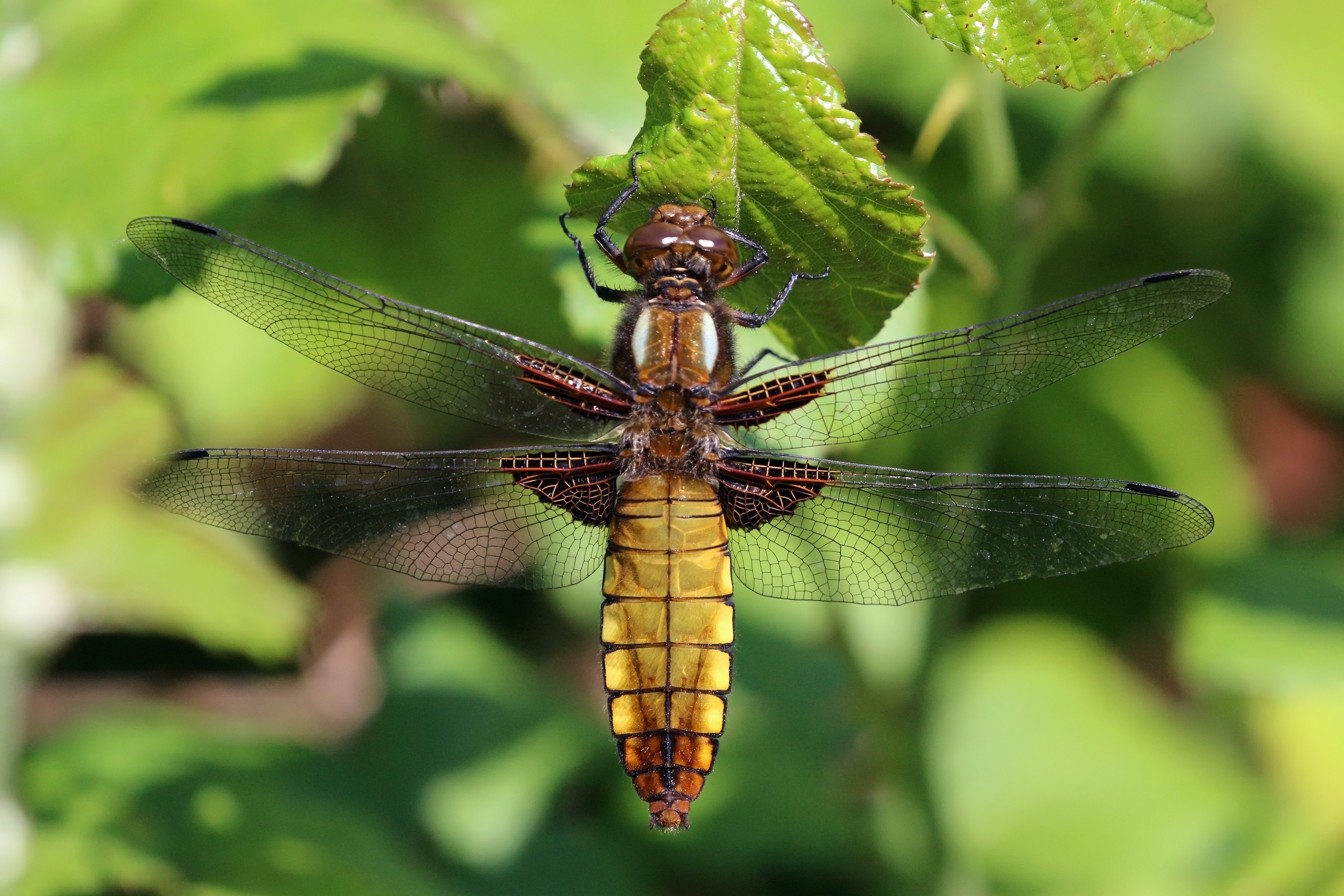
- female Otmoor, Oxfordshire

Conservation status
- Least Concern (IUCN 3.1)

Scientific classification
- Kingdom: Animalia
- Phylum: Arthropoda
- Clade: Pancrustacea
- Class: Insecta
- Order: Odonata
- Infraorder: Anisoptera
- Family: Libellulidae
- Genus: Libellula
- Species: L. depressa

Binomial name
- Libellula depressa Linnaeus, 1758

= Libellula depressa =

Broad-bodied chaser

Species of dragonfly

Libellula depressa, the broad-bodied chaser is one of the most common dragonflies in Europe and central Asia. It is very distinctive with a very broad flattened abdomen, four wing patches and, in the male, the abdomen becomes pruinose blue.

== Identification ==
This insect is around 39–48 mm in length, with both the male and the female having a broad, flattened abdomen which is brown with yellow patches down the sides. In the male, the abdomen develops a blue pruinosity that covers the brown colour. Both fore and hind wings have a dark patch at the base. Both the male and female have broad antehumeral stripes. The average wingspan is approximately 70 mm. L. depressa is very distinctive and is not easily confused with any other dragonflies in the region.

Variation in juveniles and adults

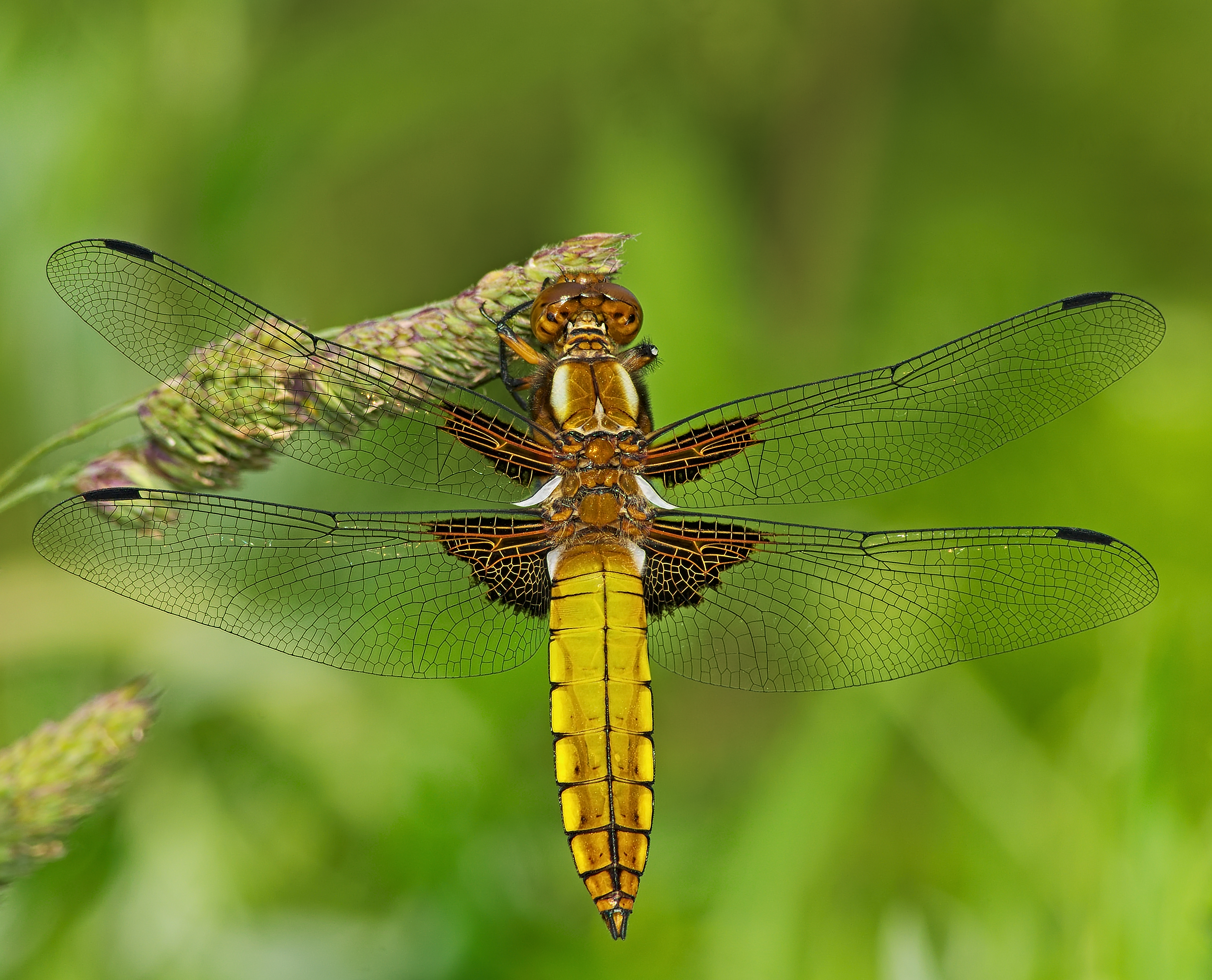
Juvenile male

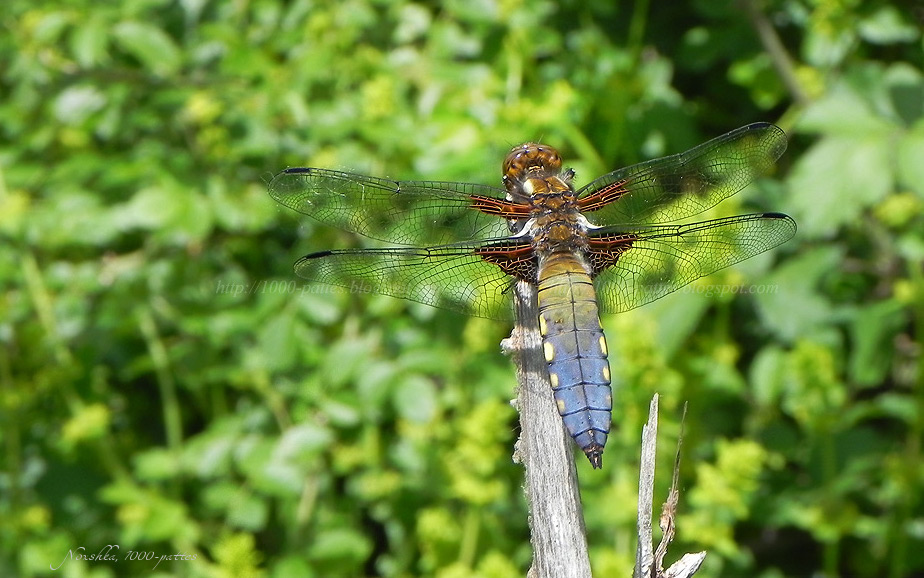
maturing male

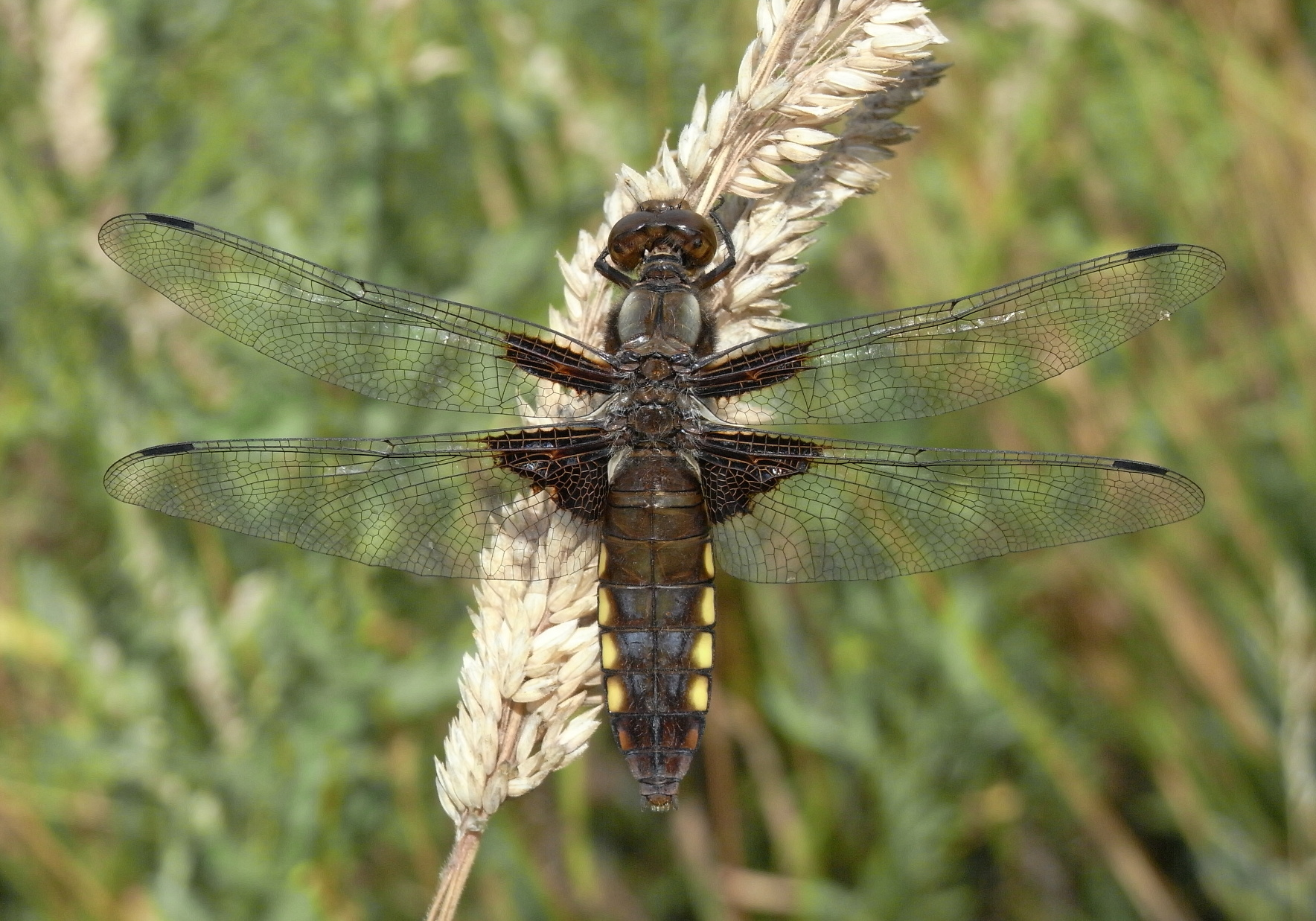
Old female; much darker than the young female

== Distribution and habitat ==
L. depressa is found in central and southern Europe, central Asia and the Middle East. Its range extends northwards throughout England and Wales and into southern Scotland, southern Sweden and southern Finland. and it occurs on some Mediterranean islands including Corsica, Sardinia, Sicily, and Menorca. Historically its range did not extend into Scotland, but it has colonised north there in recent decades. It is not found in Ireland or North Africa.

L. depressa is seen near still-water lakes and ponds, feeding on many types of small insects. They occur in both bare and sunny locations, where it is often the first dragonfly to colonise new habitats such as newly created ponds, and well vegetated ponds. L. depressa are often seen away from water as the adults are very mobile and undergo a period of maturation away from water after emergence. The adults are also migratory.

== Behaviour ==
Hunting and returning to a favoured perch

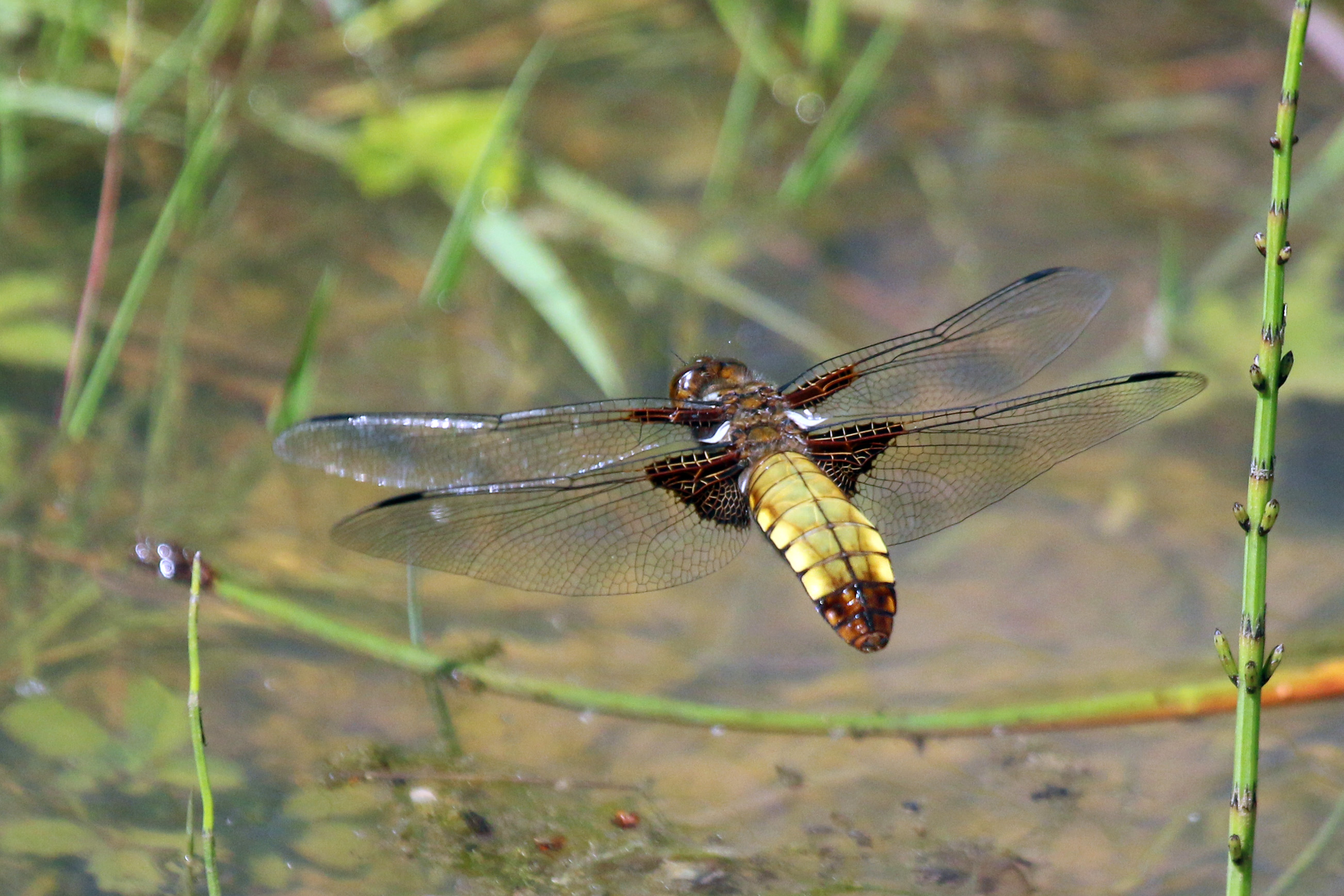
young adult female ovipositing

The flight period is from April to September but are mostly seen in May and June. Their flight is very fast as they dart and dive above the water. They are very territorial and will fight with rival males and any other dragonflies they happen to encounter. They characteristically return to a favoured perch, in the sun. When a female enters a male's territory the male will fly up and grab the female. Mating occurs on the wing and the pair are in tandem for only a brief period, often less than a minute. The pair separate and the female will find a suitable location for ovipositing, usually a stretch of open water with submerged vegetation. The female oviposits in flight, hovering above the water and dipping the tip of her abdomen in. The eggs hatch in 4 or 5 weeks and the larvae take one to two years to develop. The larvae live in the silt and detritus at the bottom of the pond, lying buried in mud with just the head and eyes showing. After emergence the adults move away from water and undergo a period of maturation which lasts 10 to 14 days.

Emergence of the imago

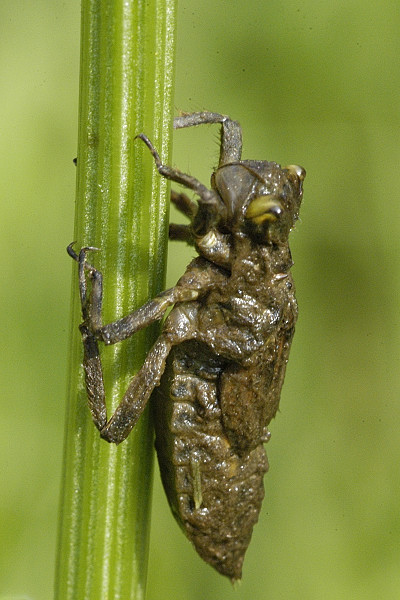
Nymph

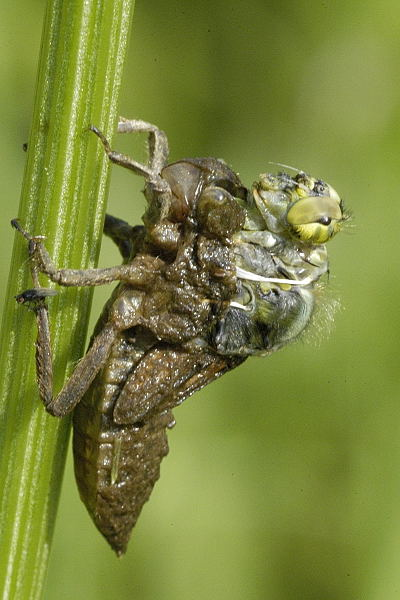
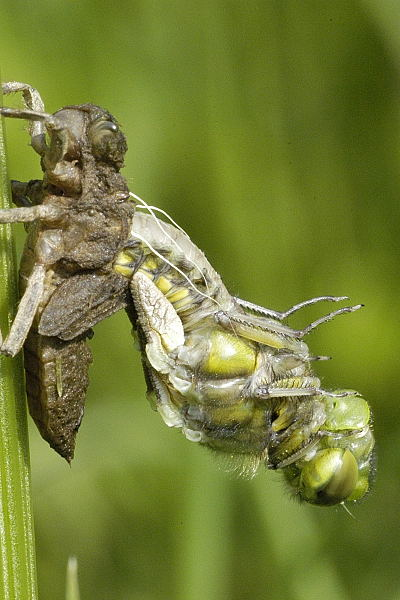
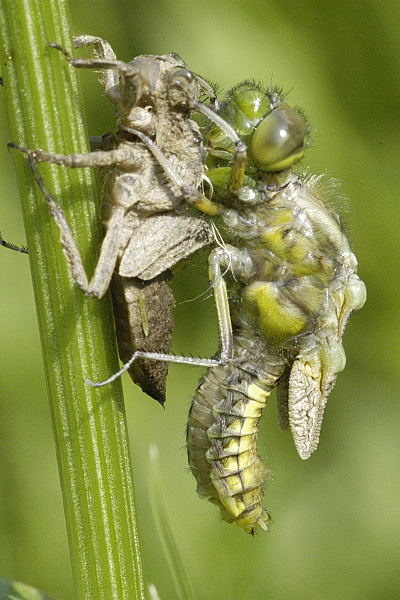

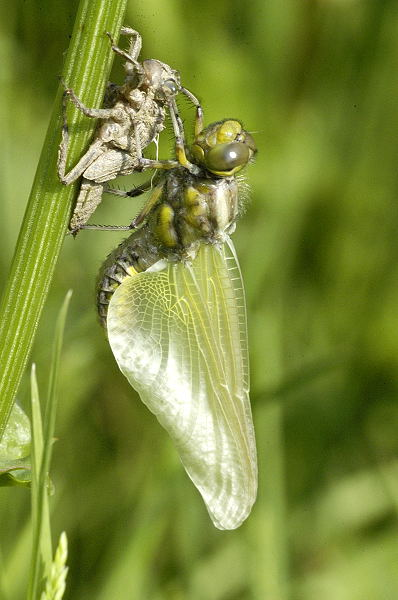
Newly emerged adult

== Systematics ==
Libellula depressa is the type species of the genus Libellula, designated by William Forsell Kirby in 1889. Consequently, the suggestion, based on RNA and DNA analysis, that this species should be placed within the genus Ladona is not valid under the principle of priority.

== See also ==
- Libellulidae
- List of British dragonflies
