= Corporal (disambiguation) =

Corporal is a rank in use (in some form) by most armies.

Corporal may also refer to:

- Corporal punishment, a form of physical punishment involving the use of pain
- MGM-5 Corporal, the first guided missile authorised by the US to carry a nuclear warhead
- Corporal (liturgy), a piece of white linen used during Mass
- WAC Corporal, a sounding rocket developed at White Sands Missile Range
- Corporal Kirchner, an American professional wrestler
- Corporal Robinson, an American professional wrestler
- Corporal Punishment (wrestler), an American professional wrestler
- Isadore Schwartz, an American world champion flyweight boxer known as "Corporal Izzy"
- Ladona, a genus of dragonflies often treated as part of the genus Libellula

== See also ==
- Corporeal
