= Lost Lagoon =

Lagoon in British Columbia, Canada

Coordinates: 49.295954°N 123.140559°W

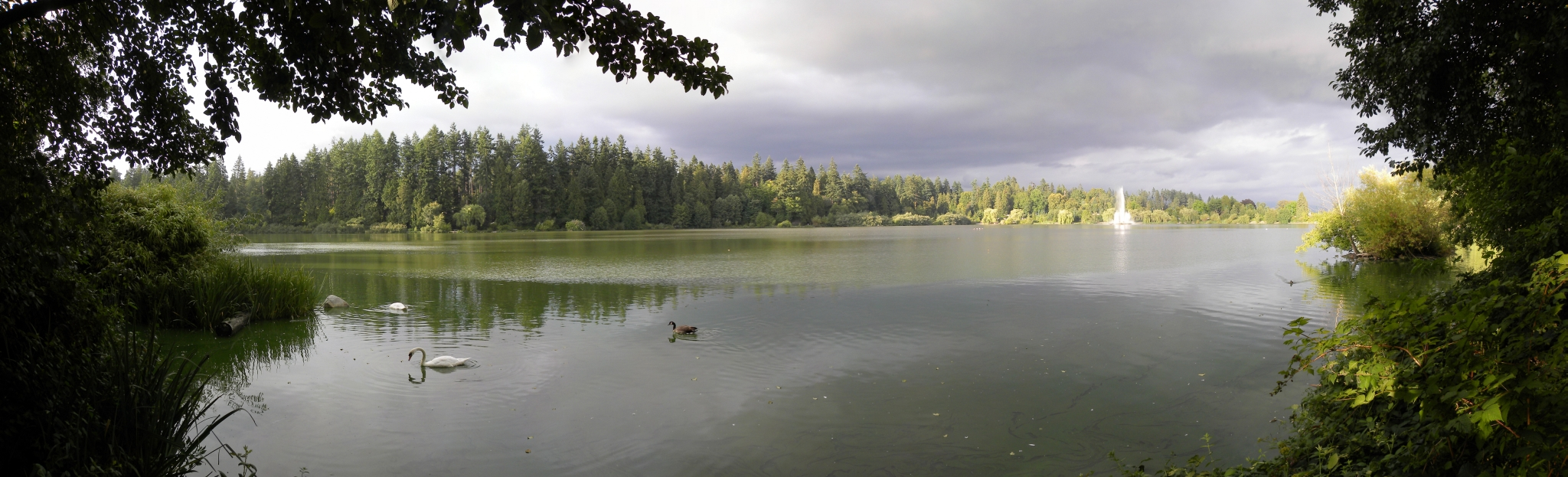
Panorama of Lost Lagoon

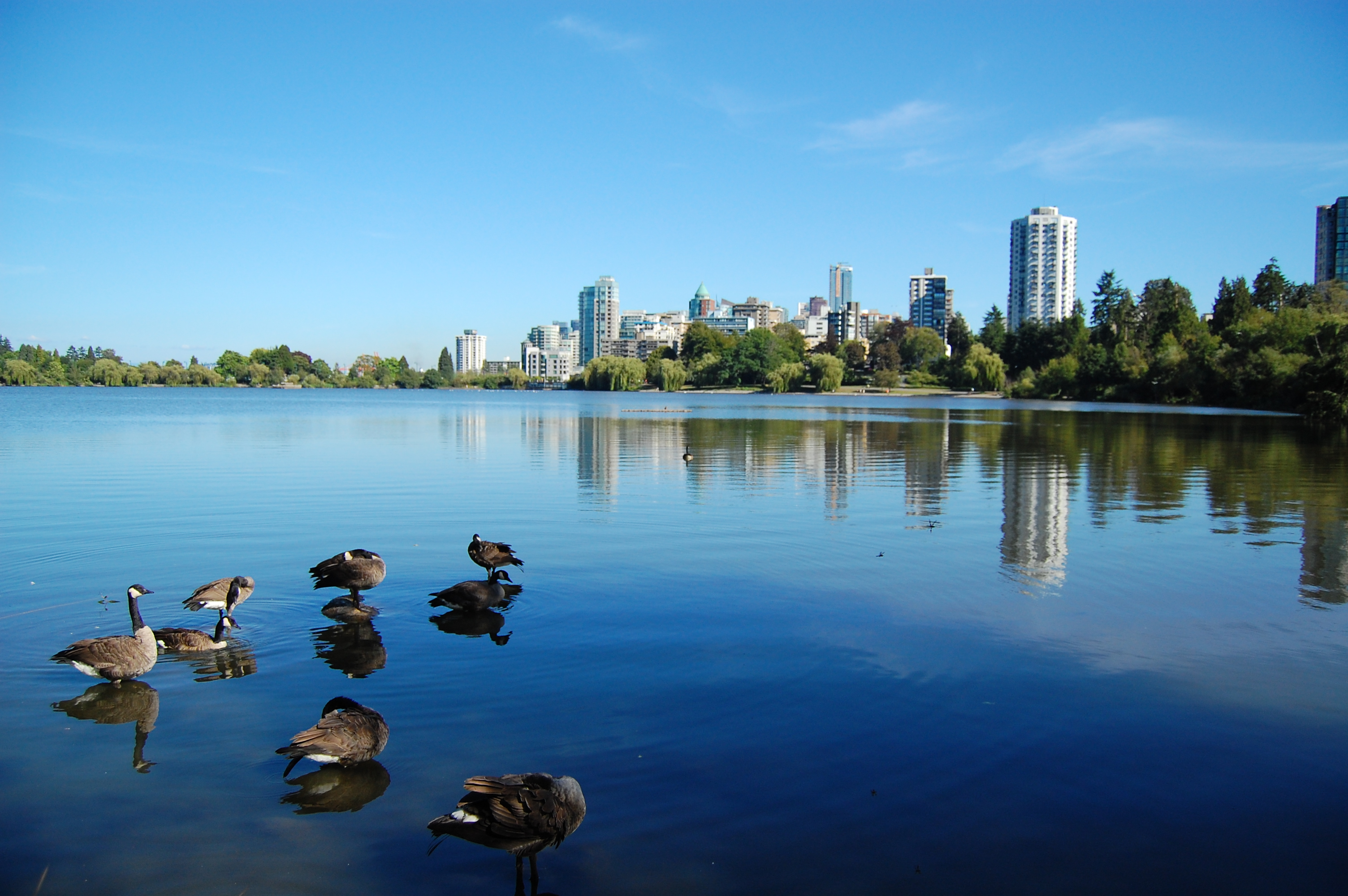
Lost Lagoon with Downtown Vancouver in the background.

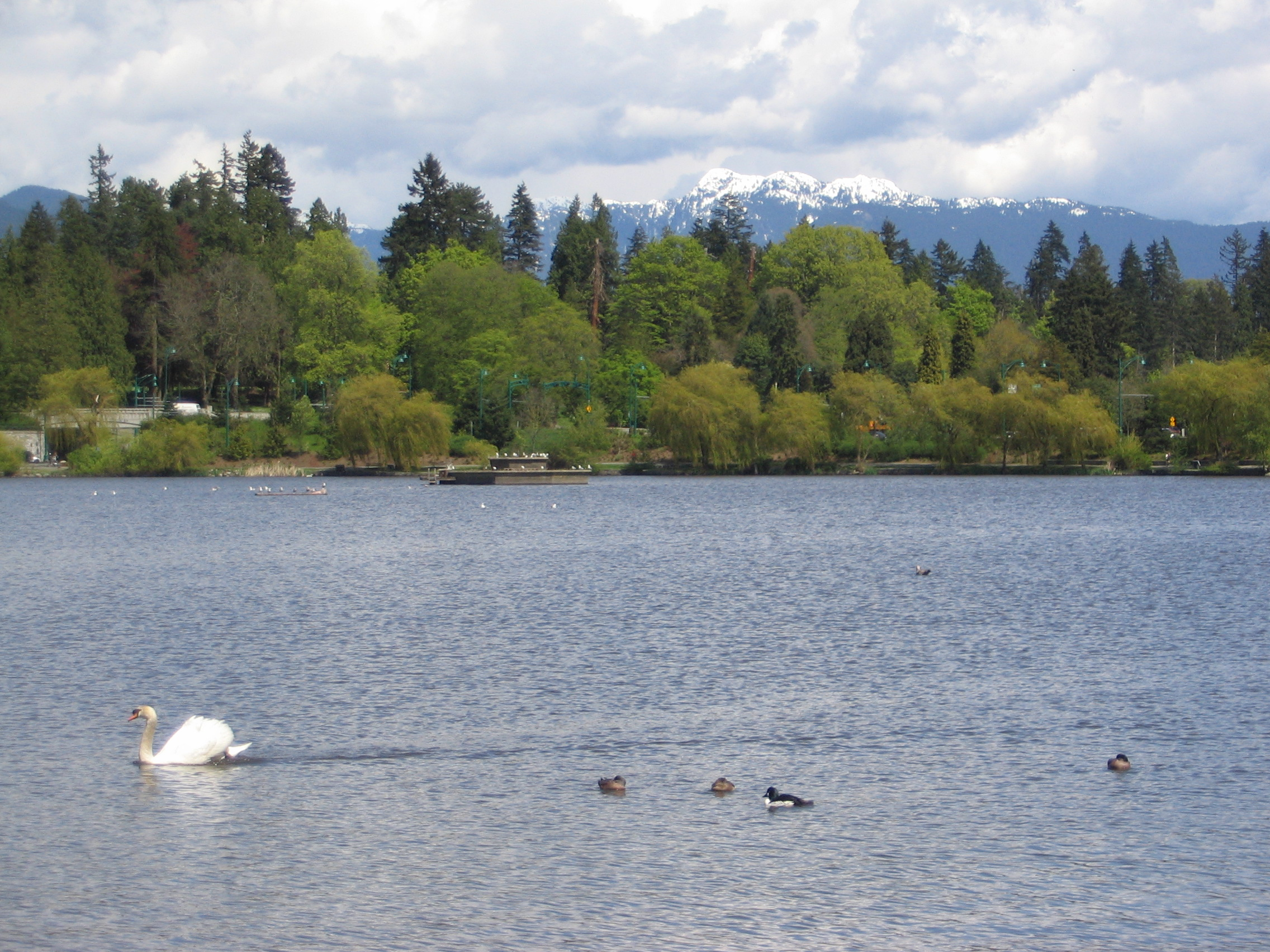
A view of Lost Lagoon looking North, with a swan in the foreground.

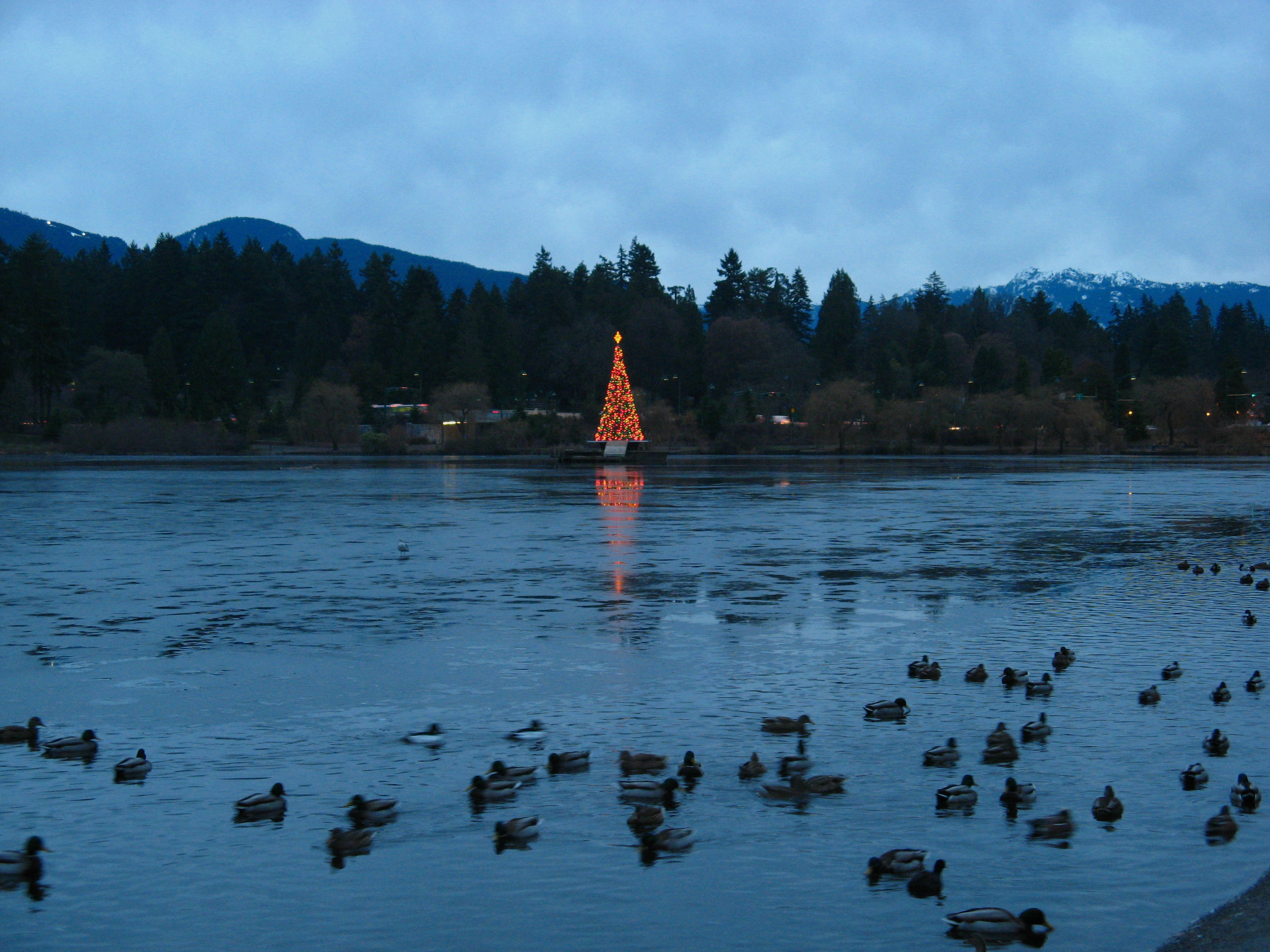
Lost Lagoon, showing Jubilee Fountain decorated for Christmas in December 2006.

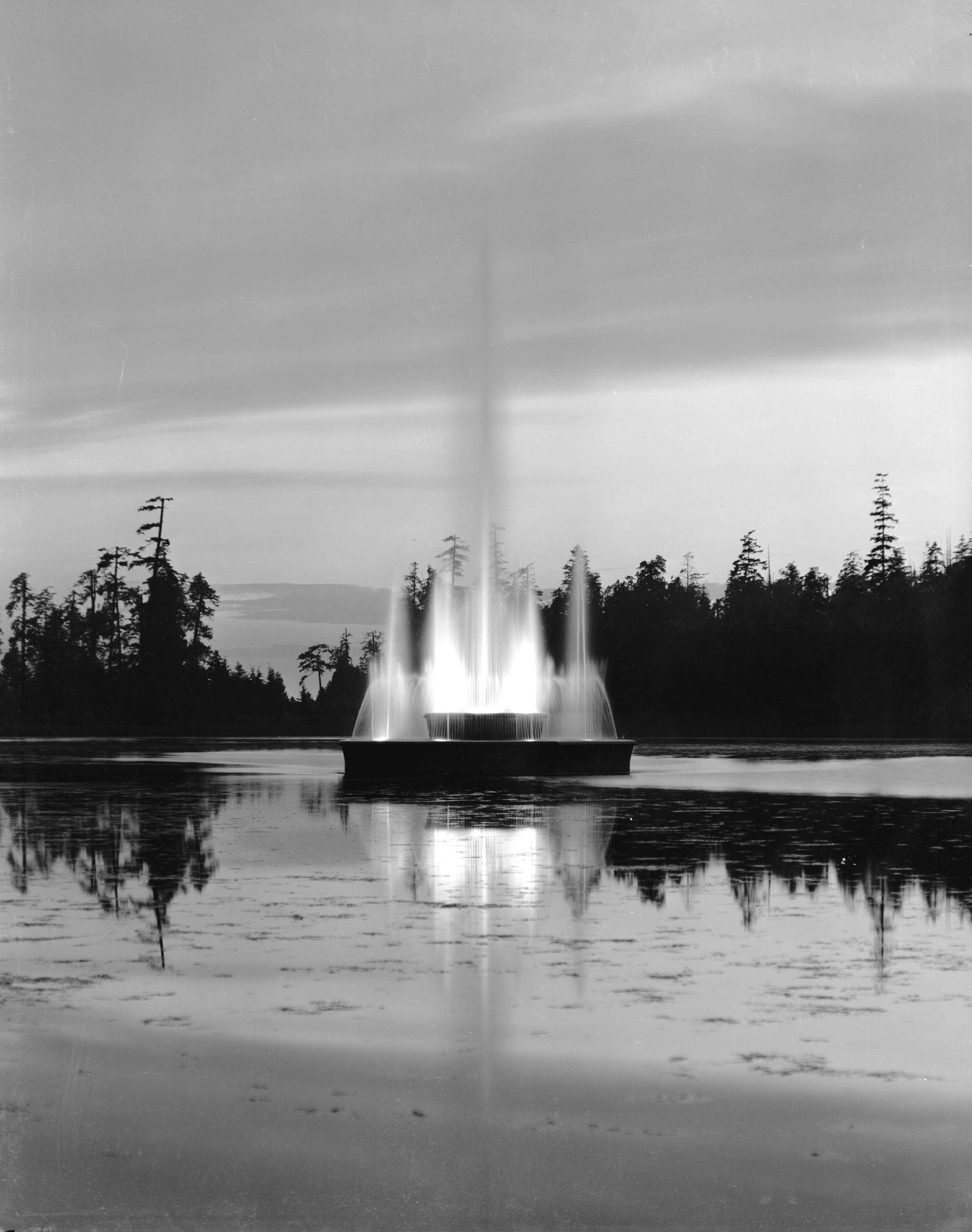
Jubilee Fountain in 1936. It was later restored for the Expo 86 world's fair and again in 2010.

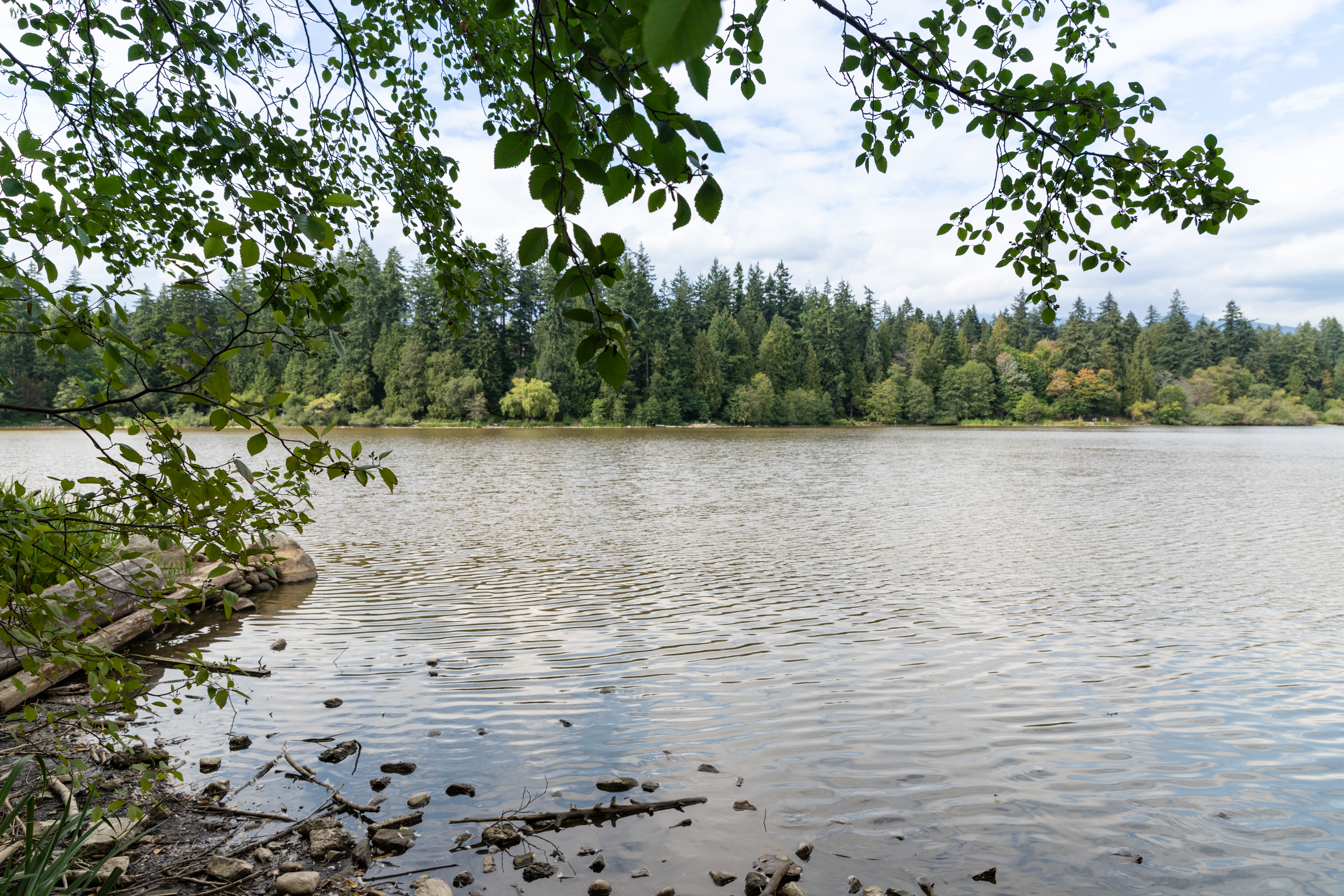
Lost Lagoon, Stanley Park Vancouver

Lost Lagoon is an artificial 16.6-hectare (41 acre) body of water, west of Georgia Street, near the entrance to Stanley Park in Vancouver, British Columbia, Canada. Surrounding the lake is a 1.75 km (1.09 mi) trail. The lake features a lit fountain that was erected by Robert Harold Williams to commemorate the city's golden jubilee. It is a nesting ground to many species of birds, including Canada geese, numerous species of duck such as mallard ducks, and great blue herons. Also many turtles are usually resident on the northern shore.

== Naming ==
The name for Lost Lagoon comes from a poem written by Pauline Johnson, who later explained her inspiration:

I have always resented that jarring unattractive name [Coal Harbour] for years. When I first plied paddle across the gunwale of a light canoe and idled about the margin, I named the sheltered little cove Lost Lagoon. This was just to please my own fancy for, as that perfect summer month drifted on, the ever restless tides left the harbor devoid of any water at my favorite conoeing hour and my pet idling place was lost for many days; hence my fancy to call it Lost Lagoon.

The lake was officially named Lost Lagoon in 1922 by the park board, long after Johnson's death and, ironically, after the lagoon had been permanently lost after becoming landlocked.

== History ==
Before the lake was created, it was a tidal mudflat. The Squamish name is Ch'ekxwa'7lech, which means "gets dry at times", referring to how tides would roll in and out from the mudflats. Before industrialization, the incoming high tide water from what would become Coal Harbour would flow onto the tidal flat and fill-up the lagoon, almost reaching to what would become English Bay. Then, at low tide, the ocean water would slip away.

During low tide, the mudflats were a source of clams, and a midden on the north side indicates that a large dwelling once stood there. Prior to the construction of the causeway, settlers also built cabins around the lake, which were all removed between 1913 and 1916 during construction.

In the 1950s, non-native mute swans, whose wing tendons were clipped to prevent escape and the introduction of a non-native species into the environment, were introduced to Lost Lagoon. As a non-native animal, they fell under special management regulations; they had to have their wings pinioned to prevent flight. Although beautiful to watch, these flightless swans were effectively sitting ducks. Throughout the years, they fell victim to otters, coyotes, and off-leash dogs. This practice was eventually discontinued, and the last three remaining swans were moved to an animal sanctuary in 2016.

== Development ==
When a causeway was first proposed in 1909, an intense public debate took place over the fate of the basin. As with most of the early controversies concerning the use of Stanley Park, organized labour was pitted against the more upper and middle class proponents of the City Beautiful movement. Trade union representatives argued that the majority working class population was in need of recreational facilities, while their opponents maintained that more aesthetic or ethereal considerations should take precedence in park development. The Vancouver Trades and Labour Council was adamantly opposed to the idea of an artificial lake, and argued for it to instead be filled in for use as a sports field. The park board retained the services of T. Mawson and Associates, an architectural landscaping firm that had designed the park's zoo and many other facilities in Stanley Park. The proposal the board settled on featured an artificial lake with a sports stadium on the northwest side and a large museum on the southwest shore. The $800,000 price tag, however, proved too steep for the board's budget, and the non-lake parts of the proposal were quashed.

The next phase in the lake's development came in 1929, when the saltwater pipes entering from Coal Harbour were shut off, turning it into a freshwater lake. The BC Fish and Game Protection Association was given permission to stock the lake with trout. The Stanley Park Flyfishing Association was formed, and charged members to fish in the lake, while the park board profited from the canoe and boat rentals. This came to an end in 1938 when the walkway around the lake was constructed and the area declared a bird sanctuary. Civic budgets were significantly reduced during the depression, but the park board benefited from the free labour of relief recipients, who were used to landscape Lost Lagoon.

The next controversy surrounding the lake followed the proposal for a fountain to be erected in the lake to coincide with the city's Golden Jubilee anniversary celebrations in 1936. For the mayor, it would be "a miracle of engineering," with the spray of water lit by virtually "limitless combinations" of colour. The public, in contrast, were not impressed by the proposal. Its $33,019.96 price tag was considered extremely frivolous in the midst of an economic crisis. As written in The Sunday Sun Edition of the Vancouver Sun Newspaper, Saturday, August 8. 1936. The lead story in the Magazine section is; SECRETS OF THE FOUNTAIN. It was the conception and idea of then, Chief Electrical Engineer, Robert Harold Williams with Hume and Rumble Ltd. electrical contractors. R.Harold Williams designed and supervised the erection of the Vancouver's Golden Jubilee fountain. After a business trip to Los Angeles he saw a fountain and thought this would be a great gift for the city for their up and coming birthday, Golden Jubilee celebration. To build the fountain, Lost Lagoon was drained. Seventy piles were driven into the mud. On these a concrete mat was laid. The fountain was built upon this mat. The work was of necessity rushed; it was done in a month. "The fountain is worthy of all the traditions of art, worthy of Vancouver's Golden Jubilee, and it will be a permanent, decorative joy in Stanley Park". "When operating, it is like a symphony concert, in motion and color instead of music, says Harold Williams, engineer, of Hume & Rumble Ltd., under whose personal supervision the work has been done." Vancouver's Jubilee Committee and private citizens who contributed are to be commended on their work in pushing for this beautiful fountain, which is sure to be one of the major attractions during the Golden Jubilee celebration. "We've had to hurry," says Mr. Williams," in that time 285 tons of cement have been utilized and all the special equipment was built." All equipment was built in Canada and the pumps were constructed in Vancouver. All union labor was employed. It was restored for Expo in 1986.

Lost Lagoon is a popular place for park users for strolling the perimeter trail and bird watching. On the southeast corner of the lake is the Lost Lagoon Nature House, an old boathouse that is now an interpretive centre for the Stanley Park Ecology Society. While rare in recent decades, Lost Lagoon can freeze during a cold spell, permitting public ice skating and ice hockey.

== See also ==
- Bodies of water in Vancouver
