= Aither =

Aither may refer to:

- Aether (classical element), the material supposed to fill the region of the universe above the terrestrial sphere
- Aether (mythology), the personification of the "upper sky", space and heaven, in Greek mythology

== See also ==
- Aether (disambiguation)
