= Aethyr =

Aethyr or æthyr may refer to:

- an archaic spelling of ether
- Aethyrs, in Enochian magic
- Aethyr, a fictional character in the Phantom Zone of DC Comics
- Aethyr, a fictional character in Smallville (season 5)
- Aethyr, a fifth element in the Cthulhu Mythos
- Aethyr, a disciple of General Zod in DC comics
- The Aethyr, in the Warhammer Fantasy universe

== See also ==
- Aether (disambiguation)
