= Ethereal =

Ethereal may refer to:

- Ethereal (horse), a horse that won Australia's Caulfield Cup as well as Melbourne Cup in 2001
- Ethereal (musician), American rapper and record producer
- Ethereal wave, or simply ethereal, a subgenre of dark wave music
- Wireshark, formerly named Ethereal, a free and open-source packet analyzer
- Ethereal, a 2022 album by Snot
- Ethereality, a 2018 album by Winter
- Ethereal, one of the antagonists from the video game Zenless Zone Zero.
- Ethereals, a class containing 31 monsters (common forms) from My Singing Monsters.

== See also ==
- Aether (disambiguation)
