= MOSART =

Atmospheric radiative transfer algorithm

MOSART (Moderate Spectral Atmospheric Radiance and Transmittance) was an atmospheric radiative transfer algorithm developed by the US Department of Defense. Development has halted as funding for the project has ended. In order to continue development, Computational Physics, Inc. (CPI) has created AETHER (or Atmospheric Effects on Transfer of Heat and Environmental Radiation), built from MOSART.
