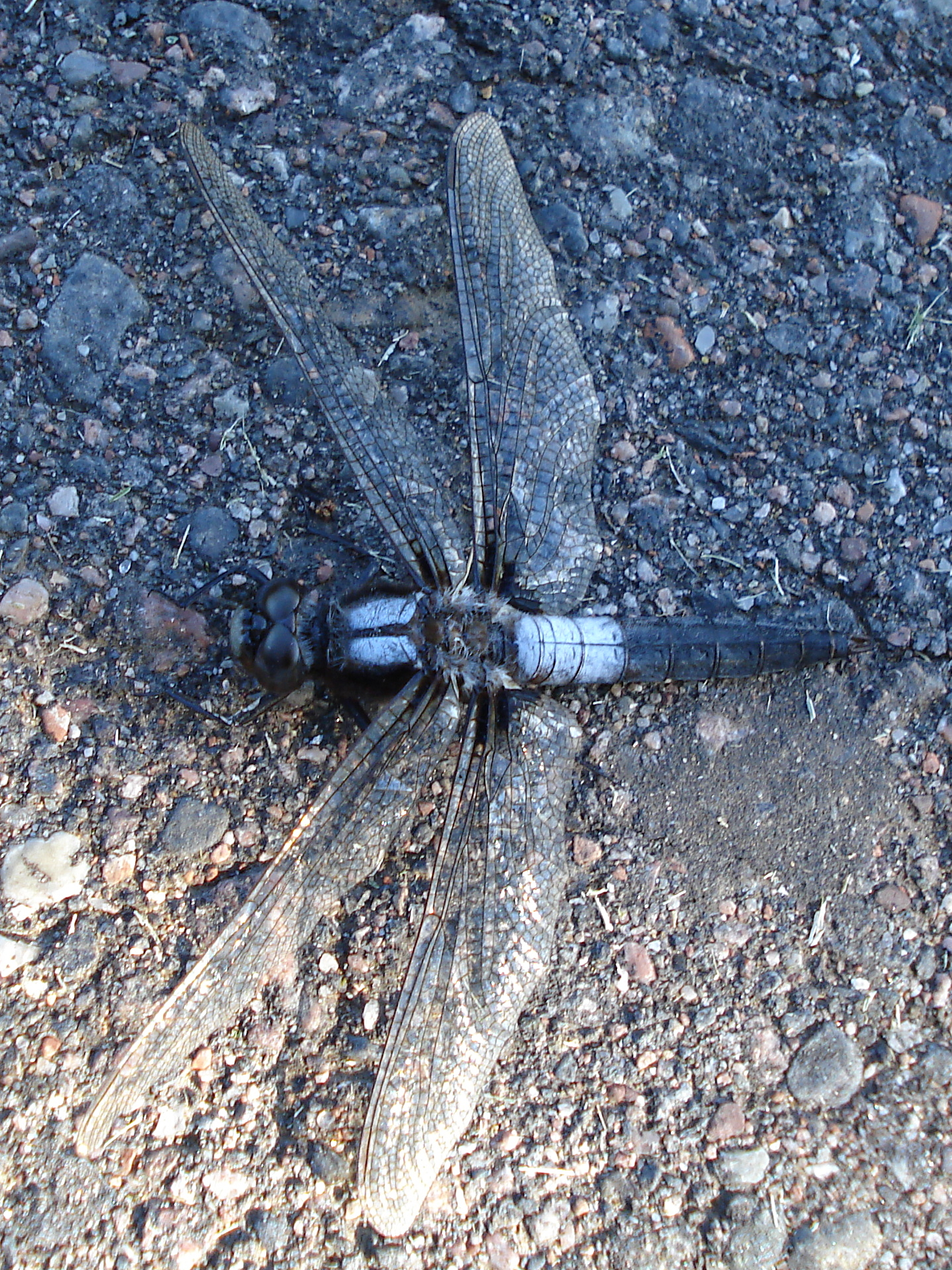
- Male

Conservation status
- Secure (NatureServe)

Scientific classification
- Kingdom: Animalia
- Phylum: Arthropoda
- Class: Insecta
- Order: Odonata
- Infraorder: Anisoptera
- Family: Libellulidae
- Genus: Ladona
- Species: L. julia

Binomial name
- Ladona julia Uhler, 1857

= Chalk-fronted corporal =

Species of dragonfly

The chalk-fronted corporal (Ladona julia) is a skimmer dragonfly found in the northern United States and southern Canada.

Juveniles of both sexes are light reddish brown, with white shoulder stripes and a black stripe down the middle of the abdomen. As they mature, males develop a white pruinescence on the top of the thorax and at the base of the abdomen, while the rest of the abdomen turns black. Females become almost uniformly dark brown, with a dusting of gray pruinescence near the base of the abdomen; a few develop the same color pattern as the males.

Chalk-fronted corporals often perch horizontally on the ground or on floating objects in the water, flying up to take prey from the air. They are gregarious for dragonflies, and are commonly seen perching in groups. They readily approach humans to feed on the mosquitoes and biting flies that humans attract.

== Gallery ==
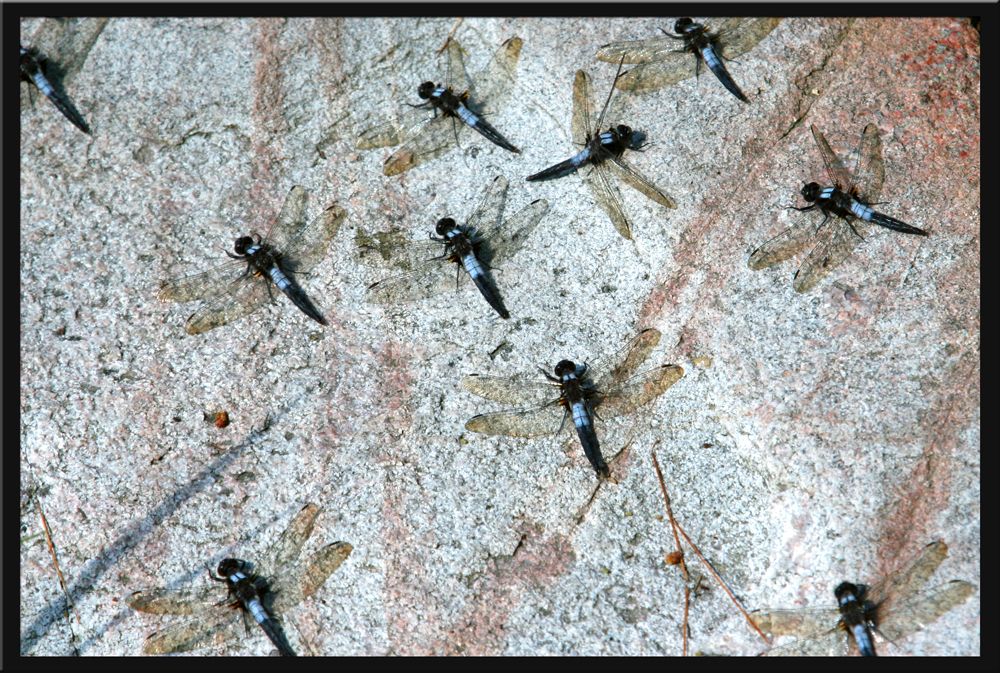
Males

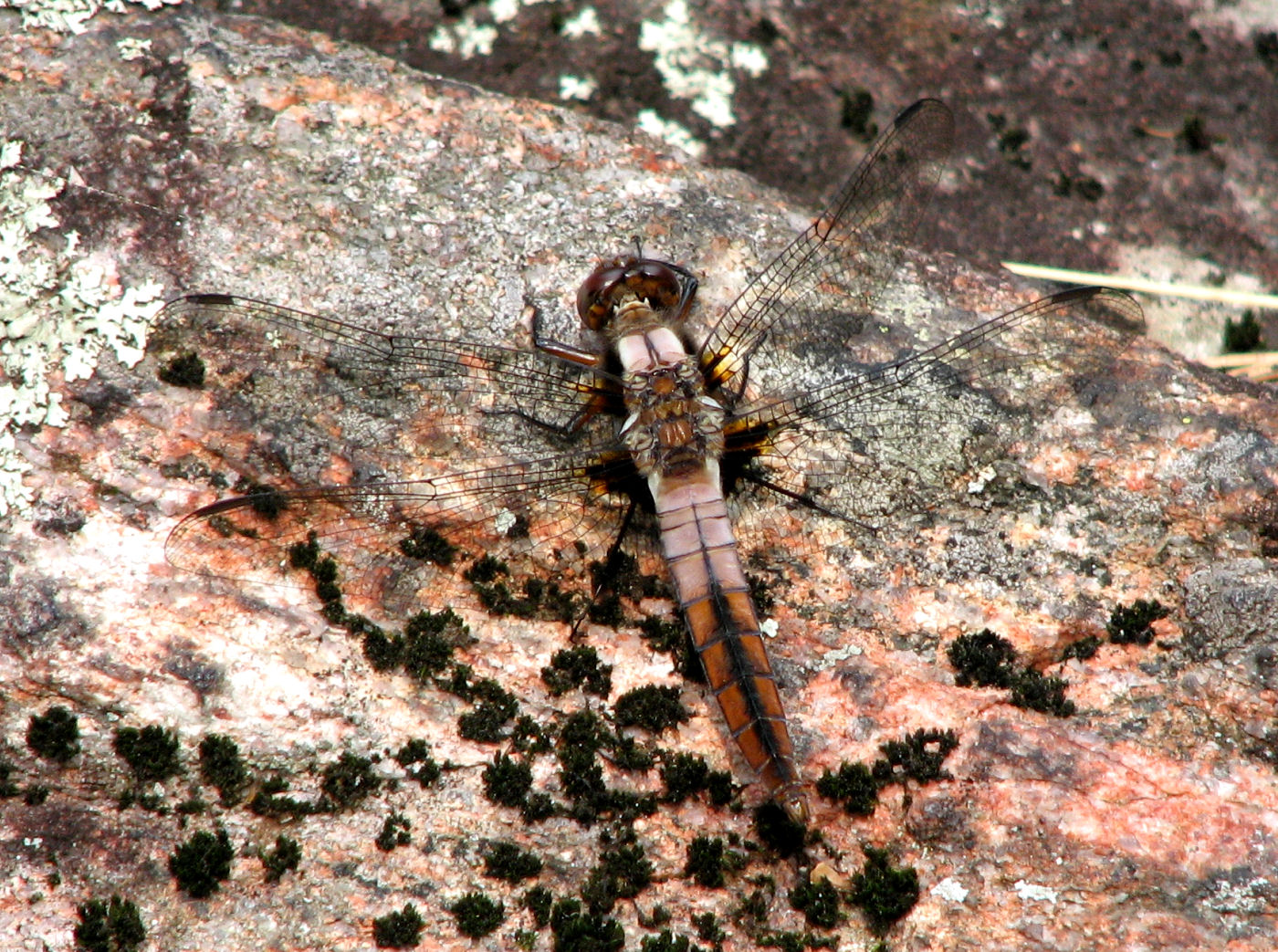
Female juvenile

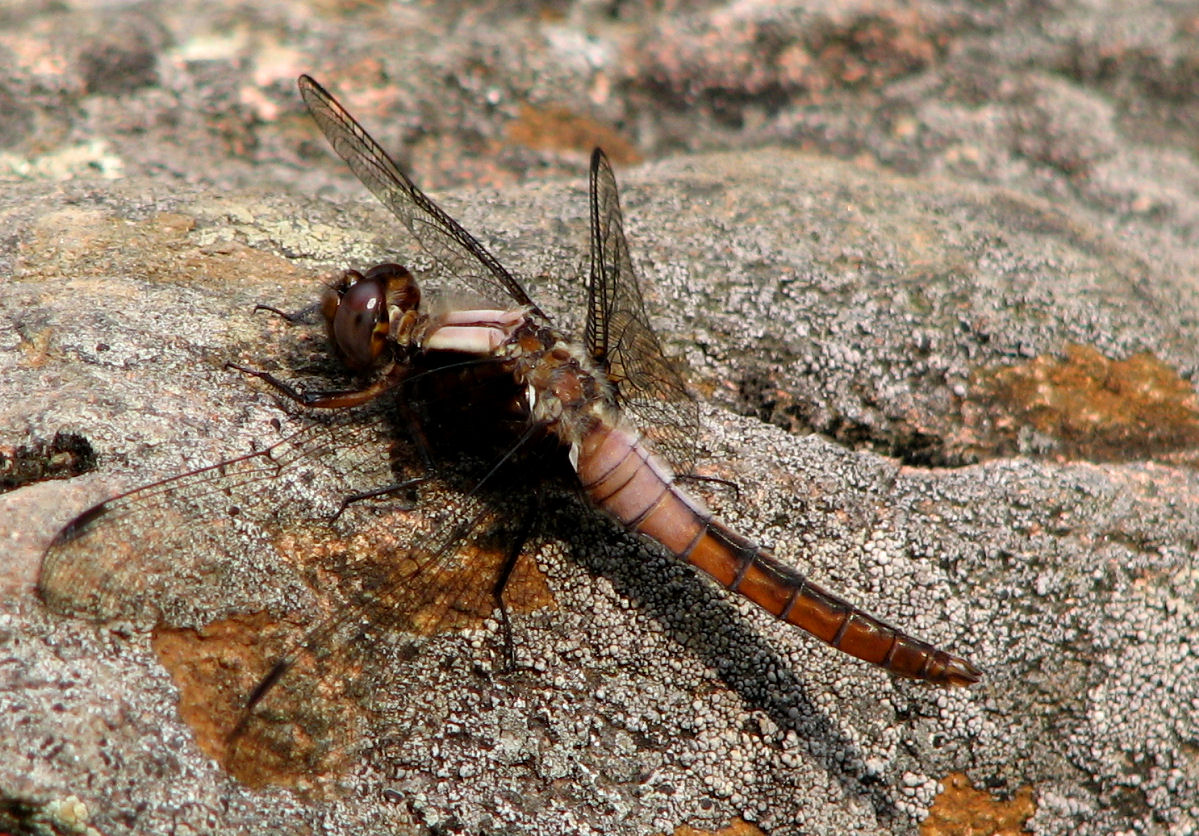
Female juvenile

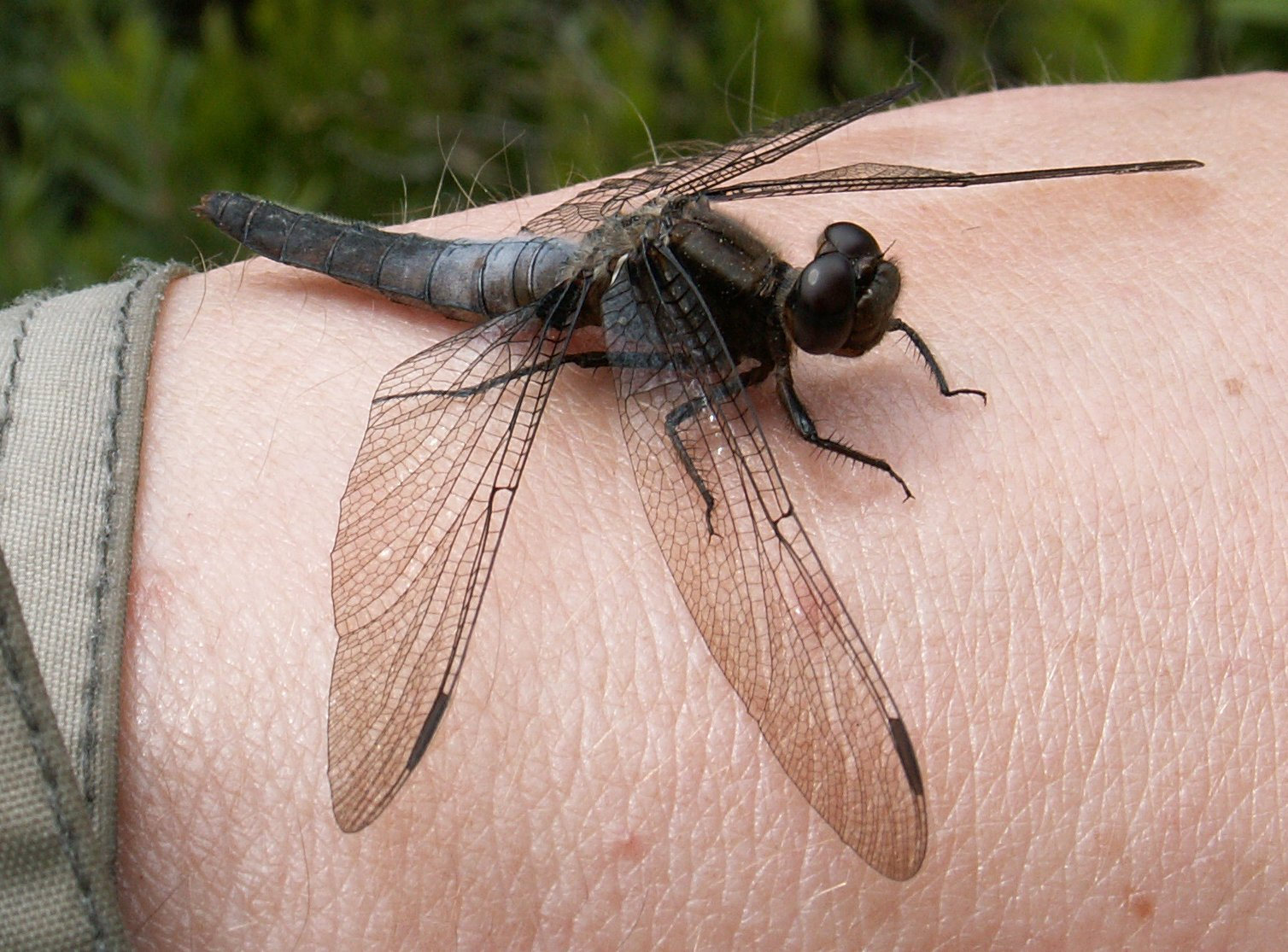
Female

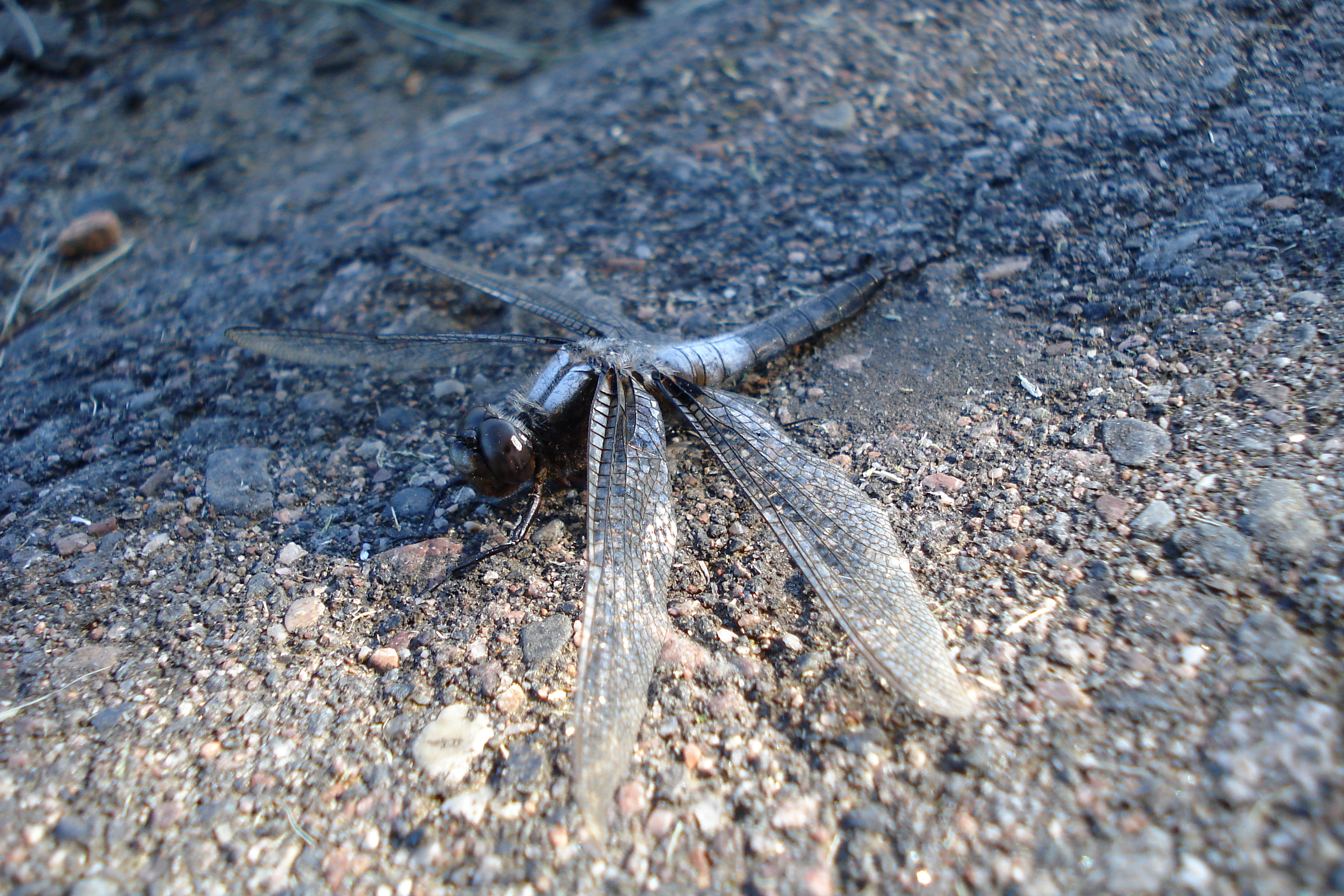
Male
