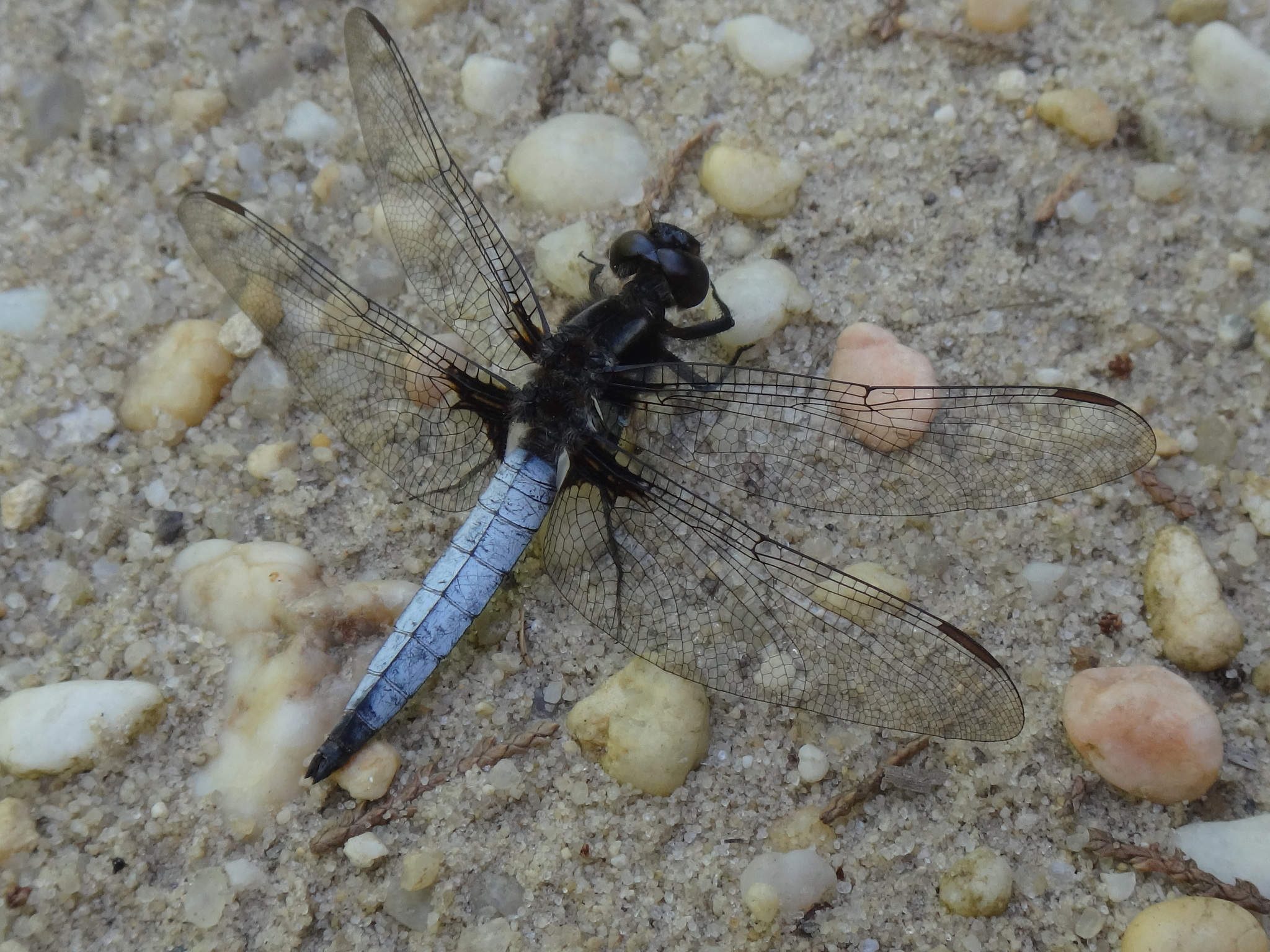

Conservation status
- Least Concern (IUCN 3.1)

Scientific classification
- Kingdom: Animalia
- Phylum: Arthropoda
- Class: Insecta
- Order: Odonata
- Infraorder: Anisoptera
- Family: Libellulidae
- Genus: Ladona
- Species: L. exusta

Binomial name
- Ladona exusta (Say, 1839)

Synonyms
- Libellula exusta Say, 1839

= Ladona exusta =

Species of dragonfly

Ladona exusta, the white corporal, is a species of skimmer in the dragonfly family Libellulidae.

The IUCN conservation status of Ladona exusta is "LC", least concern, with no immediate threat to the species' survival. The population is stable. The IUCN status was reviewed in 2017.
