= Aether Industries =

Indian chemical company

Aether Industries Limited
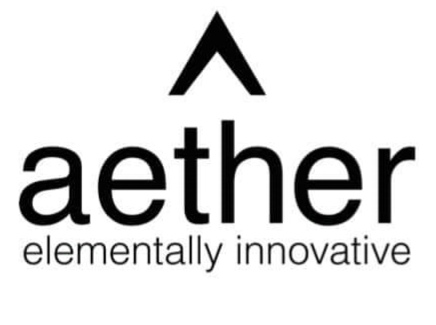
- Company type: Public
- Traded as: BSE: 543534; NSE: AETHER
- ISIN: INE0BWX01014)
- Industry: Conglomerate
- Founded: 2013; 13 years ago
- Founder: Ashwin Desai
- Headquarters: Surat, Gujarat, India
- Area served: Worldwide
- Key people: Ashwin Desai (Founder and Managing Director ) Purnima Desai (Co-Founder ) Rohan Desai (Co-Founder ) Dr. Aman Desai (Co-Founder and Director )
- Products: Pharmaceutical; Agrochemical; Material science; Coating; Oil refining; Food additives; High performance photography; Media; Oil and gas segments
- Owner: Ashwin Desai
- Number of employees: 1000+

Aether Industries Limited is an Indian chemical manufacturing company based in Surat, Gujarat. The company specializes in producing advanced intermediates and specialty chemicals for various industries, including pharmaceuticals, agrochemicals, material sciences, and oil and gas.

== History ==
Aether Industries Limited was established in 2013, initially focused on developing chemical processes. Revenue operations began in Fiscal Year 2018.

In June 2022, Aether Industries went public with its Initial Public Offering (IPO) on Indian stock exchange. Following its public debut, the company also conducted a Qualified Institutional Placement (QIP) in June 2023 to raise additional capital.

== Business operations ==
Aether Industries produces specialty chemicals and intermediates.

In 2023, Aether Industries entered into a Contract/Exclusive Manufacturing Agreement with Chemoxy International Limited, a wholly owned subsidiary of the SEQENS group.

== Employees ==
As of 31 March 2024, Aether Industries' average employee age is 29 years.
