= Ladona =

Scientific classification
- Kingdom: Animalia
- Phylum: Arthropoda
- Class: Insecta
- Order: Odonata
- Infraorder: Anisoptera
- Family: Libellulidae
- Subfamily: Libellulinae
- Genus: Ladona; Needham, 1897

Species
- Ladona deplanata (Rambur, 1842); Ladona julia (Uhler, 1857); Ladona exusta (Say, 1840)

Genus of insects

Ladona is a genus of dragonflies in the family Libellulidae. It contains three species.

== Species ==
Ladona contains the following species:

| Male | Female | Scientific name | Common name | Distribution |
|---|---|---|---|---|
| | | Ladona deplanata (Rambur, 1842) | blue corporal | eastern United States |
| | | Ladona exusta (Say, 1839) | white corporal | Mid-Atlantic and New England |
| | | Ladona julia (Uhler, 1857) | chalk-fronted corporal | northern United States and southern Canada |
