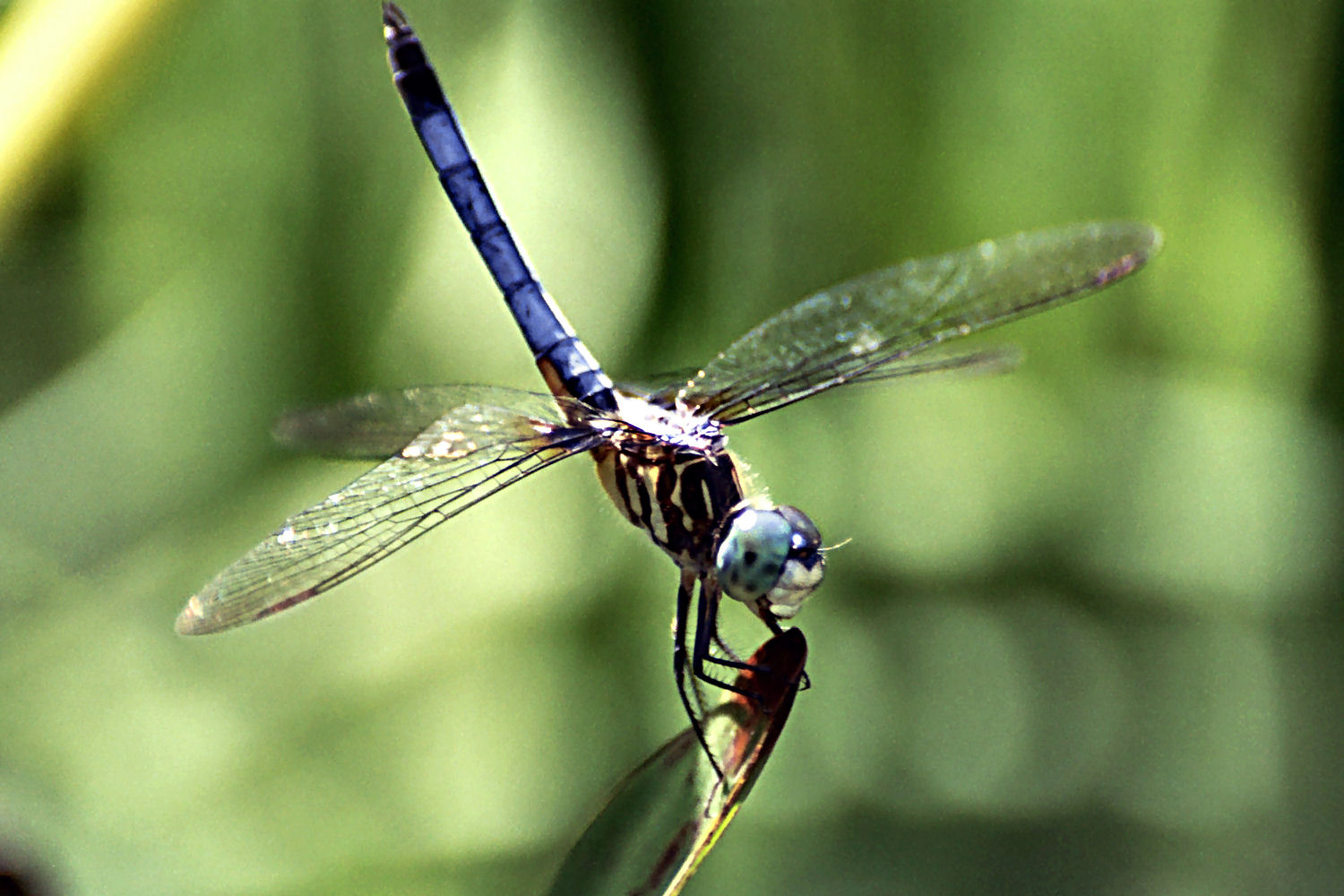
- Male with raised abdomen that may be a threat display or a response to heat (the obelisk posture)
- Female

Conservation status
- Least Concern (IUCN 3.1)

Scientific classification
- Kingdom: Animalia
- Phylum: Arthropoda
- Clade: Pancrustacea
- Class: Insecta
- Order: Odonata
- Infraorder: Anisoptera
- Superfamily: Libelluloidea
- Family: Libellulidae
- Genus: Pachydiplax; Brauer, 1868
- Species: P. longipennis

Binomial name
- Pachydiplax longipennis (Burmeister, 1839)

= Blue dasher =

Species of dragonfly

The blue dasher (Pachydiplax longipennis) is an insect of the skimmer family. It is the only species in the genus Pachydiplax. It is widely distributed throughout North America and into the Bahamas.

Although the species name longipennis means "long wings", their wings are not substantially longer than those of related species. Females do, however, have a short abdomen that makes the wings appear longer in comparison. The blue dasher grows up to 25–43 millimeters (1.0–1.7 in) long.

The males are easy to recognize with their vibrant blue color, yellow-striped thorax, and metallic green eyes. Females are somewhat less colorful than the male, an example of sexual dimorphism. While they have a matching yellow-striped thorax, their abdomen has a distinct brown and yellow striping that sets them apart from the male, along with contrasting red eyes. Both sexes develop a frosted color with age.

Pachydiplax longipennis exhibits aggression while finding mates and foraging, and they are not under any conservation threats.

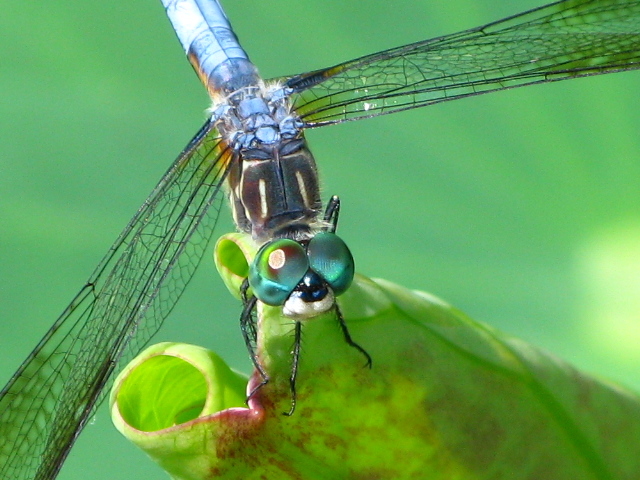
Male on a lotus leaf

Ovipositing Naperville USA

== Distribution and habitat ==
Pachydiplax longipennis is a commonly spotted dragonfly species in the United States, and this species is found in many types of habitats. These habitats generally consist of some kind of body of water, like a stream, river, or lake. This species has now been spotted in lower portions of Canada (Ottawa), and it is suggested that climate change is allowing for a broadening of this species' distribution.

== Dispersal ==
Dispersal of this species is linked to territorial behavior. Males of this species exhibit extreme territorial behavior, often leading to repercussions for smaller males. Smaller males tend to be driven away from breeding grounds by larger males, resulting in these smaller males dispersing to other areas. Researchers believe that this method of dispersal could be important in further studies of population genetics and gene flow of this species. Wing coloration also varies with the range of this species, indicating that dispersal location and wing coloration are connected. Populations of P. longipennis occurring in more hot regions tend to lack the darker wing coloration present in populations in cooler regions. This darker wing coloration can help with thermoregulation, flight performance, and territory securement. Thus, temperature has a large effect on the evolution of this species' wing coloration across its dispersal range.

== Habitat ==
Blue dashers live near still, calm bodies of water, such as ponds, marshes, slow-moving waterways, and ditches, in warm areas typically at low elevations. The adults roost in trees at night.

== Diet and feeding ==
These dragonflies, like others of their infraorder, are carnivorous, and are capable of eating hundreds of insects every day, including mosquito and mayfly larvae. The adult dragonfly will eat nearly any flying insect, such as a moth or fly. Nymphs have a diet that includes other aquatic larvae, small fish, and tadpoles. These dragonflies are known to be voracious predators, consuming up to 10% of their body weight each day in food.

The blue dasher hunts by keeping still and waiting for suitable prey to come within range. When it does, they dart from their position to catch it.

The foraging behavior of this dragonfly is influenced by different factors, such as external temperature, prey availability, and perch position. P. longipennis tends to forage on small prey, which differs from the unselective foraging behavior of other Odonata species. This species also moves to different foraging sites frequently, meaning they do not stay put in one place too long searching for food. P. longipennis also exhibits aggressive behavior when foraging for food. Both males and females take part in this aggression when looking for prey. P. longipennis will engage in this behavior towards individuals of the same species and individuals of other species, but males tend to fight (and win) more often than females. Researchers suggest that the more successful an individual is using aggression, then the more likely they will gain a better perch and thus increase their chance to find prey.

== Life history ==
Pachydiplax longipennis larvae exhibit asynchronous emergence, meaning that the larvae do not emerge at the same time as one another. Based on general time of emergence, this species is still classified as a summer species. The larvae of this species often vary greatly in regard to size due to generational overlap of groups. This generational overlap is created by some groups producing one brood and other groups producing two broods in a breeding season. The timing of P. longipennis larvae emergence has also been linked to the presence of its predator, Anax junius. Research has shown that if larvae are in their peak physical state, then they have a higher likelihood of emerging in the presence of their predator, as opposed to weaker larvae likely emerging in the absence of the predator. Cannibalism also poses a threat, and the stronger larvae emerge earlier when this threat is high.

== Conservation and global warming ==
This species is at a low vulnerability in regard to conservation. However, P. longipennis and all other dragonflies are indicators of a healthy ecosystem. As wetlands and other various habitats for dragonflies decrease due to habitat destruction, so do the populations of dragonflies. Therefore, dragonflies are at the forefront of conservation movements.

In regard to global warming, studies have shown that increasing temperature has an effect on larvae emergence time and survival. Larvae under the conditions predicted for 100 years in the future emerge significantly earlier, and their survival rate is much lower, indicating possible effects of global warming on this dragonfly.
