= List of attractions and monuments in Stanley Park =

This is a list of attractions and monuments in Stanley Park, located in Vancouver, British Columbia, Canada.

Stanley Park is one of the most popular attractions in the city for both tourists and local residents, drawing an estimated eight million visitors every year. The following is a list of its many statues, monuments, and attractions.

== Attractions ==
=== East side of the park ===
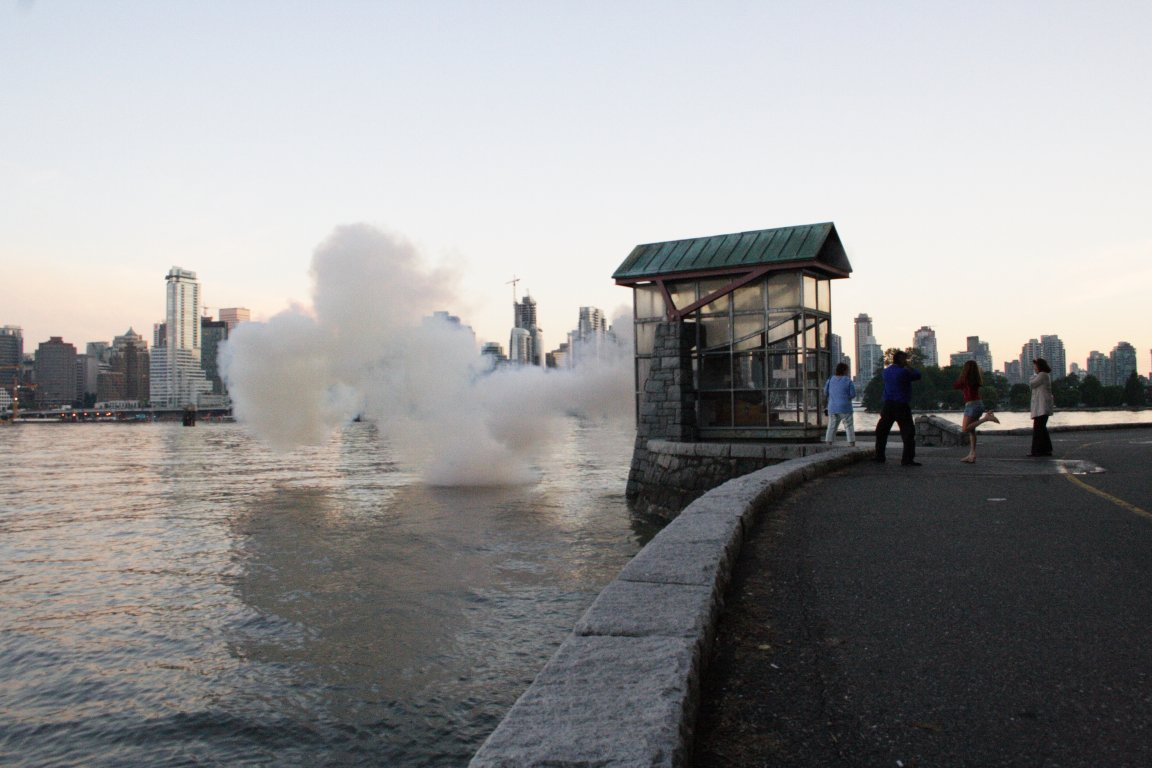
Nine O’Clock Gun firing.

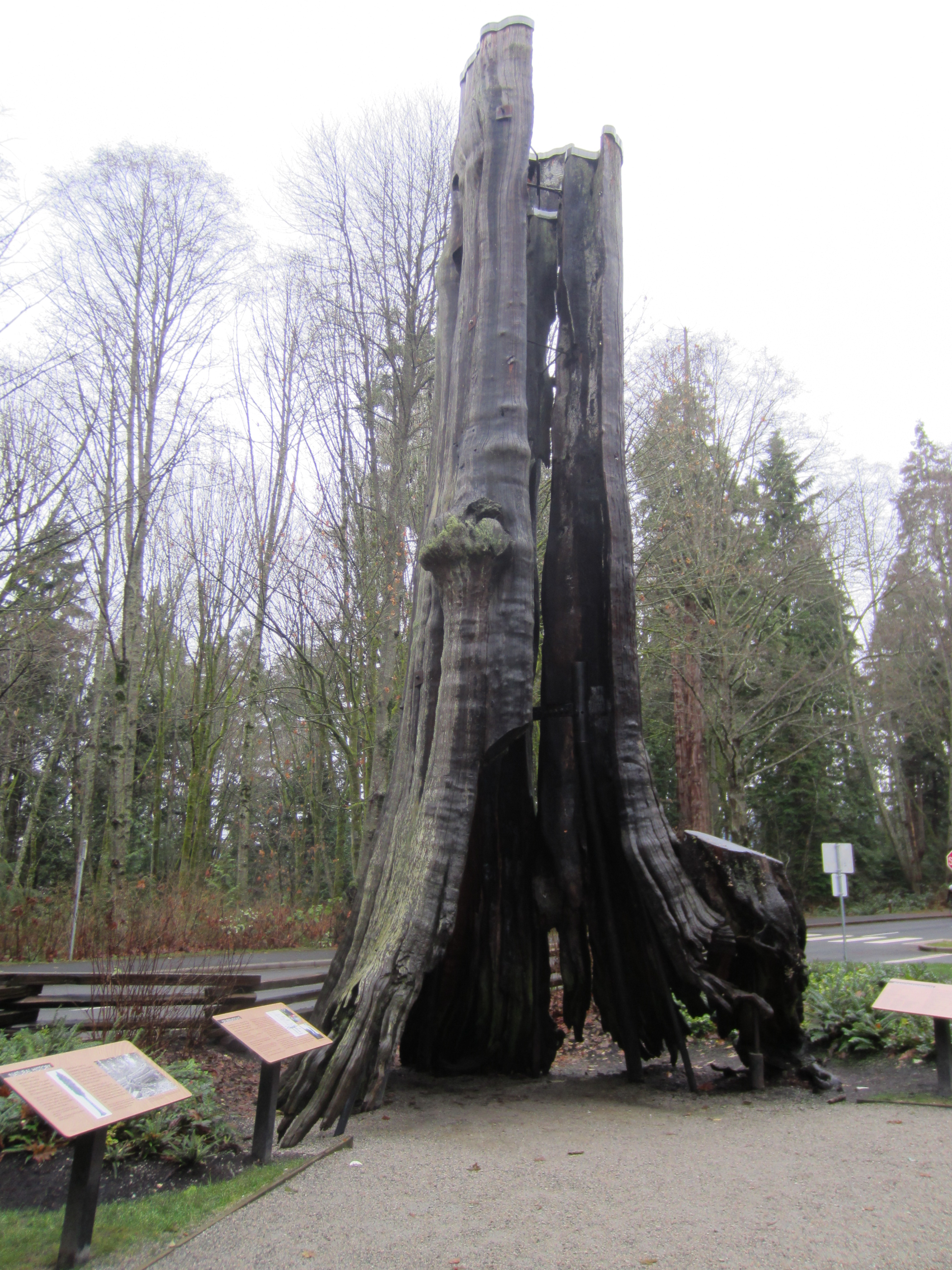
Hollow Tree, 2012

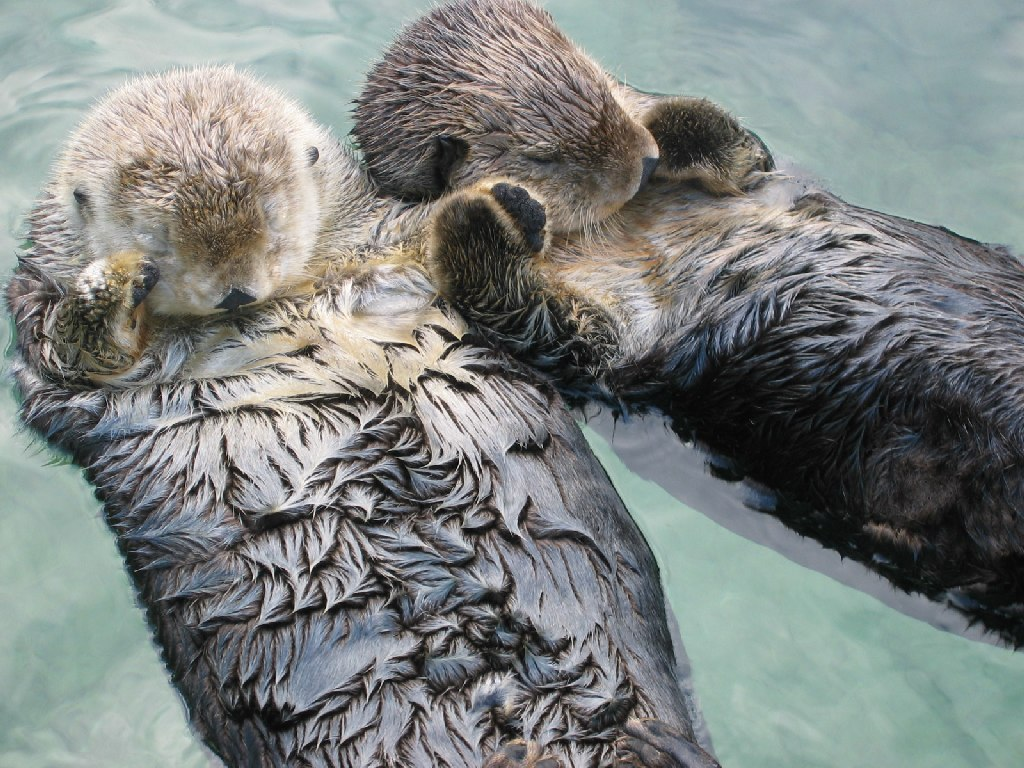
Sea otters at the Vancouver Aquarium

The following attractions are found east of the causeway:

- 9 O'Clock Gun – Fires every day at 21:00. Located by Brockton Point.
- Beaver Lake – Nestled in the forest northwest of Lumberman's Arch.
- Brockton Oval – Fields used for athletics (including an oval running track) since 1891.
- Brockton Oval Clubhouse – Also known as the Cricket & Rugby Pavilion. Built in 1927.
- Brockton Point and lighthouse – A lighthouse, designed by Thomas Hayton Mawson, was built in 1914 to replace one built in 1890.
- Deadman's Island – No public access but can be seen from land near Brockton Point.
- HMCS Discovery Building – No public access but can be seen from land near Brockton Point.
- Klahowya Village – Open in summer. Located behind the Stanley Park Pavilion.
- Lumberman's Arch – Children's play area, water spray park, and picnic area. Near the aquarium. (See note below at Miscellaneous.)
- Malkin Bowl – Former mayor W.H. Malkin built a "shell" stage modelled after the Hollywood Bowl in Los Angeles in honour of his late wife in 1934. On July 8, 1934, Malkin Bowl hosts its first concert, a free performance by the Vancouver Symphony that draws 15,000 people. It was rebuilt after a fire in 1982. Located in front of the Stanley Park Pavilion.
- Ridable miniature railway – A diminutive steam train that pulls passenger cars on a circuit through the woods first opened in the 1940s. A new train and track opened in 1964. Located behind the Stanley Park Pavilion.
- Rock Garden – Developed in 1911-1920 using stones excavated when the pavilion was built. Encircles part of the Stanley Park Pavilion.
- Rose Garden – Developed in 1920-21. Located south of the Stanley Park Pavilion.
- Rose Garden Cottage – Built around the same time.
- Stables – Located in the service yards of Stanley Park near the Rose Gardens at 605 Pipeline Road.
- Stanley Park Pavilion – Now home to Stanley's Park Bar & Grill. Built in 1911-12, designed by Otto Moberg. Architect Percy Underwood designed the addition, 1946–50, on the pavilion's west side. Close to the aquarium.
- Totem poles at Brockton Point – This is the most visited tourist attraction in British Columbia. Many of the original poles were moved to museums in order to preserve them. Several replicas were commissioned or loaned to the park board between 1986 and 1992. Located at Brockton Point.
- Vancouver Aquarium – The largest in Canada and one of the five largest in North America. Opened in 1956.
- Vancouver Rowing Club – Located by Coal Harbour entrance to the park. Built in 1911.

=== West side of the park ===
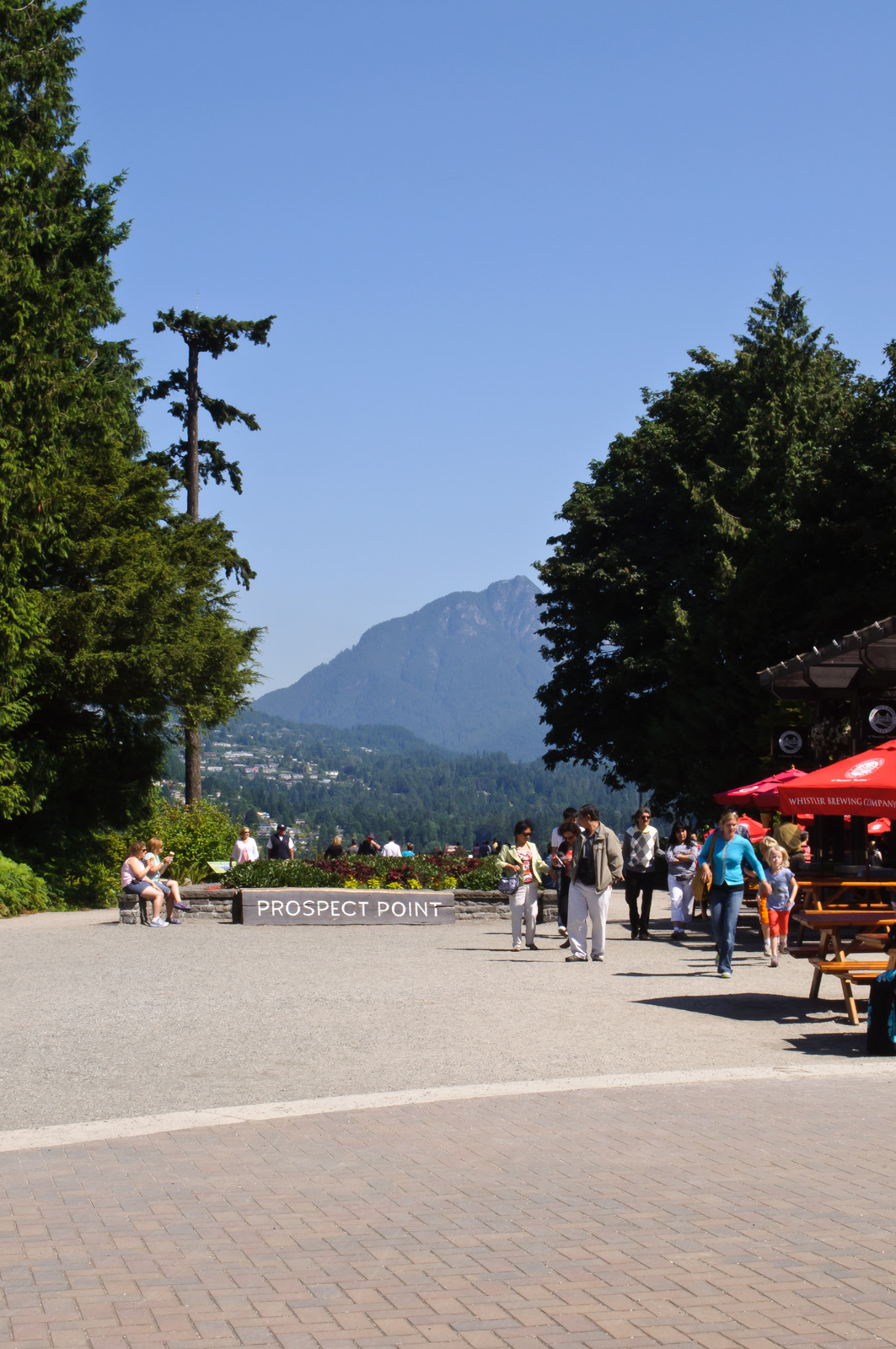
Prospect Point, a popular lookout at the park's highest point

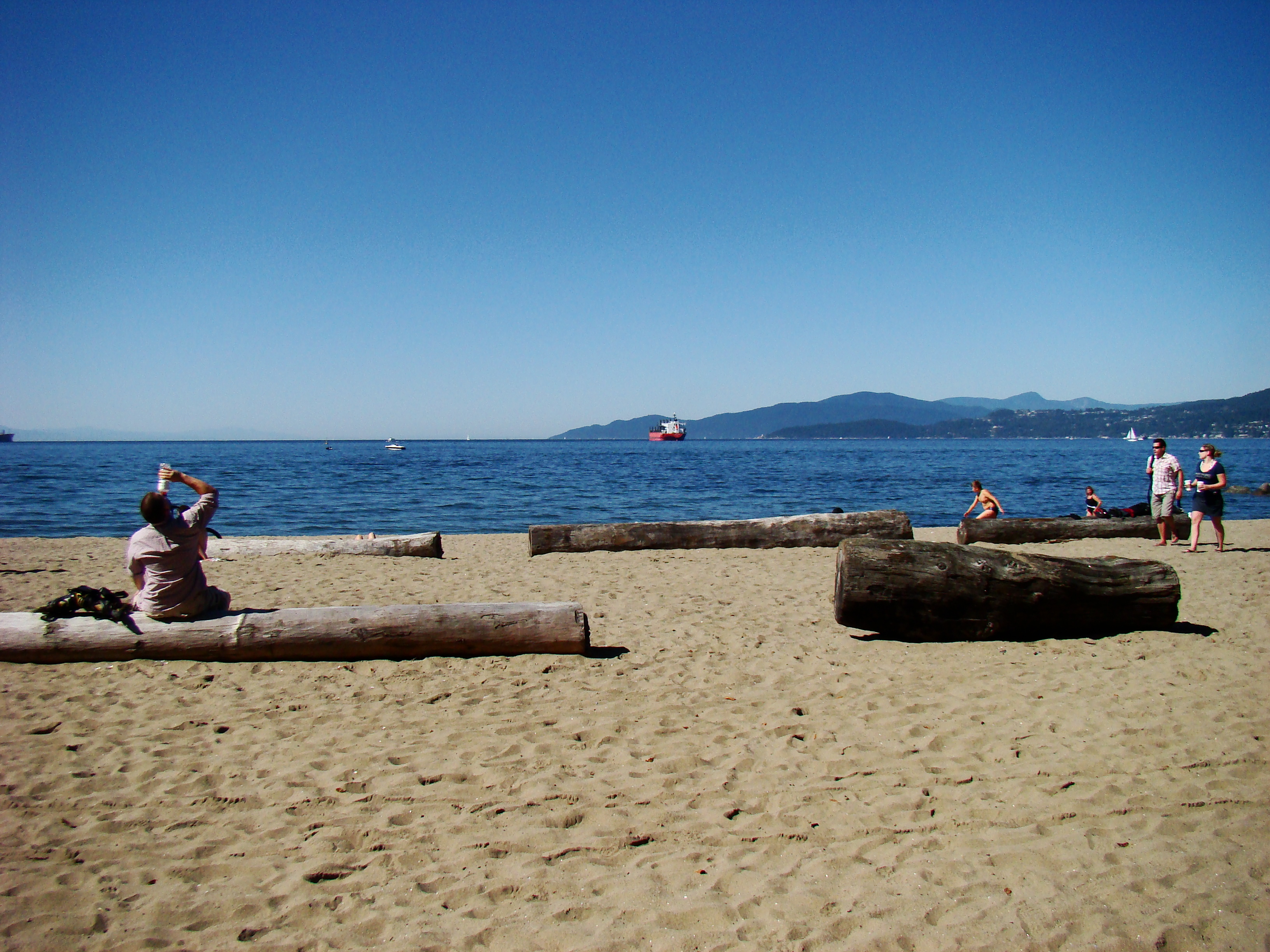
Third Beach, looking west over the Pacific Ocean

The following attractions are found west of the causeway, in an area that includes Lost Lagoon and Prospect Point.

- Ceperley Meadow – Children's play area and picnic area directly behind Second Beach.
- Ferguson Point – Lookout and picnic area. Located above Third Beach.
- Fish House restaurant – Located inland in a former sports pavilion (built in 1930) east of Second Beach.
- Hollow Tree – Located on the side of the road heading up to Prospect Point.
- Lost Lagoon and Jubilee Fountain – Lagoon designed by Thomas Hayton Mawson. The fountain was purchased to commemorate Vancouver's 50th anniversary in 1936.
- Lost Lagoon Nature House – Formerly a boathouse. Run by the Stanley Park Ecology Society, located on the south shore of Lost Lagoon.
- Park Board Administration building – Opened in 1962. Designed by architect Percy Underwood. Located at 2099 Beach Avenue, near the English Bay entrance to the park.
- Pitch and Putt Golf Course – Built in 1932. Architect Percy Underwood designed the Golf Course Ticket Booth, 1953-55. The par 3 course takes 1–3 hours to complete. Located inland east of Second Beach.
- Prospect Point – A lookout at the highest point in the park. Located by the Lions Gate Bridge.
- Second Beach and pool – Located on the south shore, past English Bay.
- Siwash Rock – Located by Third Beach.
- Siwash Rock lookout – Access from trails above.
- Teahouse restaurant – Located in former officer's mess (built in 1938) at Ferguson Point.
- Ted and Mary Greig Rhododendron Garden – While the shrubs were donated in 1965, the garden was not dedicated until 1989. The rhododendrons are planted in a roughly circular form around the pitch and putt golf course near Lost Lagoon. Best time of year to visit is March–May. The peak is usually early May.
- Tennis Courts – Located in two places: near the Beach Avenue entrance to Stanley Park and near Lost Lagoon along Lagoon Drive.
- Third Beach – On sunny Tuesdays, a drum circle frequently breaks out at sunset. Located on the southwest shore, past Second Beach.
- Two Spirits Sculpture – Slightly hidden, this sculpture is found just west of the crossroads of trails that enter into Stanley Park from the swimming pool located at Second Beach. The sculpture was created in the mid-1990s and depicts the silhouetted head of an aboriginal person against its own image. The sculpture was chiseled into a stump that remains from one the large trees in the area.

== Statues and monuments ==
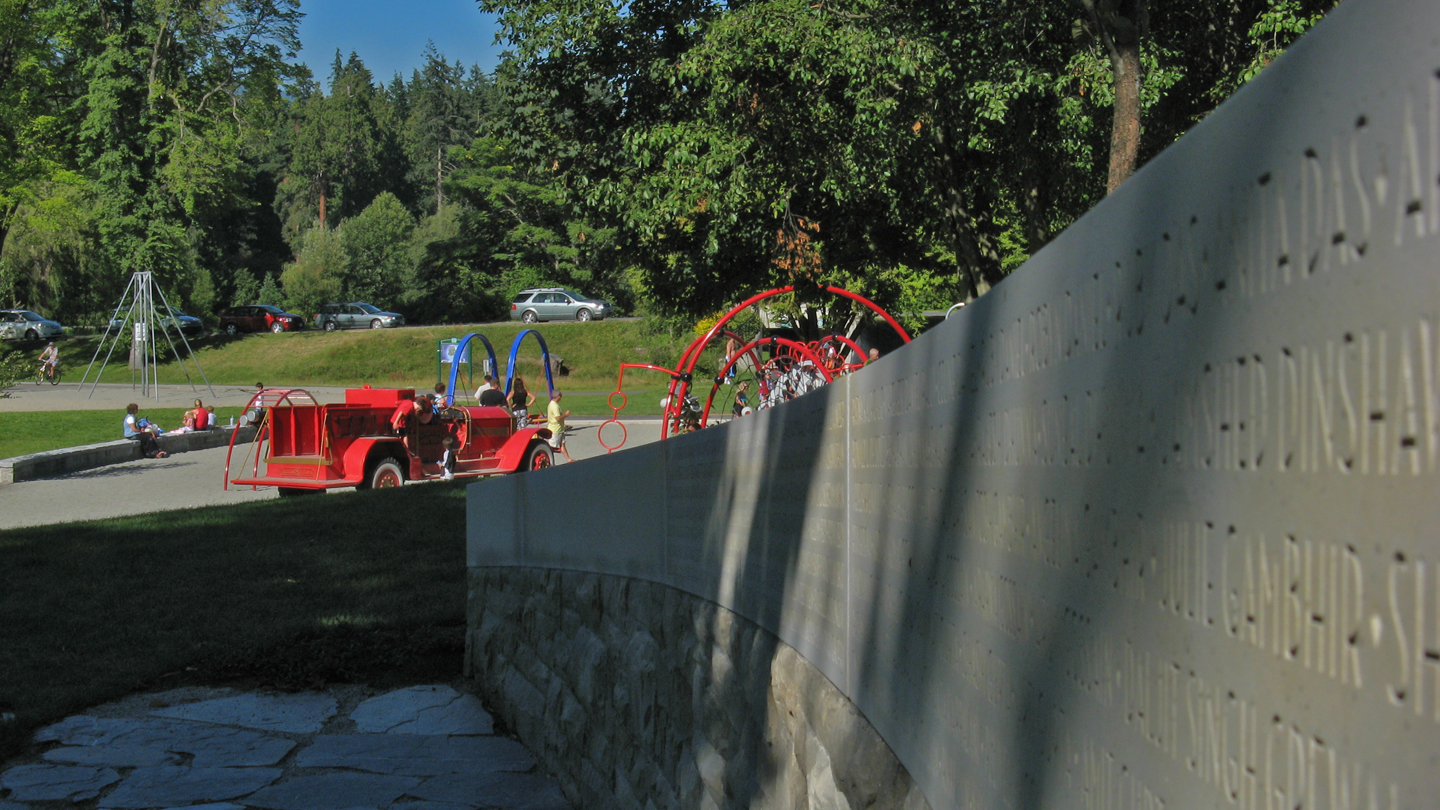
Monument and playground commemorating victims of Flight 182, dedicated July 2007

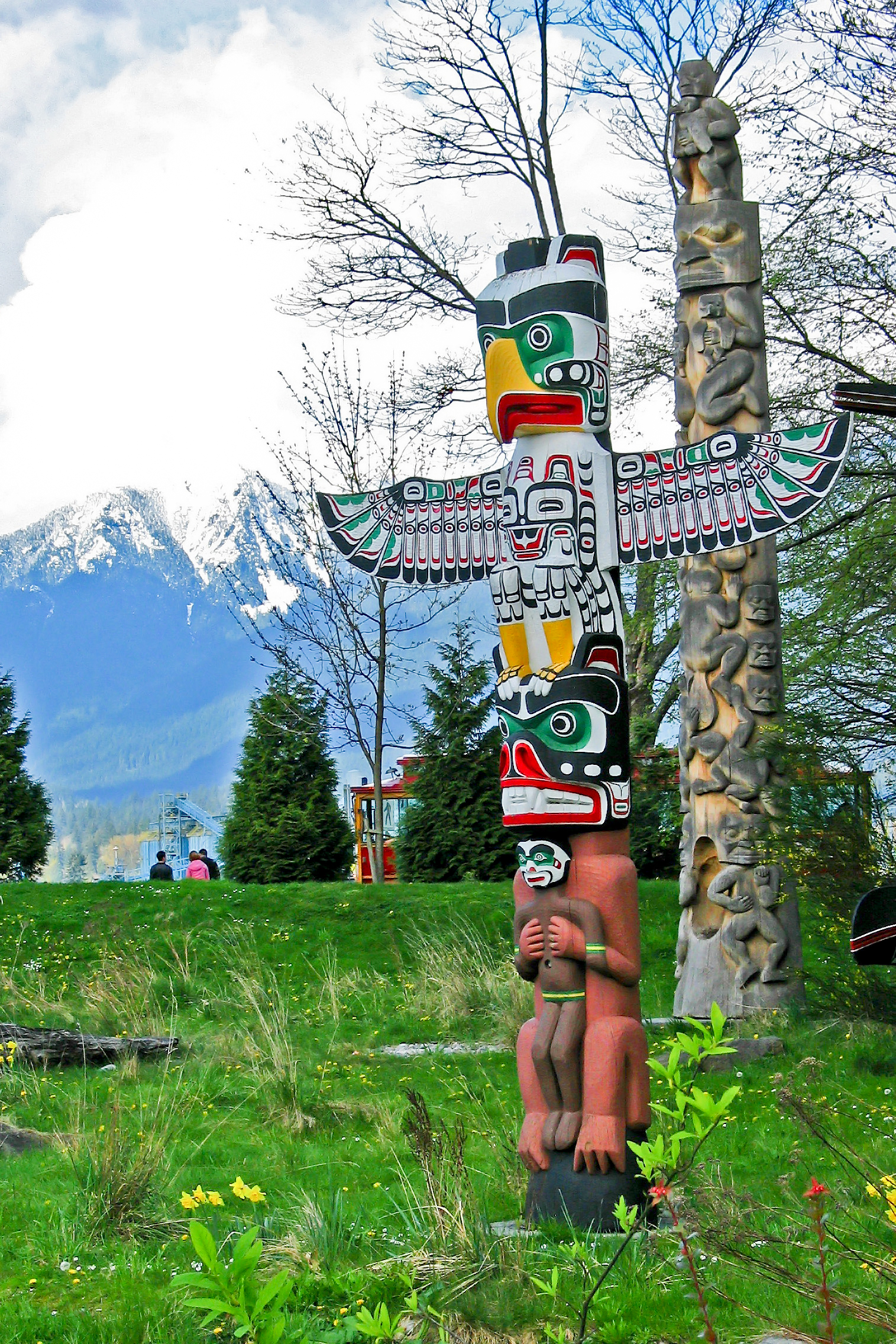
Totem poles with North Shore mountains in the background

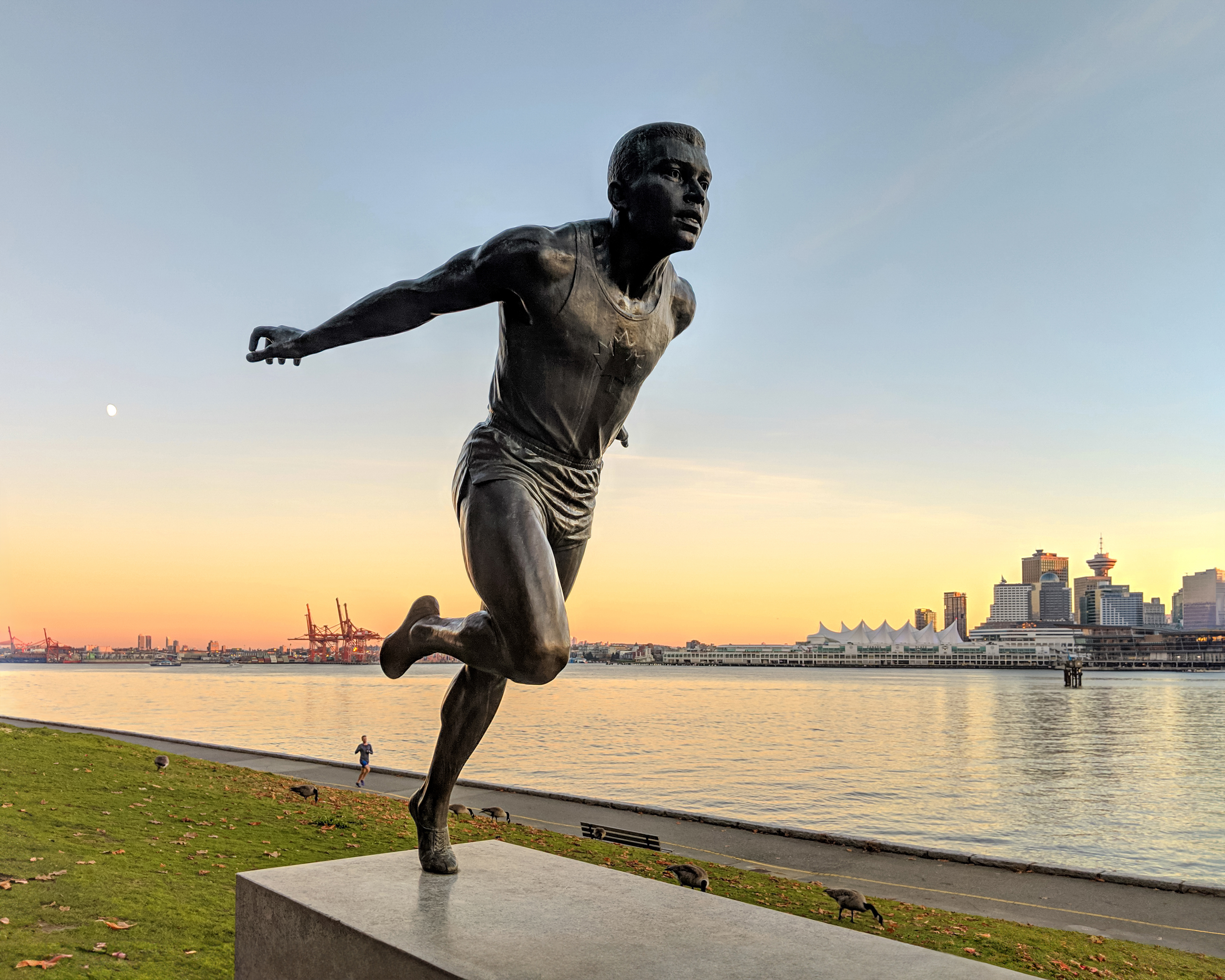
Statue of Harry Jerome

- Air India Flight 182 Monument – The monument and playground, which commemorate Air India Flight 182, were built in 2006 and dedicated in 2007. Located in Ceperley Meadow.
- Chehalis Cross – Memorial commemorating the eight people who died when the Chehalis tugboat sank off Stanley Park after colliding with the MV Princess Victoria in 1906. Located west of Brockton Point.
- Bust of David Oppenheimer – A memorial bust of David Oppenheimer, Vancouver's former mayor (1888–91). The bust was cast in 1911. Located at the English Bay entrance.
- Girl in a Wetsuit – The statue is located by Brockton Point. It was created by Elek Imredy and placed in 1972.
- Harry Jerome – A statue of local Olympic runner Harry Jerome. Located by Brockton Point.
- Japanese Canadian War Memorial – By 1921, a large ceremonial column was built with private donations in memory of Japanese Canadians who gave their lives in World War I. The impressive monument is joined by two rows of Japanese cherry trees (Prunus Shirotae) planted along an axial approach. The best time to view is fall and spring. Located near the aquarium.
- Lord Stanley – Sculpture of Lord Stanley by Sydney March. Unveiled in 1960. Located at the Coal Harbour entrance to the park.
- Pauline Johnson (Tekahionwake) Memorial – A cairn and fountain off the road in a small clearing beside the Teahouse.
- RMS Empress of Japan – Replica figurehead of what was once the fastest ship on the Pacific that operated between 1891 and 1922.
- Robert Burns Memorial – Located at the Coal Harbour entrance to the park.
- Shore to Shore monument - Master Carver Ts’uts’umutlhw Luke Marston created a 14-foot bronze sculpture for Stanley Park, commemorating the adventures of Portuguese Joe and his Coast Salish family. Installed in 2015 near the totem poles in Brockton Point.
- SS Beaver – The SS Beaver ran aground on the rocks below Prospect Point in 1888. A commemorative cairn is located at Prospect Point, next to the Windstorm Monument and the Prospect Point Cafe. One of the walking beams from the original ship is also displayed at Prospect Point (unveiled in 1941).
- Queen Victoria Memorial Fountain – Commemorates Queen Victoria's death. Located on the roadside, at the Coal Harbour entrance to the park.
- Warren G. Harding Memorial – Commemorating Warren G. Harding's (the former 29th US president) visit to the park in the 1920s, a week before his death. Designed by Charles Marega and unveiled in 1925. Located between the Stanley Park Pavilion and Malkin Bowl.
- Windstorm Monument – Monument recognizing the donors who helped with the cleanup efforts after the 2006 windstorm. Located at Prospect Point.

== Plaques ==
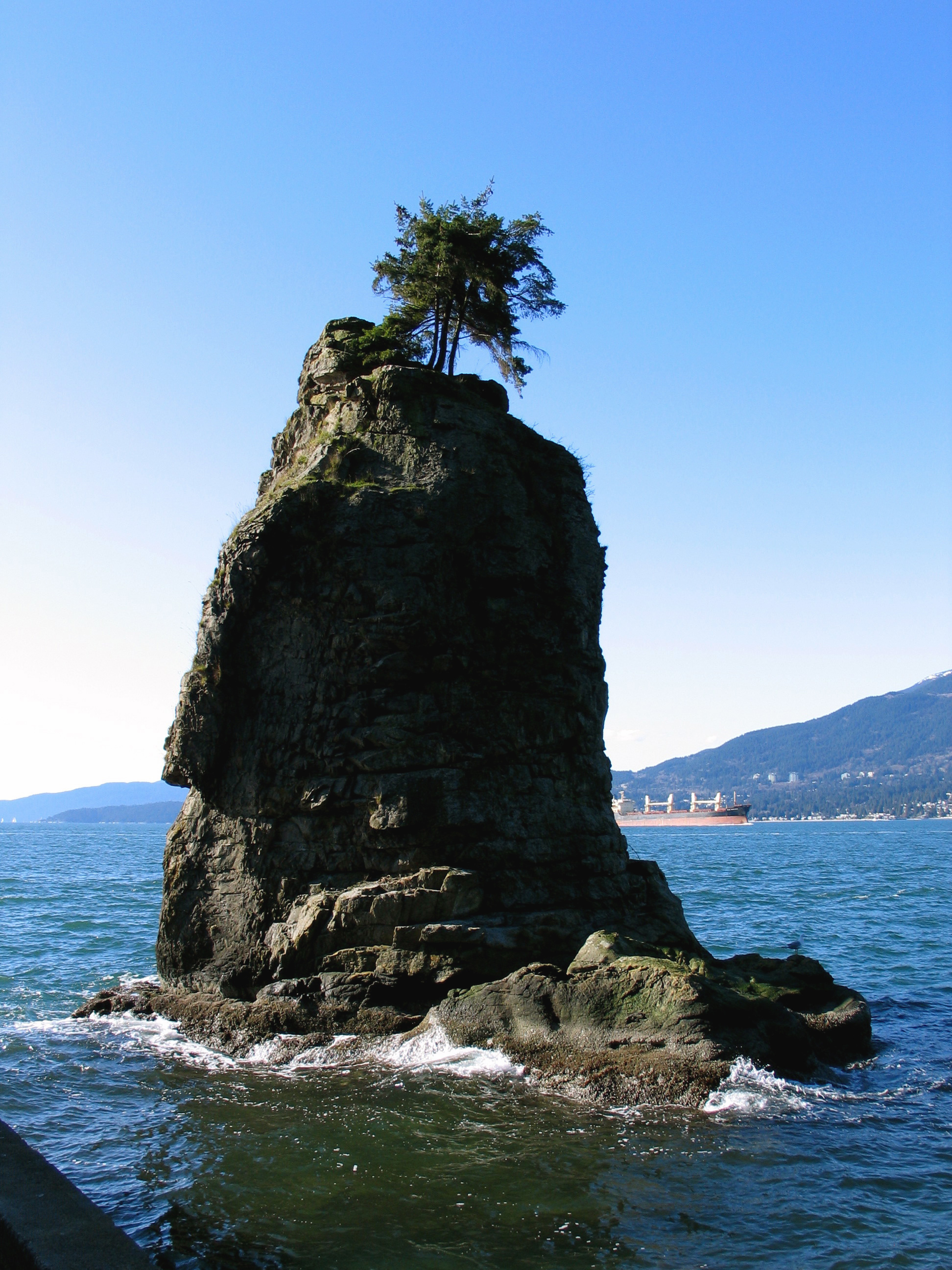
Siwash Rock

- Air Force Garden of Remembrance – The Women's Auxiliary to Air Services established The Air Force Garden of Remembrance in 1948 to commemorate the airmen who gave their lives in the Second World War. A variety of plaques are placed throughout the shade rock garden, flagstone steps, path, small stream, and pond. Wooded area located on a knoll just west of the Stanley Park Pavilion. In 2019 Park Board initiated plans to relocate the Garden of Remembrance to Queen Elizabeth Park.
- Edward Stamp – Located on a boulder beside the seawall between Brockton Point Lighthouse and the Brockton Oval, marking the site of the first logging operations in the park.
- Frances Willard – Commemorating the 100th anniversary of the birth of Frances Willard, an American suffragist known for her efforts in winning the vote for women. Placed in 1939. A white camellia tree was planted too, but only a stump remains. Located in the Rock Garden.
- HMS Egeria Benchmark – Notes a reference point used by the Royal Engineers in 1863 during their survey of Burrard Inlet and the Royal Navy survey ship, HMS Egeria, in 1898. Located west of the 9 O'Clock Gun.
- Hallelujah Point – Marking the site used by the Salvation Army. The name derives from the Hallelujahs that could be heard across Coal Harbour during the Army's meetings here. On the grass near the 9 O'Clock Gun.
- James Cunningham – Plaque inlaid cliffside on the seawall near Siwash Rock in remembrance of Jimmy Cunningham, the master stonemason who directed construction of the seawall for years. Stones were left out of the seawall near this spot, where Cunningham's ashes were laid to rest.
- Port of Vancouver lookout – Plaques explaining Port of Vancouver landmarks.
- SS Beaver – Located on the seawall below Prospect Point.
- Siwash Rock – Plaque tells a popular version its legend.
- Stanley Park Centennial – Plaque placed in 1988 to commemorate the official opening of the park, and marking the spot where Chaythoos once was. Located off the seawall on a knoll between Beaver Lake trail and Lions Gate Bridge.
- World War II – Marking the site of a coastal defence fort. Located in front of the Teahouse at Ferguson Point.

== Commemorative trees ==
A long-standing tradition in the park has been to plant oak trees to commemorate various persons and events. The first reported example was an oak tree planted at Brockton Oval by the Duke of York in 1901. Over the years other trees have been planted to recognize:

- Brockton Point Association – Planted by this association in 1902, this oak is still thriving in its location at the northeast corner of the Brockton Oval.
- Canadian Forestry Corps – Located by the Harding Memorial, the corps is commemorated by a plaque and three oak trees from Windsor, England.
- King Edward VII – This monarch is commemorated by an oak and plaque near Brockton Pavilion.
- Queen Elizabeth II – Her Majesty Queen Elizabeth II is commemorated by a plaque and oak tree, planted in a small grassed area near the golf course.
- John Drainie Memorial – The Canadian Shakespearean actor and broadcaster John Drainie is commemorated by a plaque and dogwood tree in the Shakespeare Garden.
- Peter Z. Caverhill – Also located by the Harding Memorial, this memorial consists of a plaque and commemorative fir tree.
- William Shakespeare Gardens – Located near the Rose Garden Cottage, this garden consists of a relief statue and trees and plants mentioned in the Bard's plays. Created in the 1930s.

== Miscellaneous ==
Lumberman's Arch generally refers to a large clearing and picnic area on the park's northeastern shore. There is also a Lumberman's Arch landmark located across from the concession stand. The arch is a timber-and-stump structure erected in 1952 (a single log propped up by two others). It replaced the original arch that was built by lumber workers in 1912 as organized labour's contribution to the celebration of a visit by the Duke of Connaught. The 1912 arch was a copy of the Parthenon's front, using whole trees for the columns and gable, and was originally located on the Duke's carriage route at Homer and Pender Streets before it was moved to the park. It was torn down in 1947 after succumbing to rot.

Most of the forest trails bear the names of individuals who were instrumental in the city's or Stanley Park's early history:

- Avison Trail: Henry Avison – Stanley Park Superintendent 1888-1895
- Eldon Trail: G. Eldon – Park Board Superintendent 1896-1909
- Lees Trail: A.E. Lees – Park Commissioner 1902-1917
- Merilees Trail: Harold Merilees – General Manager of Tourism Vancouver in the 1960s
- Rawlings Trail: W.S. Rawlings – longest trail for the Park Board's longest serving Superintendent
- Tatlow Trail: R.G. Tatlow – Park Commissioner 1888-1905
- Thompson Trail: C.W. Thompson – Park Commissioner 1937-1938; 1940-1942
- Tisdall Trail: C.E. Tisdall – Park Commissioner 1904-1909; 1926-1934

== Gallery ==
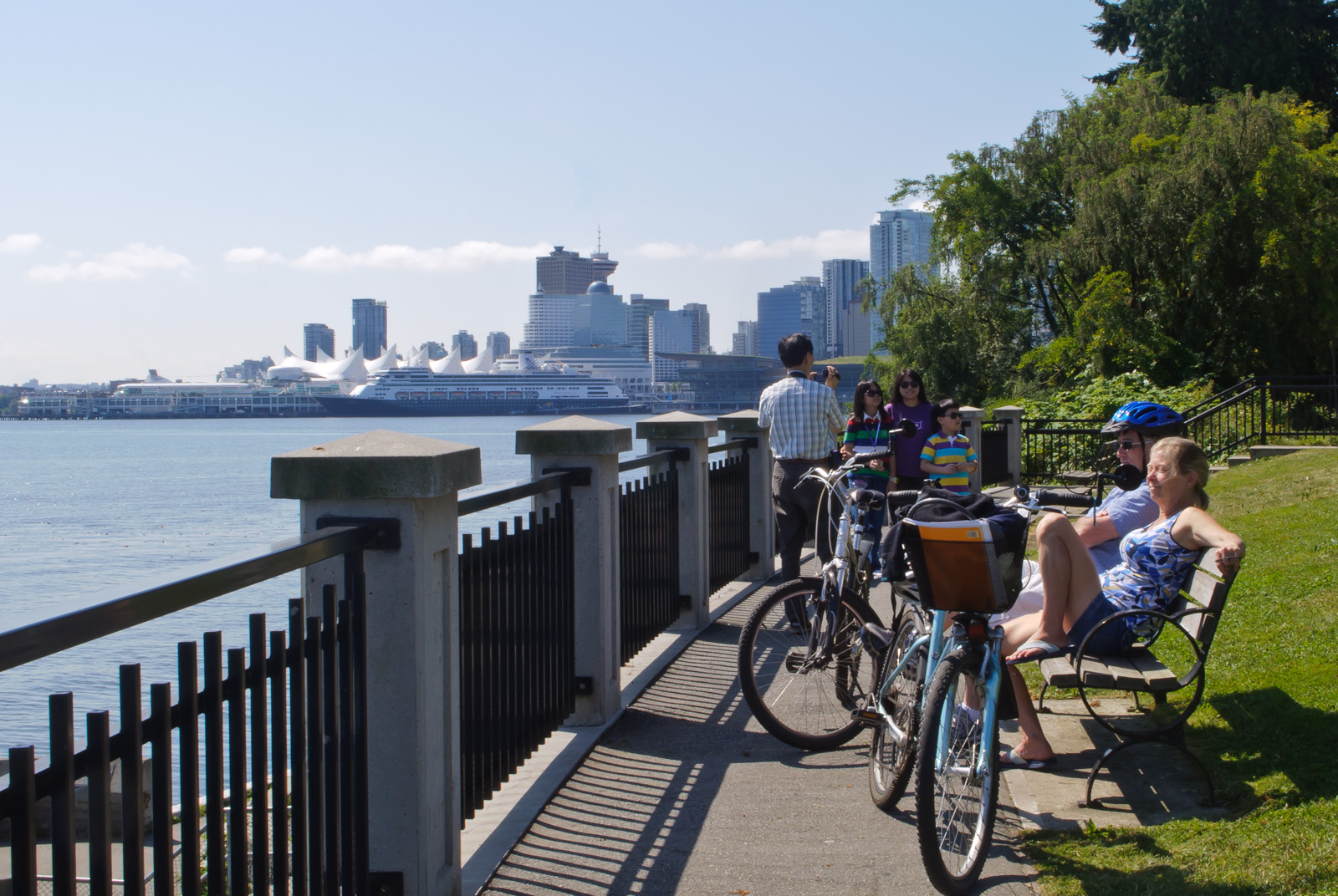
Vancouver's iconic cruise ship terminal from Brockton Point

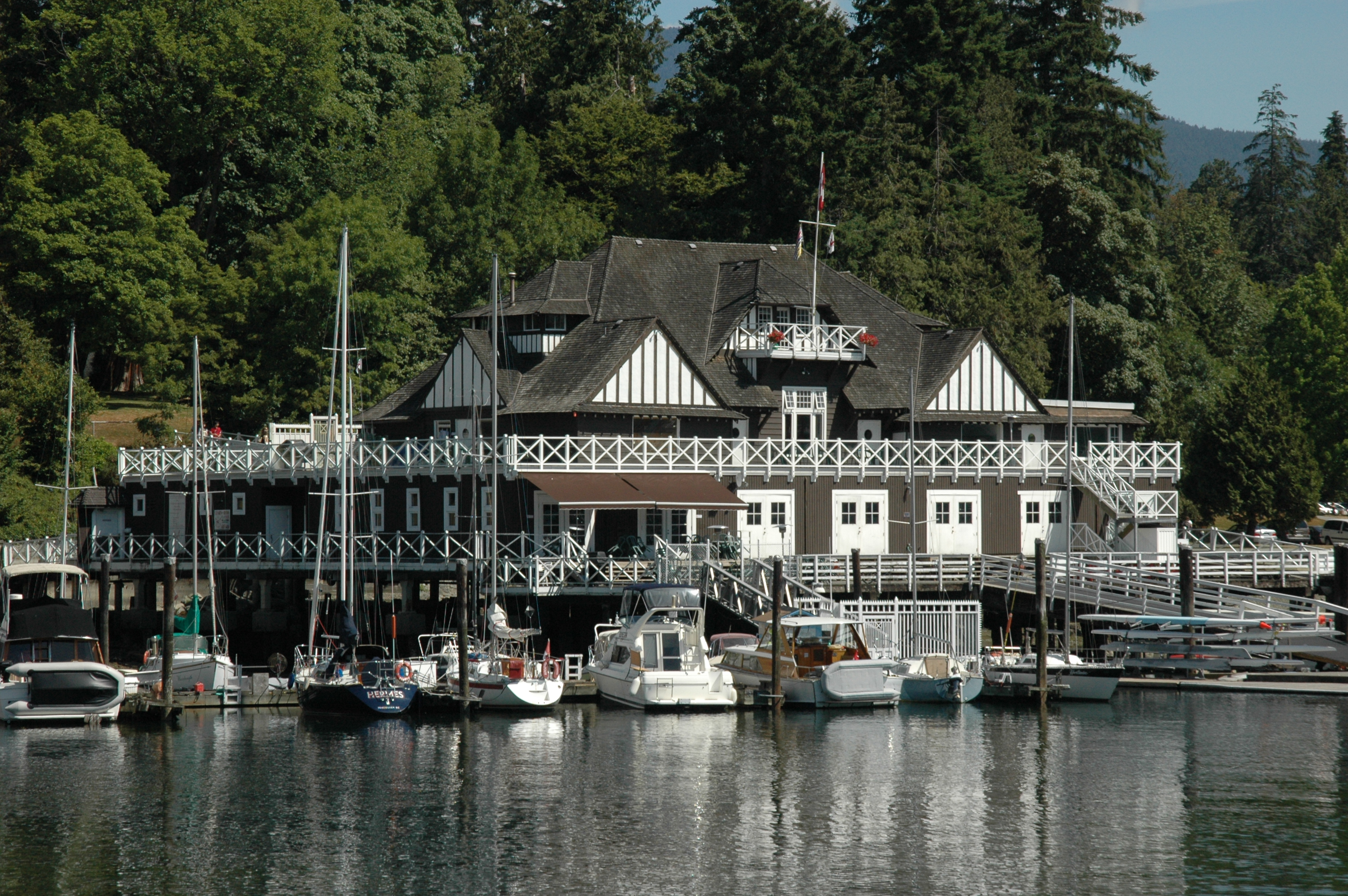
Vancouver Rowing Club in Coal Harbour

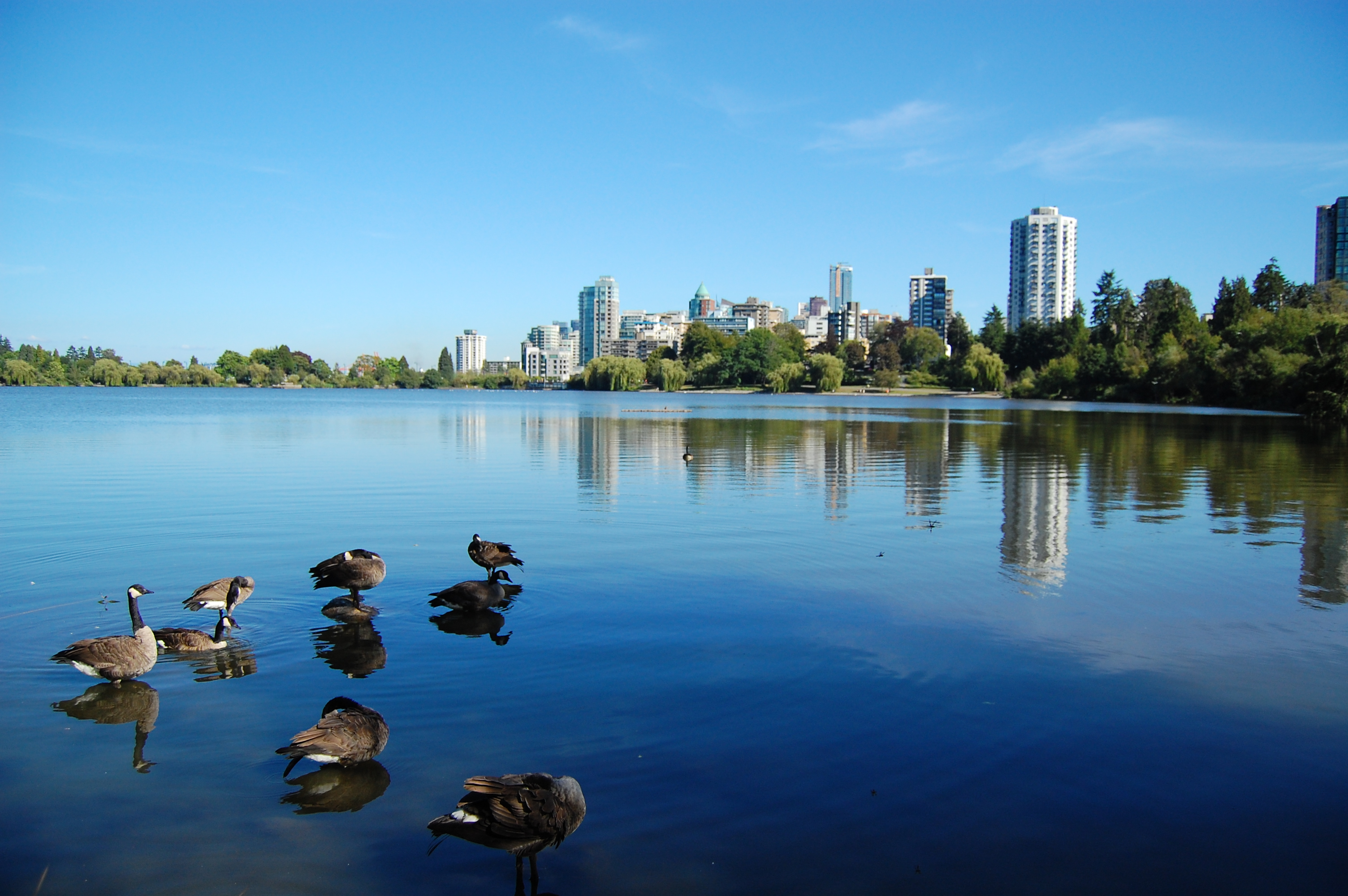
Canada geese on Lost Lagoon with Downtown Vancouver in background

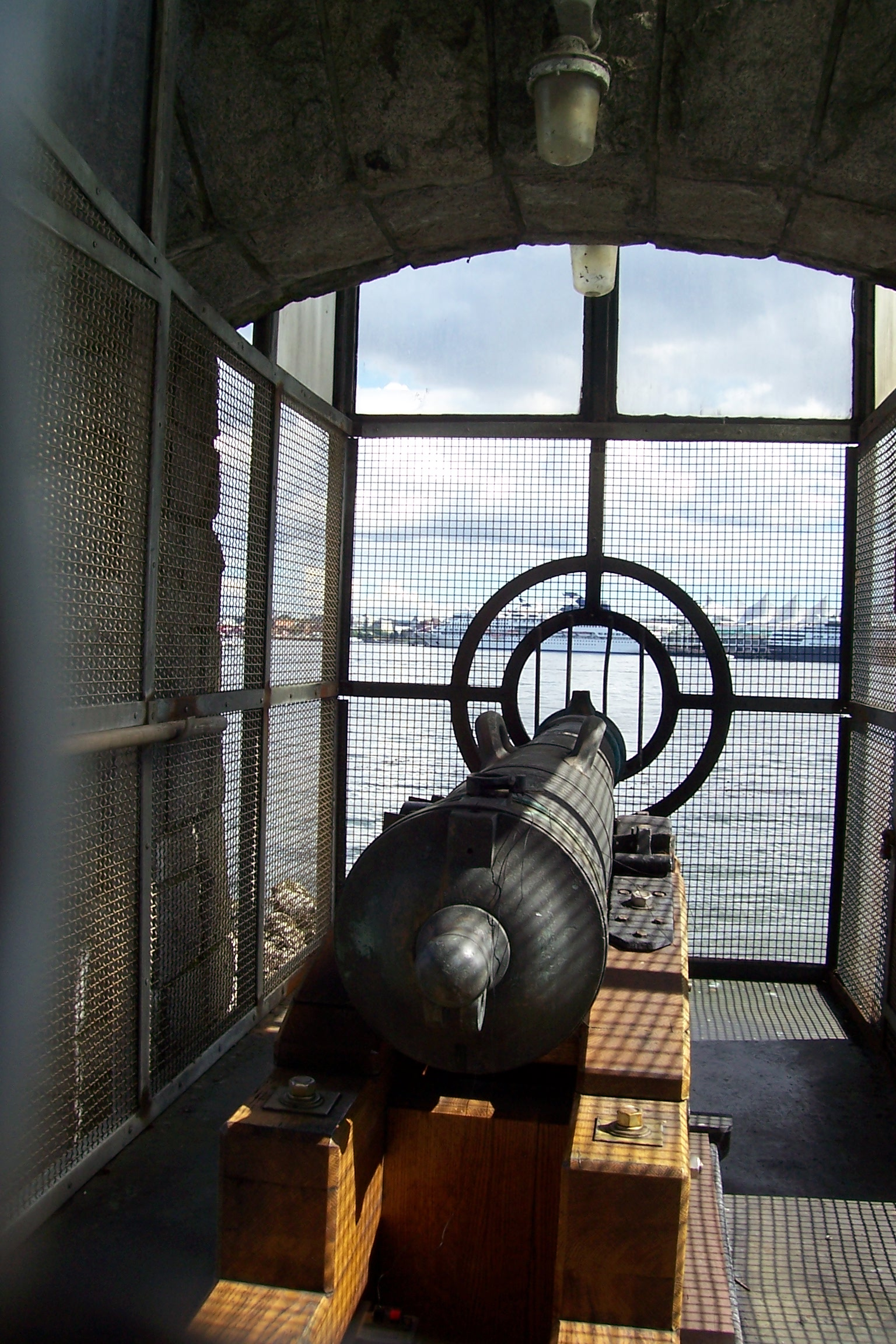
Close up of the 9 O'Clock Gun

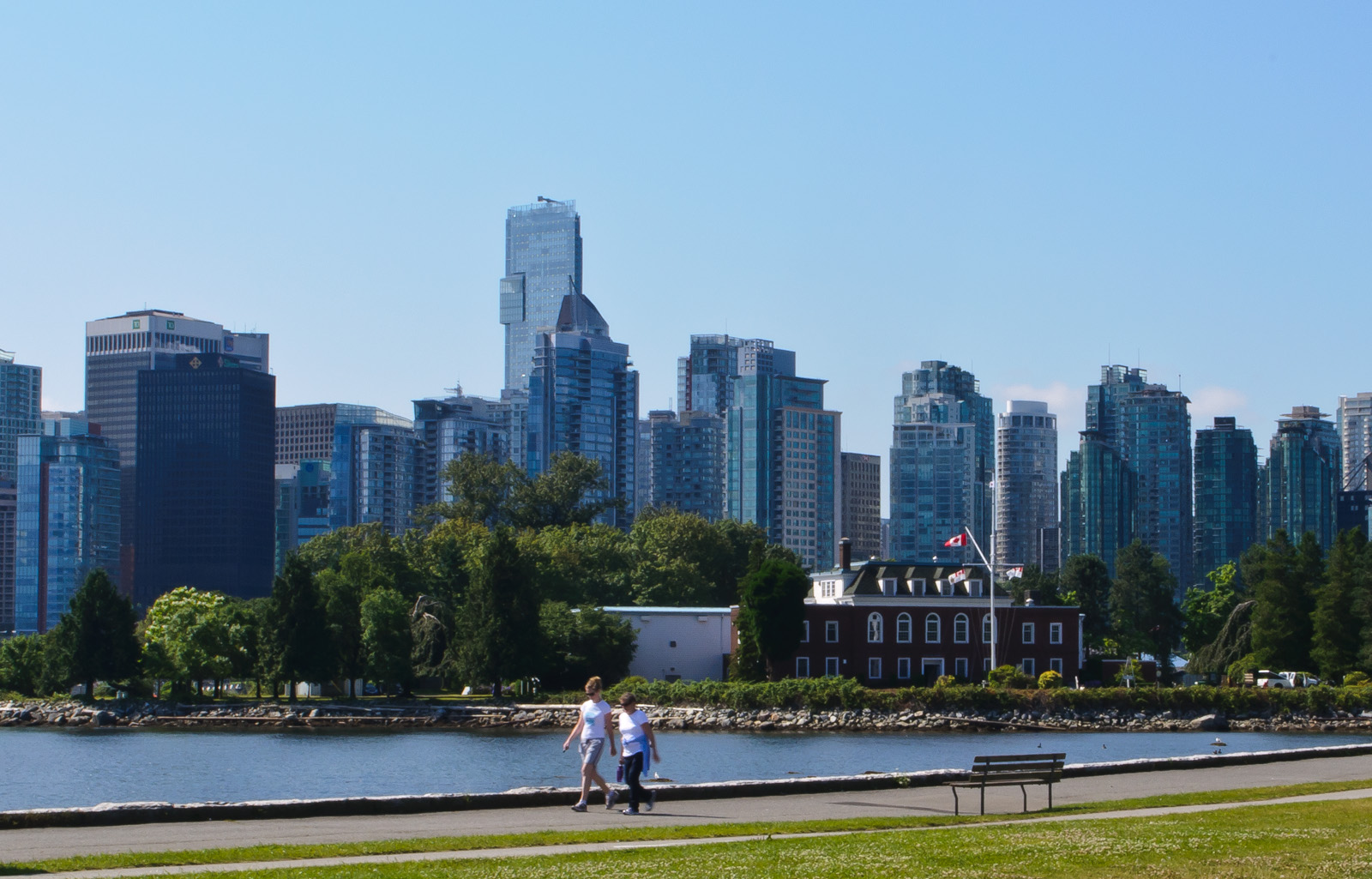
View of Deadman's Island and the HMCS Discovery Building from Stanley Park

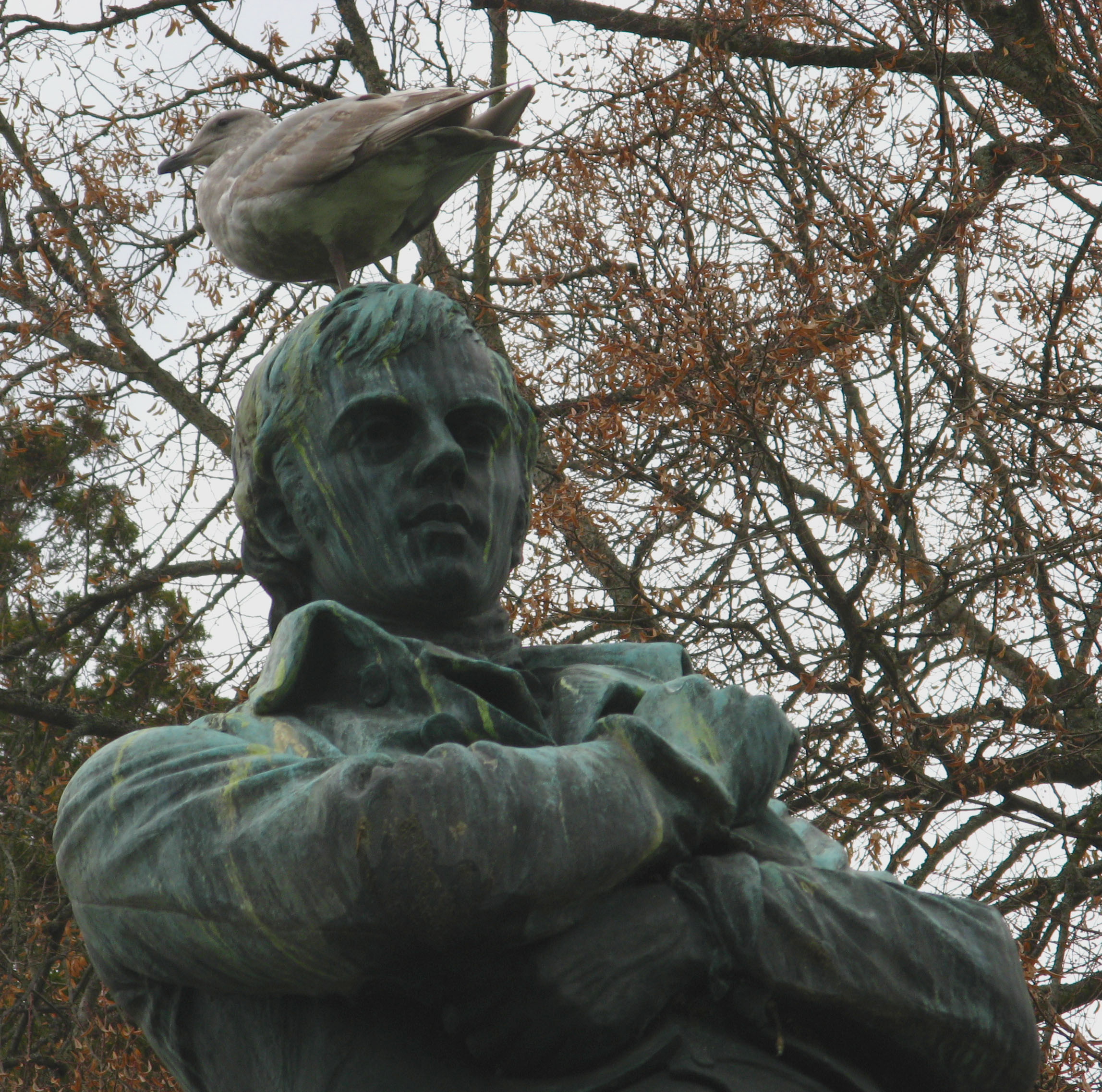
Robert Burns Memorial

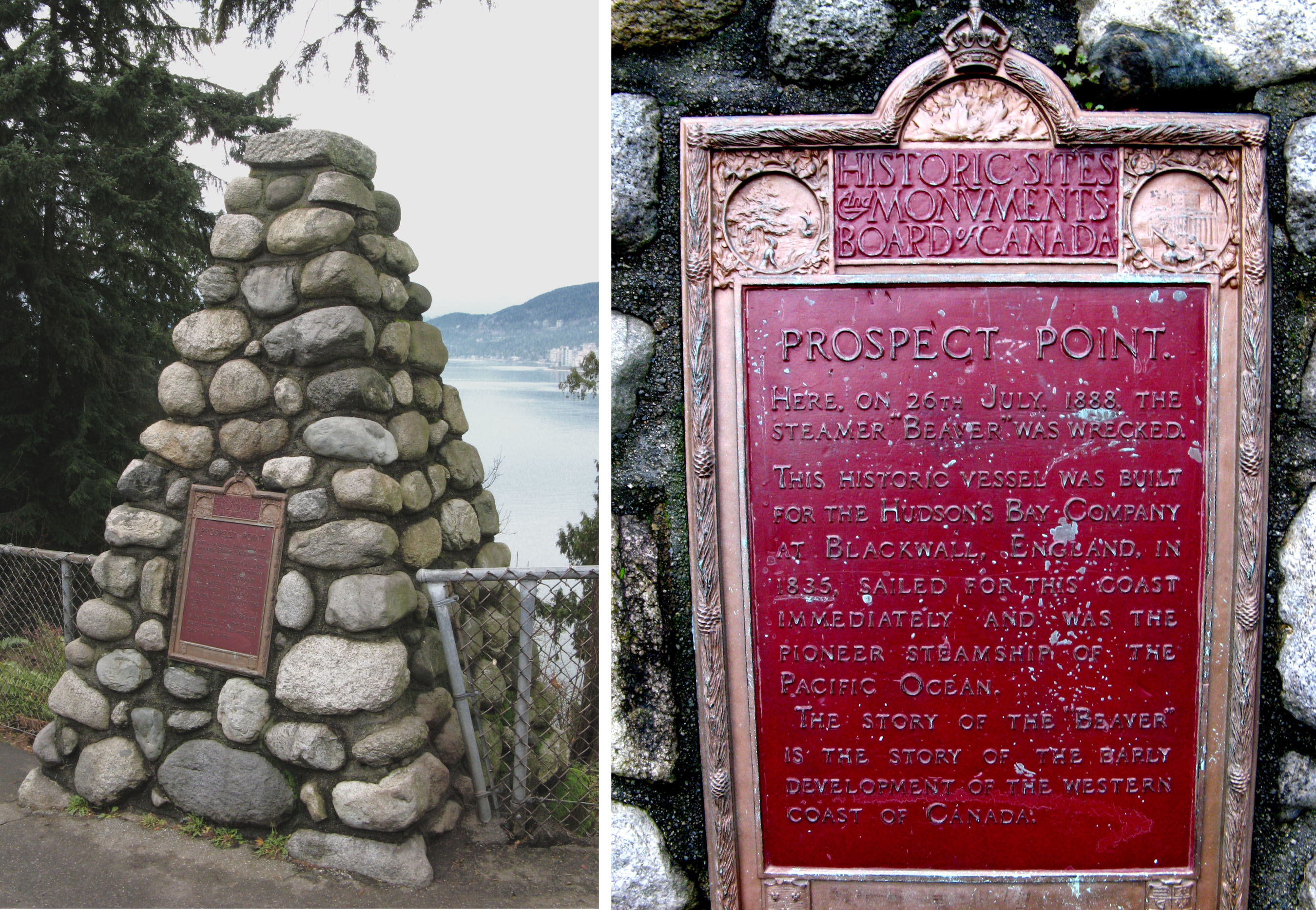
Commemorative cairn for the SS Beaver

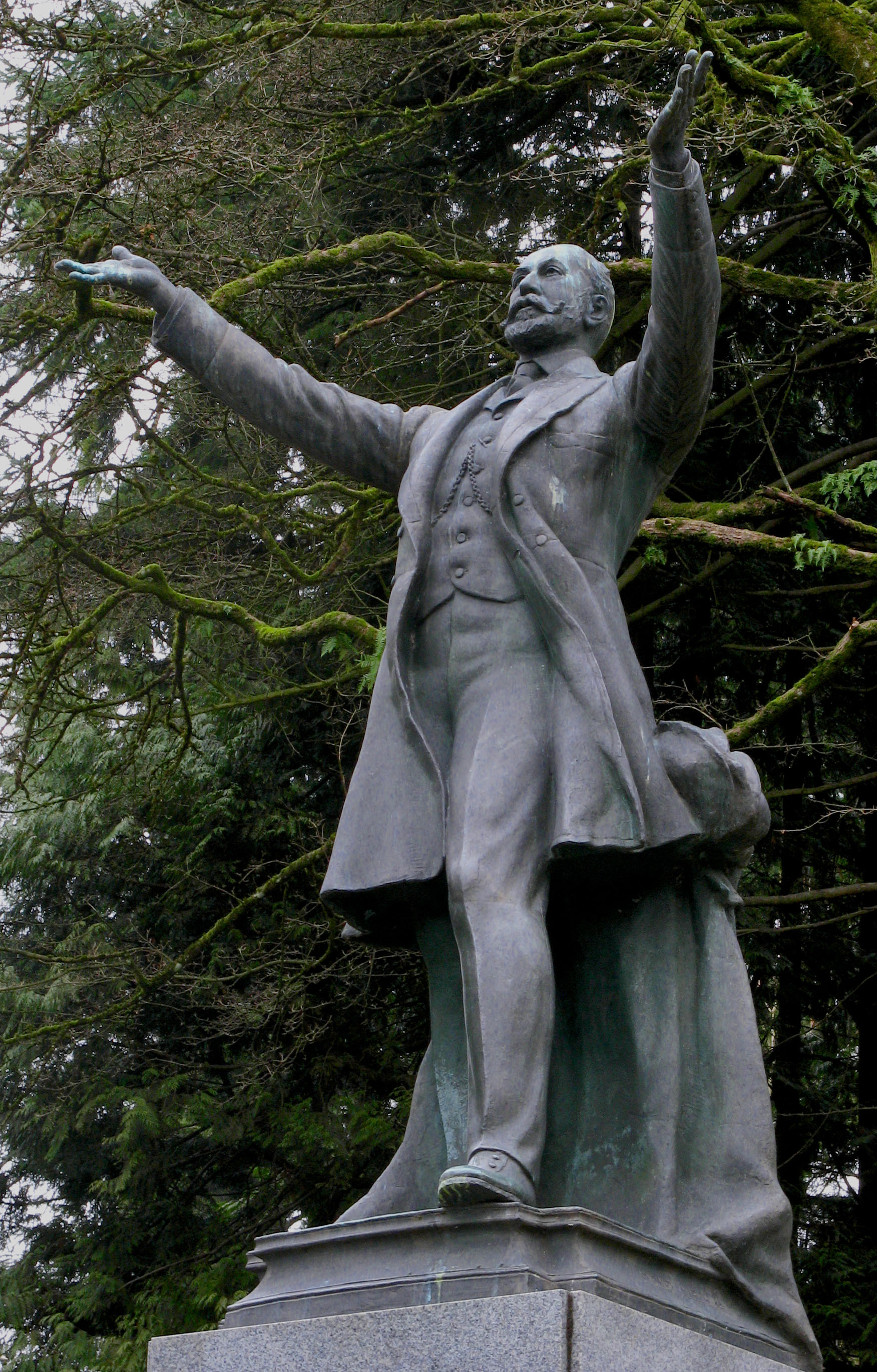
Statue of Lord Stanley

== See also ==
- Pacific Spirit Regional Park
- Capilano Suspension Bridge
- Grouse Mountain
- Cypress Provincial Park
- Whistler
- MacMillan Provincial Park
