= Frank Gowen =

Canadian photographer

- Born: November 1, 1878; Sutton Benger, Wiltshire, England
- Died: February 3, 1946 (aged 67); Vancouver, British Columbia, Canada
- Occupation: Photographer

Frank Henry Gowen (1878–1946) was a Canadian photographer. He grew up in Wiltshire, England, and served an apprenticeship with a London photographer. Gowen emigrated to Canada and in 1905 he opened a studio in Brandon, Manitoba. He moved to Vancouver in 1913, and starting three years later, he acquired the position of official photographer to Stanley Park. In 1920, he formed a partnership with Alfred Sutton to form the Gowen Sutton Company. It became one of the largest Canadian publishers of real photo postcards. Gowen ended his partnership with Sutton in 1930. He then opened a souvenir kiosk at Prospect Point in Stanley Park which he operated until two years before his death in 1946.

== Early years and Brandon ==
Frank Henry Gowen was born in Sutton Benger, Wiltshire, on 1 November 1878, the second of four children. His father, Reginald Gowen, owned a furniture store in Melksham, Wiltshire. As a young man, Frank Gowen belonged to the Melksham Camera Club and he was apprenticed to an unknown London photographer. Afterwards, Gowen accompanied his younger brother Reginald to Manitoba who was looking for a job on a farm. Frank Gowen returned to England, but he soon needed to go back to Canada when his brother was stricken with typhoid fever. He decided to settle, and in 1905, Gowen opened a photography studio in Brandon, Manitoba. He specialized in scenic photography while also taking studio portraits and pursuing some commercial work. Gowen preferred not to engage in newspaper assignments, as he didn't want to capitalize on people's misfortunes. On 30 March 1907, he married Nellie Gertrude Hearn in Brandon. They eventually had three daughters and one son. By 1911, Gowen owned a branch studio in nearby Wawanesa. During the last two years of his stay in Manitoba, he maintained a partnership with the photographer Alexander Davidson, as the firm Davidson & Gowen, photographers and sellers of art supplies.

== Vancouver ==
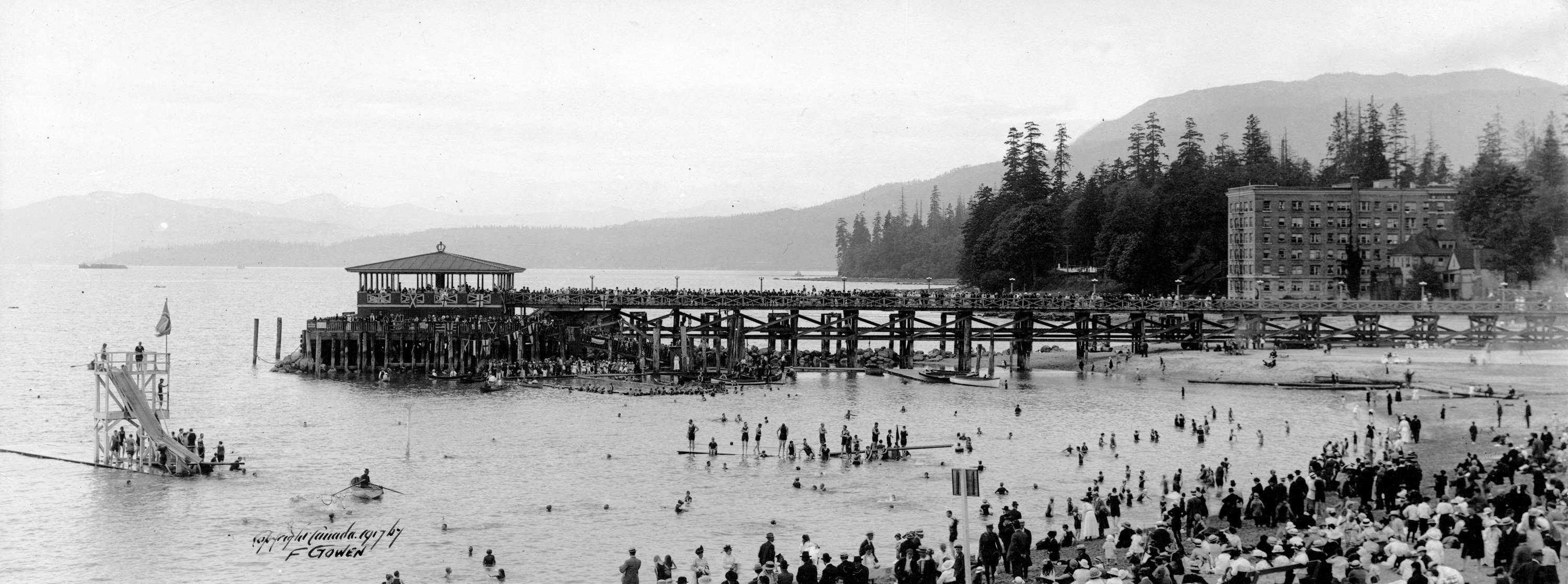
English Bay Pier, Vancouver. 1917.

In 1913, Frank Gowen and his family moved to Burnaby, British Columbia, while maintaining an office in Vancouver. He sold his first postcards in the following year, and decided to make them the mainstay of his business. At first, he also drove a jitney to provide extra income. In 1915, he had a brief partnership with S.L. Stevens before occupying his own studio. Gowen also performed contract work with the Dominion Photo Company. In 1916, he won the exclusive right to take commercial photos of the Hollow Tree and Prospect Point in Stanley Park.

In 1918, Gowen met Alfred James Sutton, who had operated a photographic studio in Moose Jaw, Saskatchewan. The two men formed a partnership, initially named the F. Gowen Company, and then in 1920, the Gowen Sutton Company. Gowen was the principal photographer while Sutton was responsible for developing and printing, as well as sales. A third partner and photographer, Joseph Frederick Spalding, joined the firm in 1924 as sales manager and secretary-treasurer. Spalding left the company in 1928, going on to become one of Gowen's competitors in the postcard business, along with Leonard Frank and Philip Timms.

In 1929, Gowen's wife died of pneumonia. In the following year, he sold his shares in the Gowen Sutton company. In 1932, the Vancouver Park Board granted Gowen the right to build and operate a souvenir kiosk at Prospect Point in Stanley Park. He sold postcards, pictures, Indigenous crafts, miniature totem poles, and tourist items. The kiosk was open from Easter to Thanksgiving, and in the winter, Gowen and his two daughters Evelyn and Kathleen hand tinted photographs for a Banff photographer, George Noble. In the early 1930s, Gowen entered a relationship with a woman thirty years his junior, Alma Leonard Salt. They had one son and married in 1935.

For the 1939 royal tour of Canada, Gowen created two albums of coloured photographs of Stanley Park for the Earl of Derby, as well as the princesses Elizabeth and Margaret. During the same year, Gowen opened The Wigwam on Granville Street in Vancouver, a successful tourist shop selling a broad range of products. In 1944, his lease at Prospect Point was not renewed. Gowen suffered from declining health in the 1940s, and he died of kidney failure on 3 February 1946 in Vancouver. He is buried in Ocean View Cemetery in Burnaby.

== Photography ==
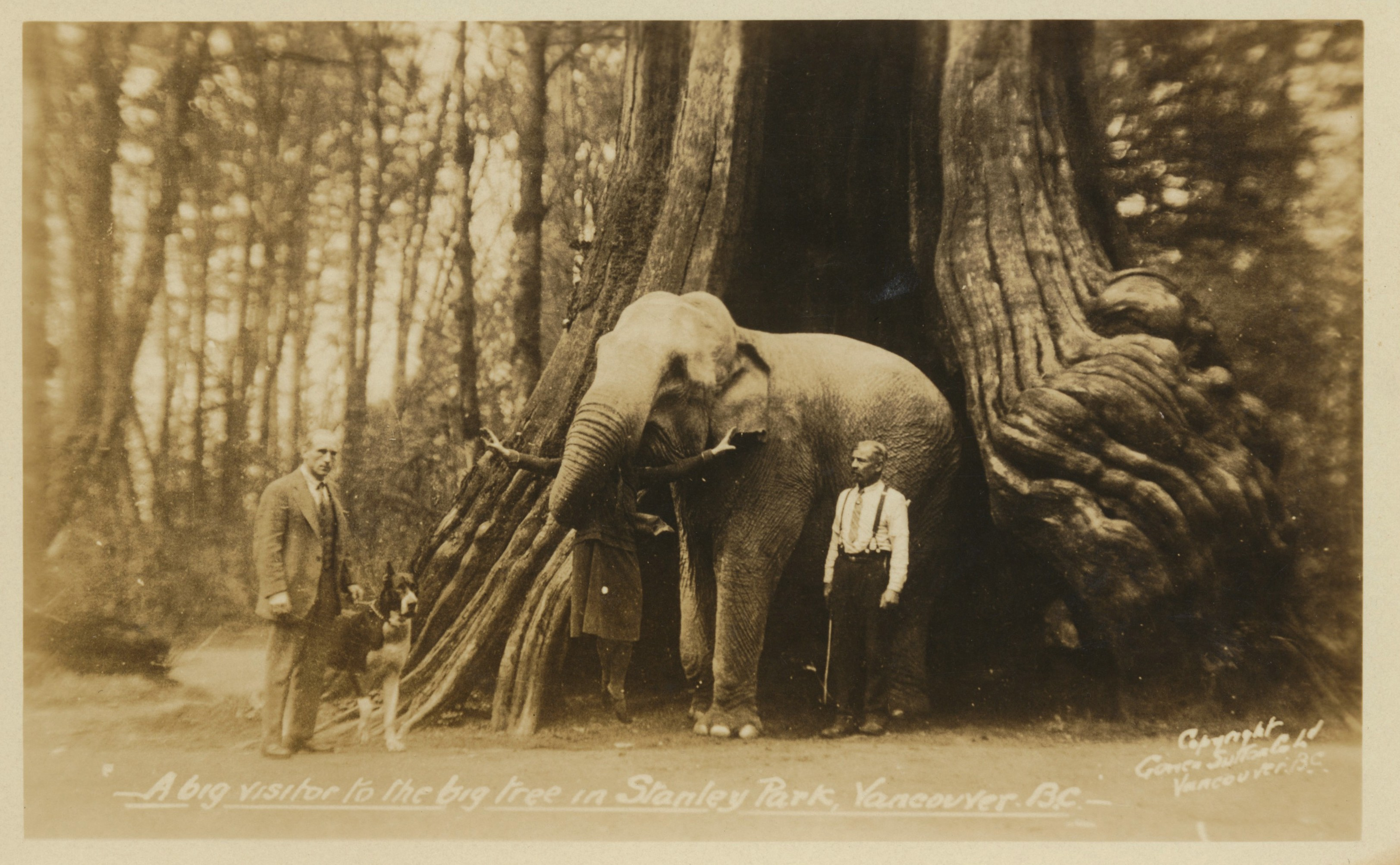
Elephant at Hollow Tree, Stanley Park, Vancouver. Circa 1925.

In Brandon, Gowen specialized in scenic photography, while also producing portraits of Ukrainian immigrants and undertaking commercial work. Sites that he photographed included the Central Fire Station, Rideau Park, the Assiniboine River, and laying the Brandon street railway tracks. He also illustrated a special edition of the Brandon Sun, titled the Harvest Edition, on 1 November 1912.

Soon after arriving in Vancouver, Gowen began to focus on postcards. They were all real photos except for two dozen coloured collotypes of Vancouver printed in Germany in the early 1920s. His most profitable area was the few blocks between Seymour and Burrard streets in downtown Vancouver. His postcards were financially successful, selling in the thousands. Gowen also issued photographs in other formats, such as sets of photographic panels, and envelopes or cardboard folders containing miniatures. As a sideline he produced matted and framed local views.

Besides Vancouver, Gowen took photographs of nearby localities such as Capilano Canyon, Sechelt, and the beach at White Rock. He published sets for other British Columbia locations, such as Victoria and Vanderhoof. Gowen produced series of postcards along the rail lines of the Canadian Pacific Railway and the Canadian Northern Railway, in addition to their coastal steamships and hotels. Another series depicted the Union Steamship Company, featuring their vessels and resorts.

== Legacy ==
The Gowen Sutton Company remained in business for forty years, eventually producing over 5000 real photo postcards, likely more than any other Canadian publisher.

In 2015, forty seven of Gowen's views, paired with modern photographs of the same places taken by Graham Street, were exhibited at the Daly House Museum and the Tommy McLeod Curve Gallery at Brandon University. Gowen's photographs showcased the architectural history of Brandon, depicting the city in a time of great expansion.

== Sources ==
- "Brandon 'Then and Now' explored in photo exhibit". The Brandon Sun. 31 January 2015. ProQuest 2545852366.
- "Frank Gowen then-and-now photo exhibit shows evolution of Brandon, Man". The Canadian Press. Toronto. 13 January 2015. ProQuest 1645851147.
- Henry, Christy M.; Trott, Eileen (Winter 2015). "Gowen's Brandon: Then & Now". Manitoba History (77). Manitoba Historical Society. Archived from the original on 17 May 2022.
- Souch, B.R. (2010). Historical Picture Postcards Published by the Gowen, Sutton Co. Ltd.: Views of British Columbia and Beyond from the 1920s to the 1950s (2nd ed.). Vancouver.
- Souch, B.R. (2022). "Gowen, Frank". Landscape Photographers of British Columbia: The First Century – 1858 to 1958. Vancouver.
- Thirkell, Fred; Scullion, Bob (2001). Frank Gowen's Vancouver 1914–1931. Surrey, British Columbia: Heritage House Publishing Company. ISBN 1-894384-25-3.
