= Robert Burns Memorial =

Robert Burns Memorial may refer to:

- Robert Burns Memorial (Montreal), Quebec, Canada
- Robert Burns Memorial (Barre), Vermont
- Robert Burns Memorial, Stanley Park, Vancouver, British Columbia, Canada

== See also ==
- List of Robert Burns memorials
