= Hollow tree (disambiguation) =

Hollow tree may refer to a tree hollow, a semi-enclosed cavity in the trunk or branch of a tree.

Hollow tree may also refer to:

- Hollow Tree, a landmark in Stanley Park, Vancouver
- The Hollow Tree, an autumn maple in Lai Chi Wo, Hong Kong
- Hollow Tree, Tasmania, a rural locality in Tasmania
- Hollow Tree, Neath Port Talbot, a tree in Gnoll Country Park, Wales
- The Hollow Tree, a novel by Janet Lunn
