= Third Beach =

Beach in British Columbia, Canada

- Beach
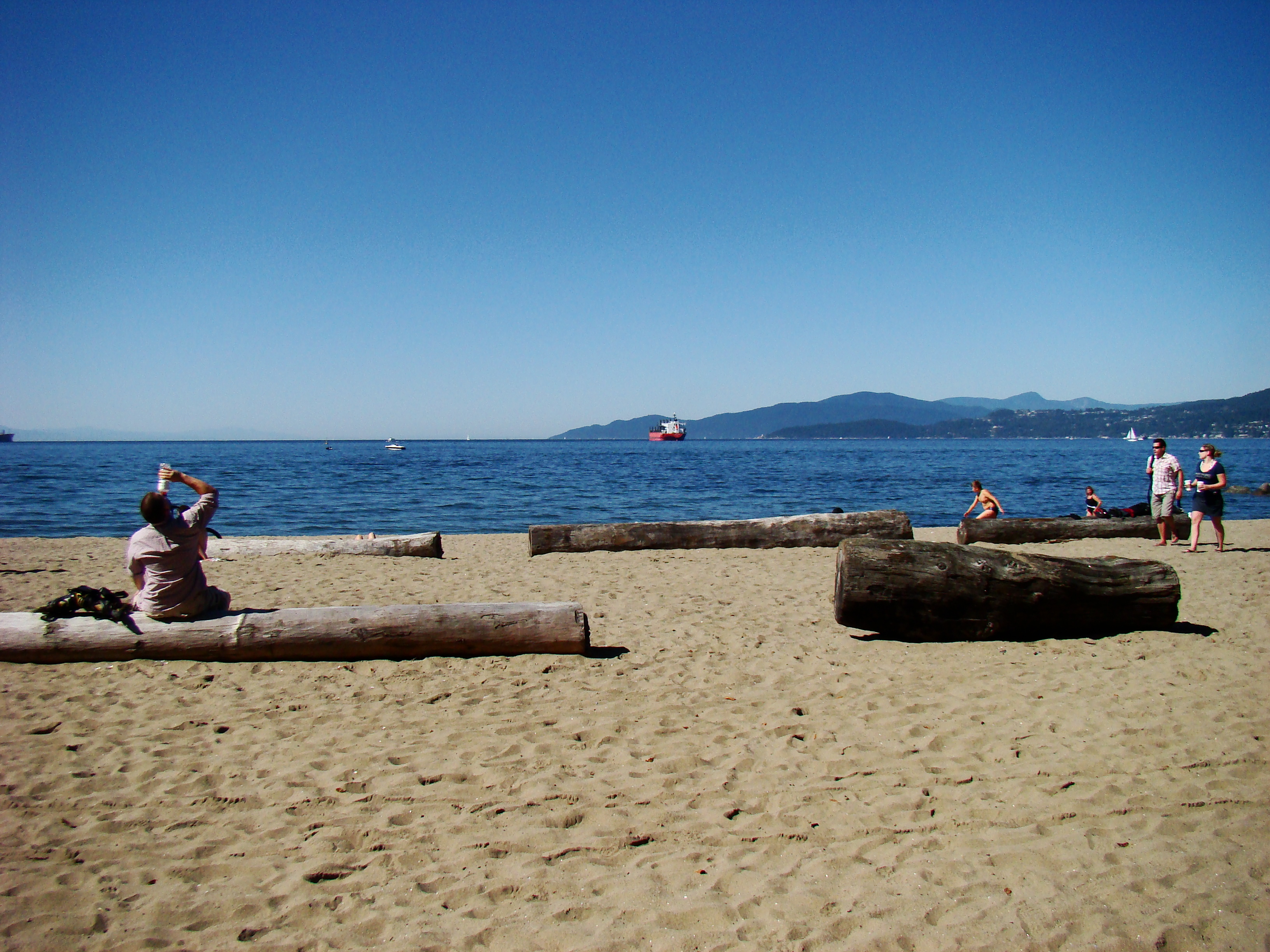
- The beach in 2009

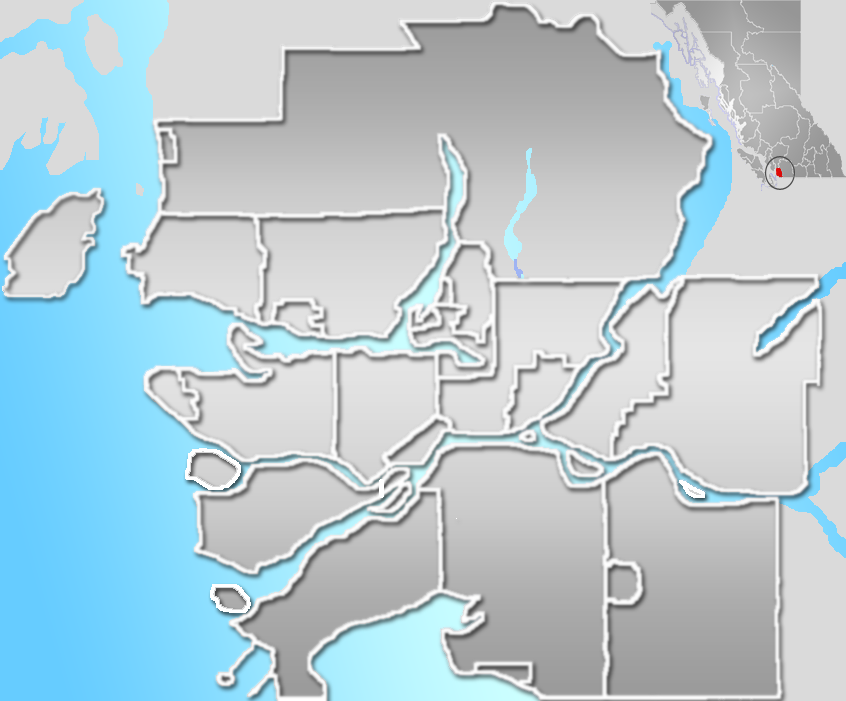
- Coordinates: 49.3041°N 123.1567°W
- Topo map: NTS 92G6 North Vancouver

Third Beach is located at Ferguson Point in Stanley Park in Vancouver, British Columbia.
