= Chehalis Cross =

Celtic cross memorial in Vancouver, British Columbia, Canada

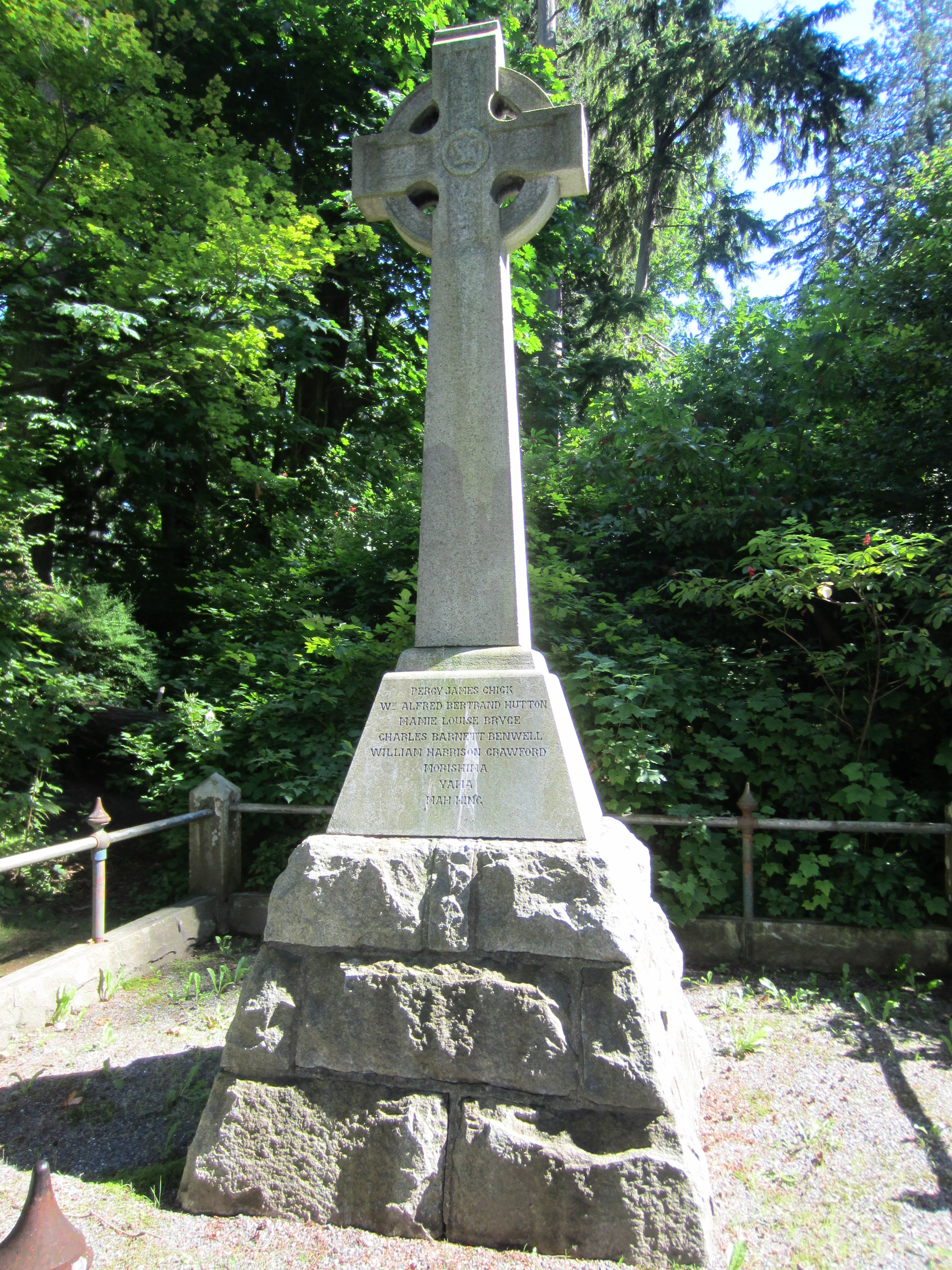
- The monument in 2013
- Interactive map of Chehalis Cross
- Location: Vancouver, British Columbia, Canada
- Coordinates: 49.2994°N 123.1190°W
- Type: Memorial
- Dedicated to: Eight people who died when the tugboat Chehalis sank off Stanley Park

The Chehalis Cross, or Chehalis Monument, is a Celtic cross memorial commemorating the eight people who died when the tugboat Chehalis sank off Stanley Park. The monument is installed west of Brockton Point in Vancouver, British Columbia.

== Sinking of the Chehalis ==
The 18.1-metre (59.3 ft) wooden steam ship Chehalis, owned by the Union S.S. Company of Vancouver, sank at about 2 p.m. July 21, 1906, killing 8 of the 15 people on board, following a collision with the Canadian Pacific Railway's Princess Victoria, a 91-metre (300 ft) steam ship. The seven survivors were rescued by the keeper of the nearby Brockton Point lighthouse.

The Chehalis had been chartered to carry passengers to British Columbia's north coast and had just embarked from North Vancouver in fine weather, passing Brockton Point while heading out of Burrard Inlet. The Princess Victoria embarked from the Canadian Pacific Railway dock in Vancouver carrying 219 passengers. The Princess Victoria corrected its course for a small launch before running over the Chehalis. The official investigation blamed the Princess Victoria for the collision.
