= 9 O'Clock Gun =

Cannon in Vancouver that fires daily

Coordinates: 49.29804°N 123.11755°W

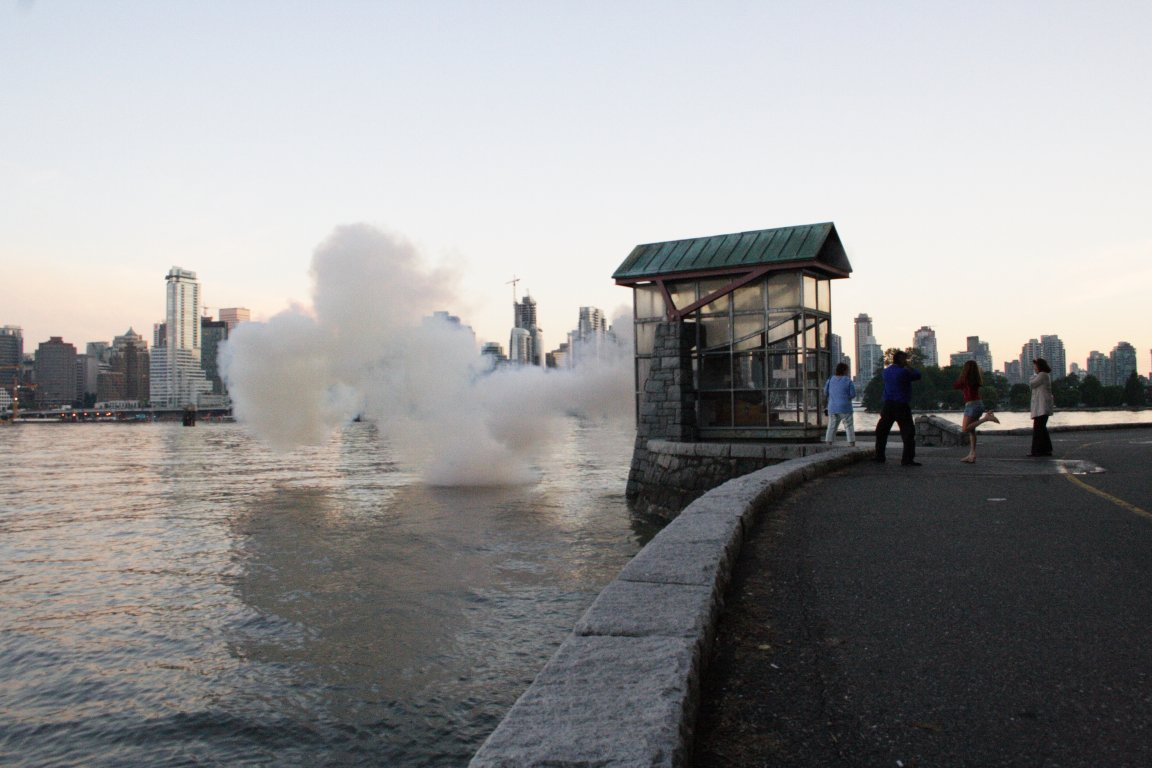
The 9 O'Clock Gun firing in June, 2006

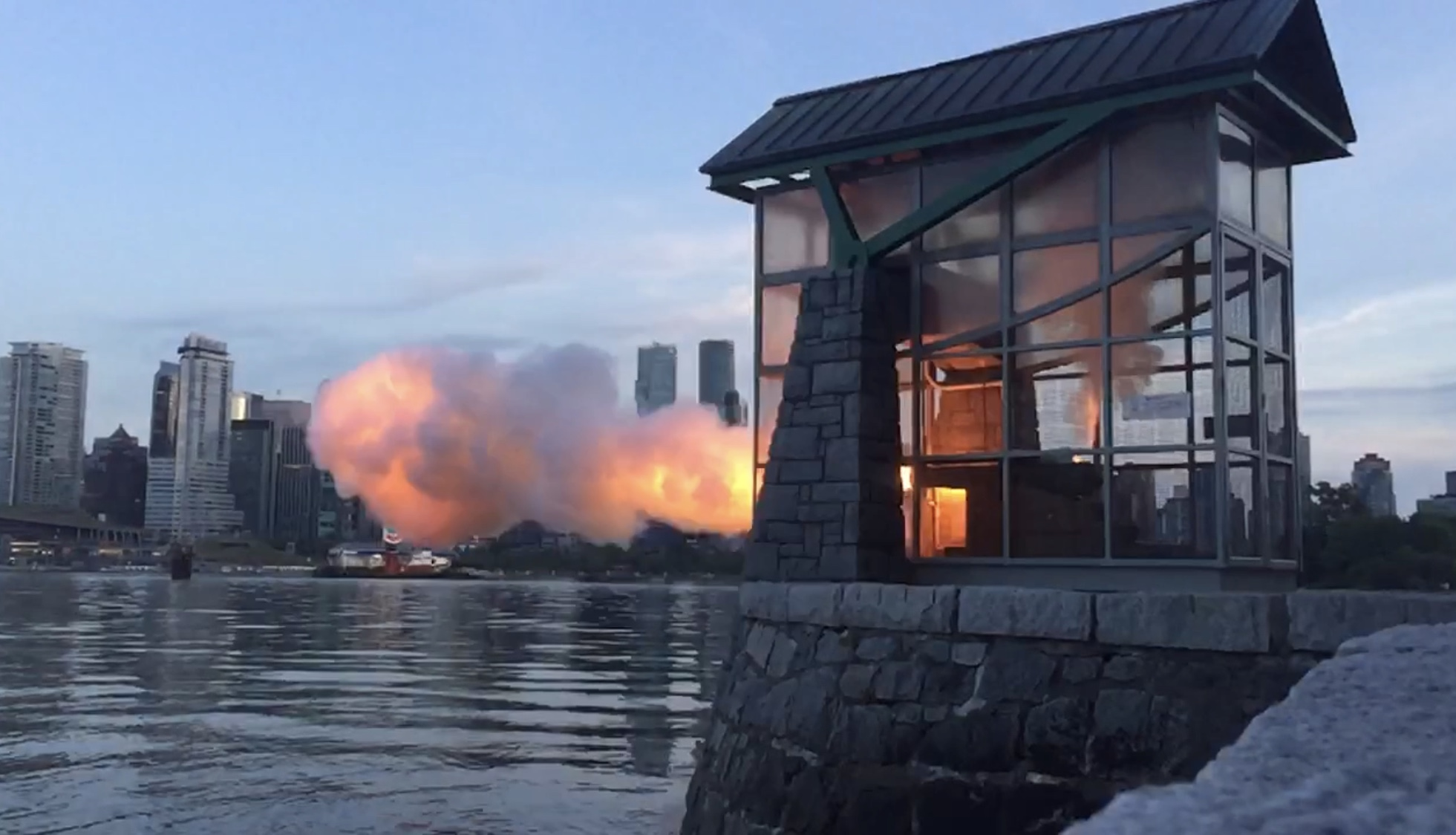
The 9 O'Clock Gun firing in May 2017

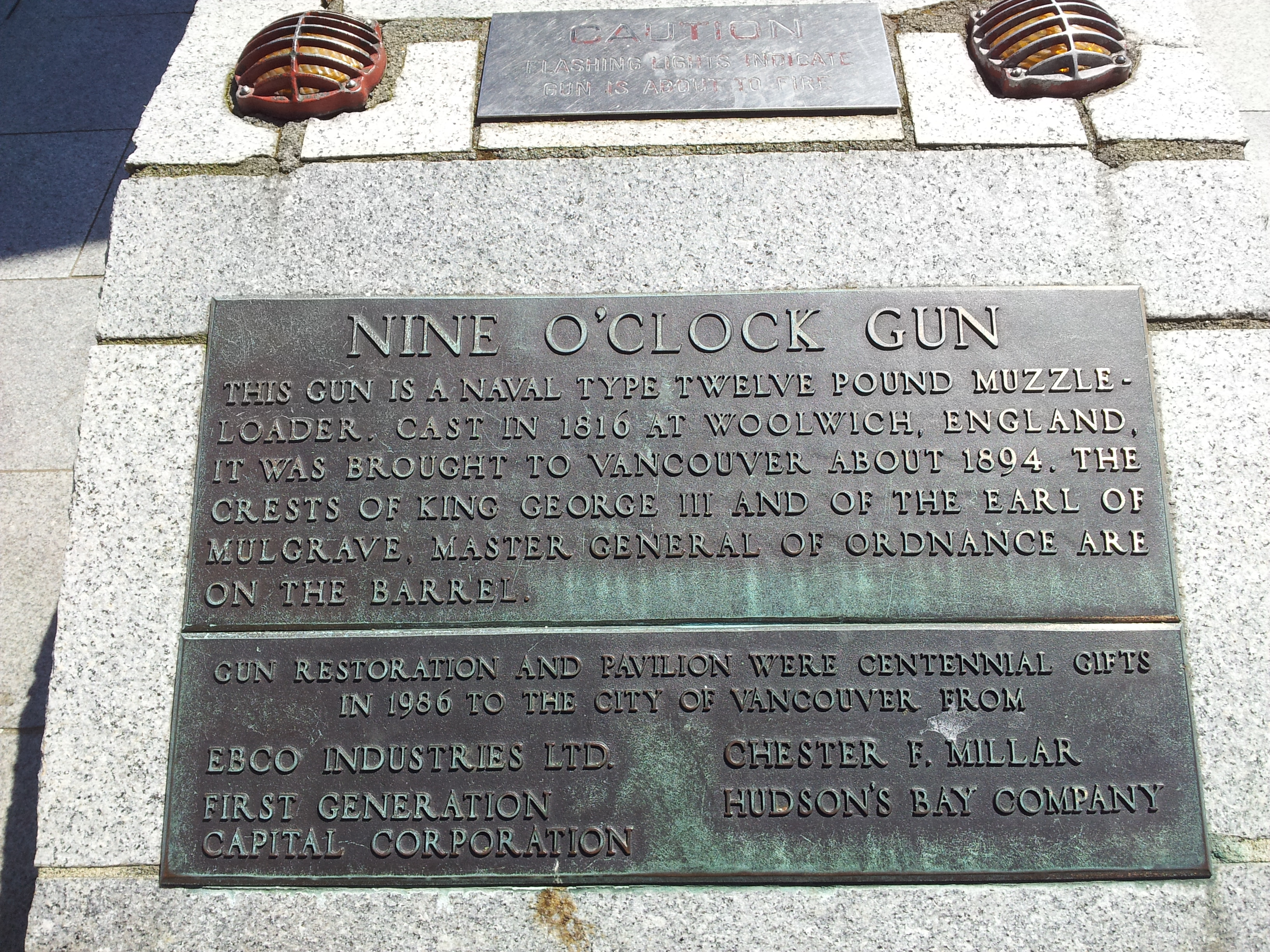
Plaque at the 9 O'Clock Gun.

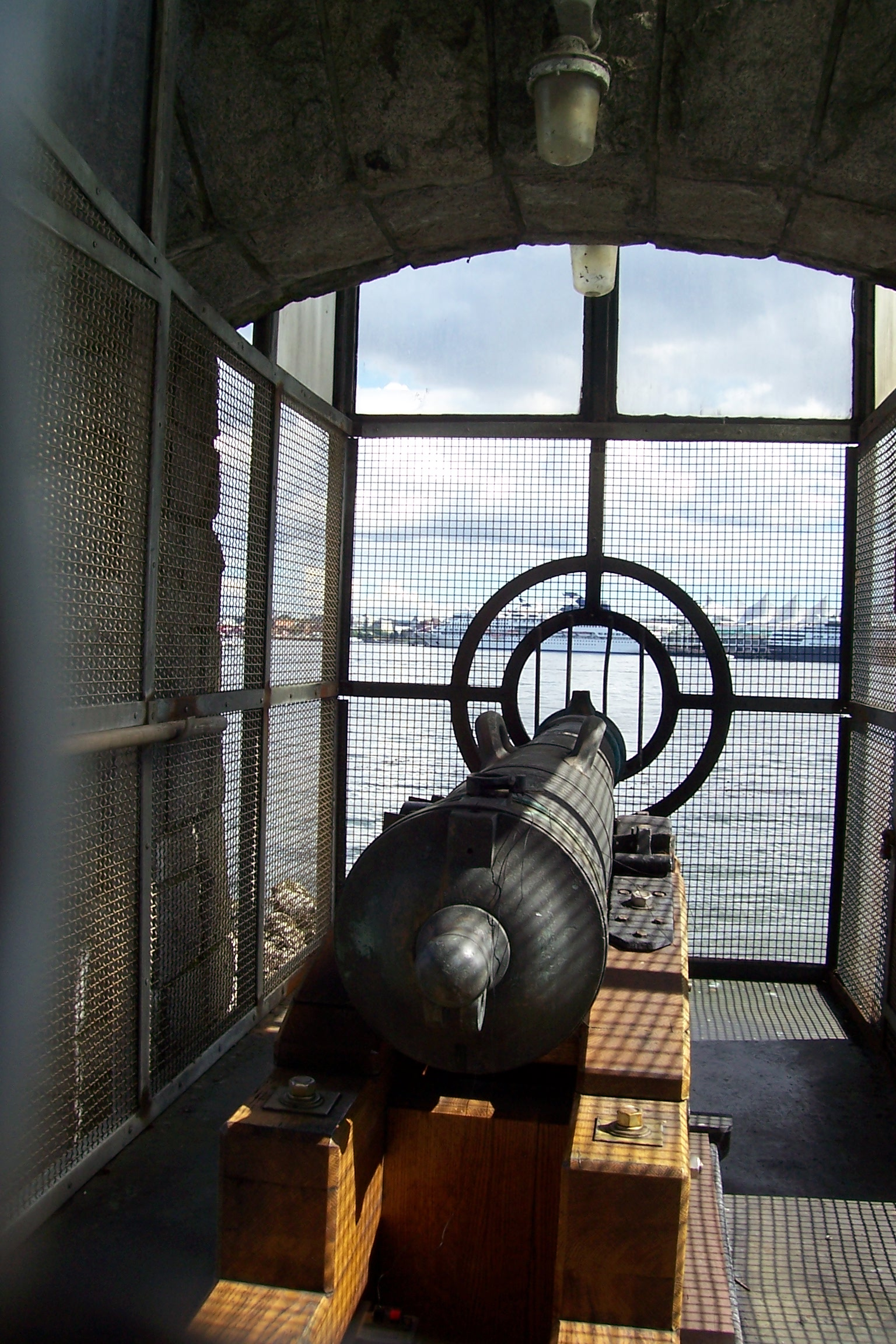
A closer view of the gun.

The 9 O'Clock Gun is a cannon located in Vancouver, British Columbia, Canada, that is ordinarily fired daily at 21:00 (9 p.m.) PT.

== Details ==
The gun is a 12-pound muzzle-loaded naval cannon, cast in Woolwich, England in 1816. The monograms (erroneously referred to as "crests" on the plaque) of King George III and Henry Phipps, 1st Earl of Mulgrave, Master-General of the Ordnance at the time the cannon was cast, are on the barrel. Seventy-eight years later, in about 1894, it was brought to Stanley Park by the Department of Marine and Fisheries to warn fishermen of the 18:00 Sunday close of fishing. On October 15, 1898, the gun was fired for the first time in Stanley Park at noon.

The 21:00 firing was later established as a time signal for the general population and to allow the chronometers of ships in port to be accurately set. The Brockton Point lighthouse keeper, William D. Jones, originally detonated a stick of dynamite over the water until the cannon was installed. The cannon is now activated automatically with an electronic trigger which was installed by the Parks Board electrical department. It is still loaded daily with a black powder charge. The fluorescent lights illuminating the gun from overhead go out exactly ten seconds before it fires, and turn back on a few seconds afterward.

The gun was restored and sheltered by a new pavilion designed by architect Gregory Henriquez in 1986 and built as a centennial gift to the city from Ebco Industries, Chester Millar, First Generation Capital, and the Hudson's Bay Company.

In the past, there was a Texaco floating gas station permanently anchored in line with the gun. On Monday May 18, 1964, someone was able to toss rocks from the beach below into the barrel which then perforated the 'O' in the large illuminated sign above the barge. The barge was moved slightly after that event.

== Timings ==
The clock used to time the firing of the gun runs slightly fast, such that towards the end of each year, the gun fires up to 50 seconds before 9pm. At New Year's Day, the clock seems to be reset, and the gun goes off at 9pm again.

The 9 O'Clock Gun has been silent for several periods: once during World War II, in 1969 when it was stolen and held by University of British Columbia Engineering students until a "ransom" was donated to BC Children's Hospital, in 2007 during a work stoppage, in 2008 when UBC Engineering students painted it red, and on 20 May 2011, 22 July 2017, 26 July 2017, 8 August 2019, 7 October 2019, 17 November 2019, 26 November 2019 and 1 January 2021 with no explanation. After the 1969 theft, the cannon was surrounded by a stone and metal enclosure as shown in the photo.

From 30 March to 30 April 2020, the gun was set to fire at 19:00 (7 p.m.), in support of local health care workers during the COVID-19 pandemic. However, the 9 O'Clock Gun continued to be fired at 7 p.m. until 31 July 2020, when it was switched back to its eponymous 9pm time.

From 4 October 2020, the cannon started firing at 10pm. This is likely due to its clock incorrectly being moved back an hour; a month earlier than PDT actually ends.

The gun did not fire on 19 May 2021, and on 10 July 2021. The cannon did not fire for several days in October, 2021 due to damage to the structure.

Most recently, the gun has gone silent due to gunpowder shortages - from 11 February to 27 February 2022 and from 3 January to 10 January 2023.

== See also ==
- Gastown Steam Clock
- Heritage Horns
- Noonday Gun (Hong Kong)
- Noon Gun (Cape Town)
- Time signal
