= Robert Burns Memorial, Stanley Park =

Memorial and statue in Vancouver, British Columbia, Canada

Robert Burns Memorial
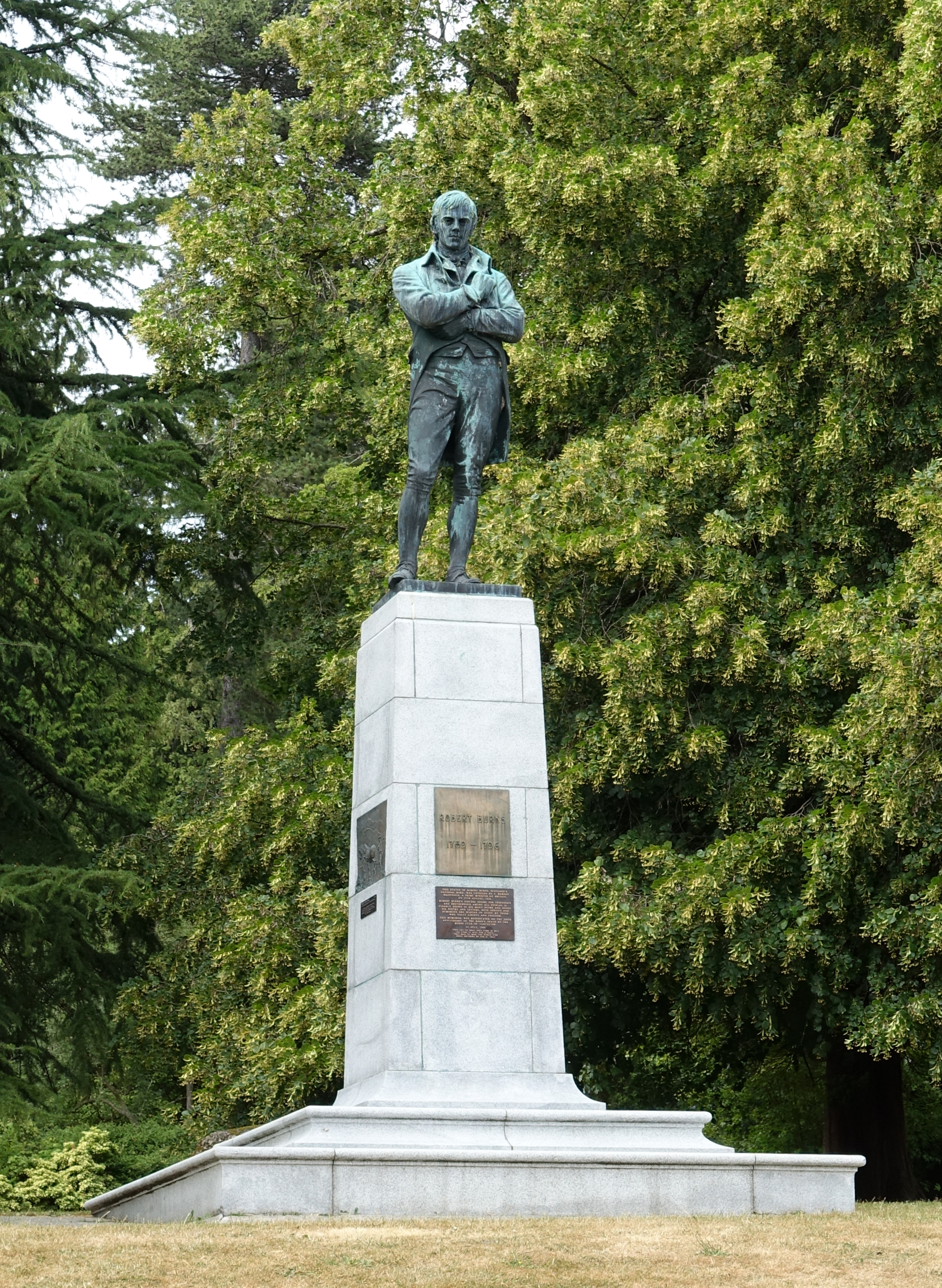
- The memorial in 2015
- Artist: George Anderson Lawson
- Year: 1928
- Location: Vancouver, British Columbia, Canada; 49°17′50″N 123°08′05″W

The Robert Burns Memorial is an outdoor memorial and statue of Scottish poet Robert Burns, located in Stanley Park in Vancouver, British Columbia, Canada.

== Description ==
The statue stands on a tall, light-coloured stone plinth. It is located at the southern approach to the park near Coal Harbour, with Burns facing towards the southern entrance. There is a plaque on the front with his name, followed by reliefs of scenes from his poems "To a Mountain Daisy" (1786), "The Cotter's Saturday Night" (1785), and "Tam O'Shanter" (1790).

== History ==
The sculpture was dedicated on August 25, 1928, and was the first statue erected in Vancouver.

== See also ==
- 1928 in art
- List of Robert Burns memorials
