= Prospect Point (British Columbia) =

Coordinates: 49°18′51″N 123°08′29″W

Prospect Point is a point at the northern tip of Stanley Park in Vancouver, British Columbia, Canada, located on the south side of the First Narrows of Burrard Inlet. The point, which as its name suggests, is a viewpoint, landmark and tourist attraction in Stanley Park and has a restaurant and other facilities, is just west of the Lions Gate Bridge.

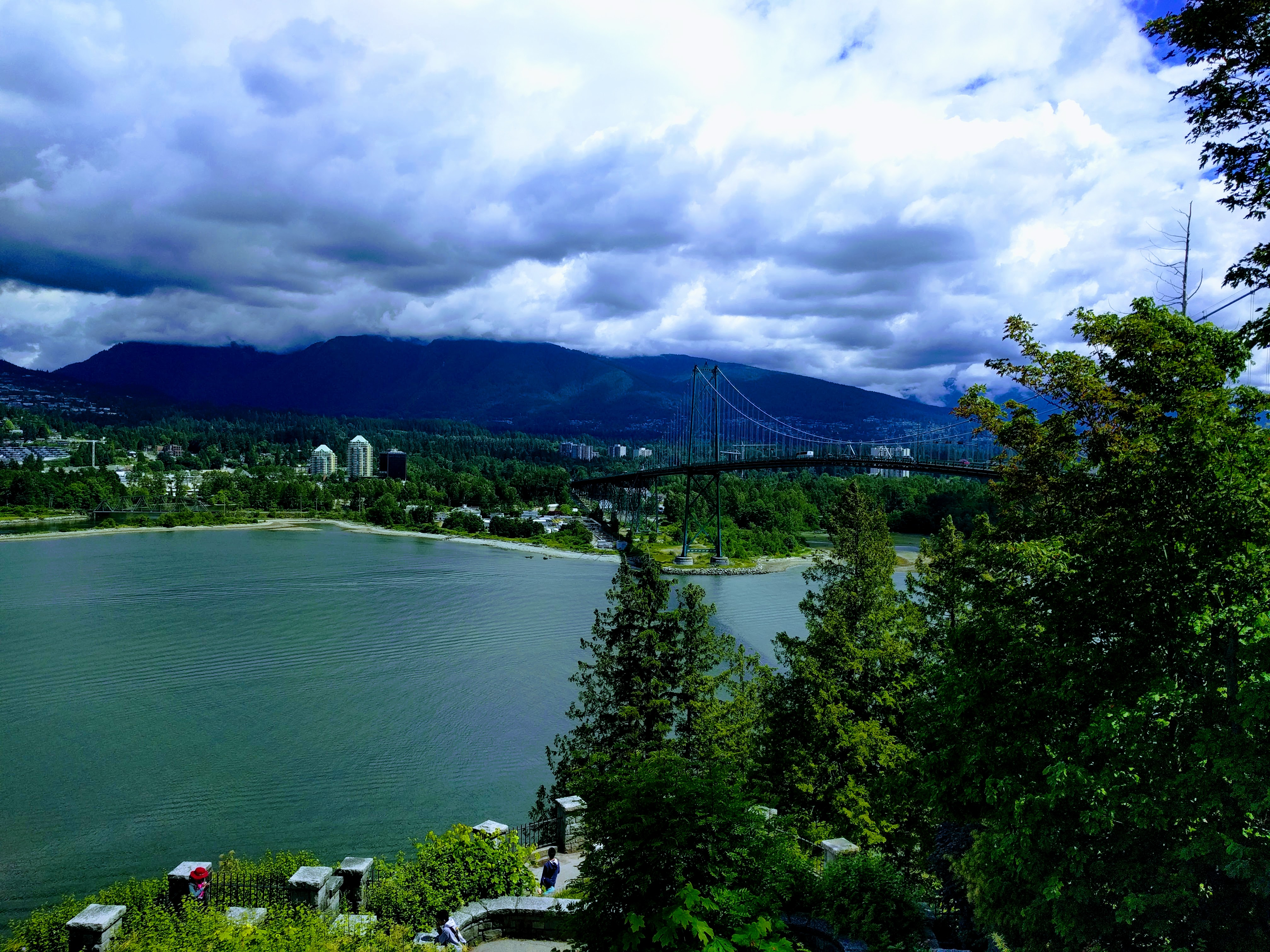
Looking northeast from Prospect Point Viewpoint

The location of the point is known in the Skwxwu7mesh (Squamish) language as Chay-thoos, meaning "high bank". According to Pauline Johnson's account in Legends of Vancouver, in Skwxwu7mesh tradition inside the cliffs that mark the point from the water lived a spirit-being with the power to bring storms and rain.
