= Hollow Tree =

Tree stump in Stanley Park, Vancouver, Canada

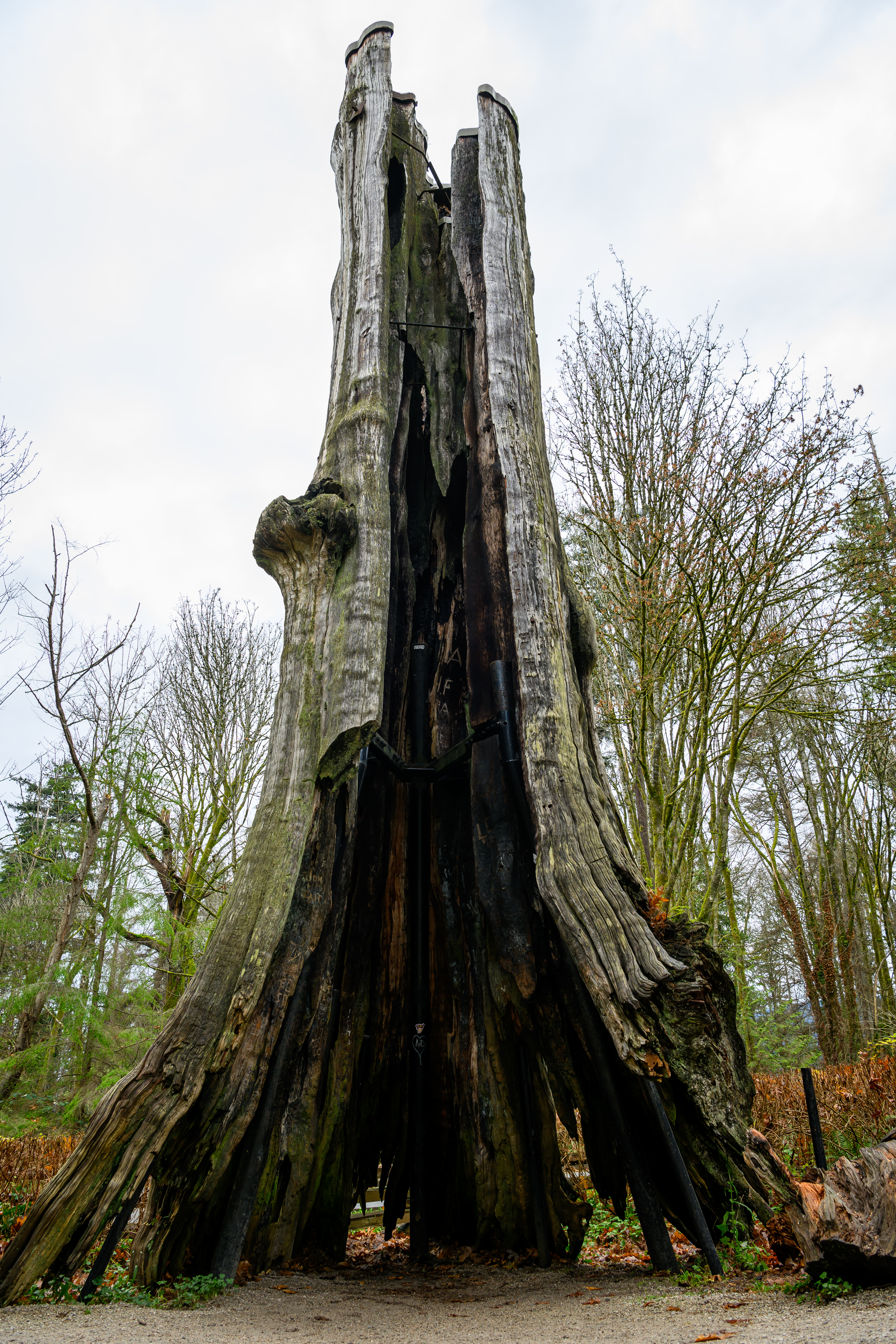
- The tree in 2024

- Location within Greater Vancouver Regional District
- Species: Western redcedar (Thuja plicata)
- Location: Vancouver, British Columbia
- Coordinates: 49.306914°N 123.153613°W

Hollow Tree is a Western red cedar tree stump and a popular landmark in Stanley Park in Vancouver, British Columbia.

== History ==
The tree was damaged during a December 2006 windstorm and was slated for removal. In 2009, the Stanley Park Hollow Tree Conservation Society was formed and began raising money from private donors to preserve the landmark. A metal frame was installed within the tree to hold the structure in place. A ceremony for the restored tree was held in October 2011.

Two "suspicious" fires were put out by firefighters in September 2014.

== Gallery ==
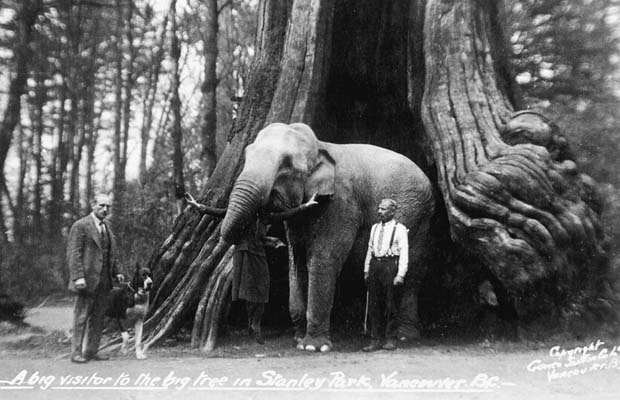
An undated photo from Frank Gowen's Vancouver, 1914–1931, showing an elephant lifting a woman with its trunk, standing inside the tree

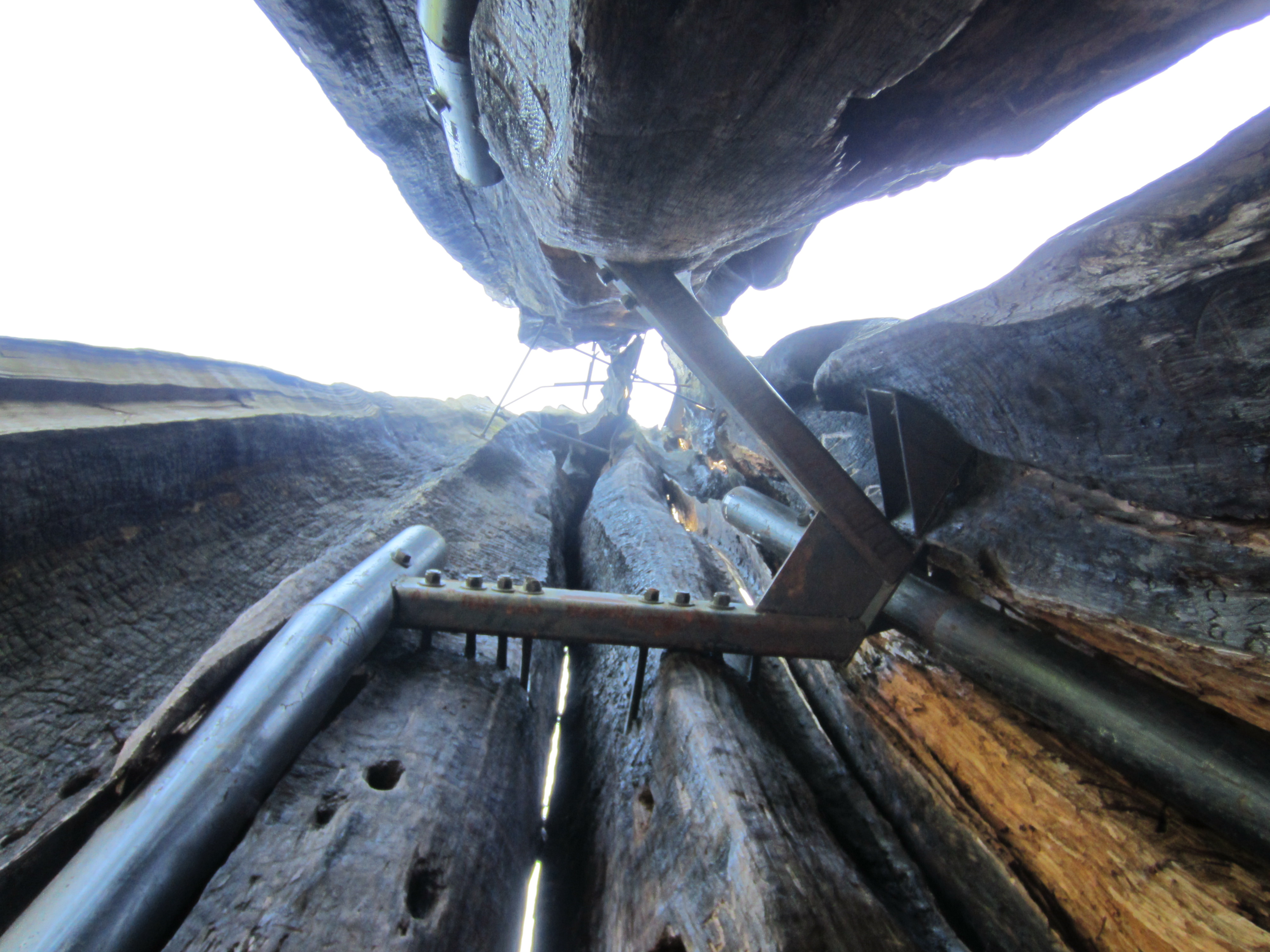
Interior of the tree, showing the supporting metal frame

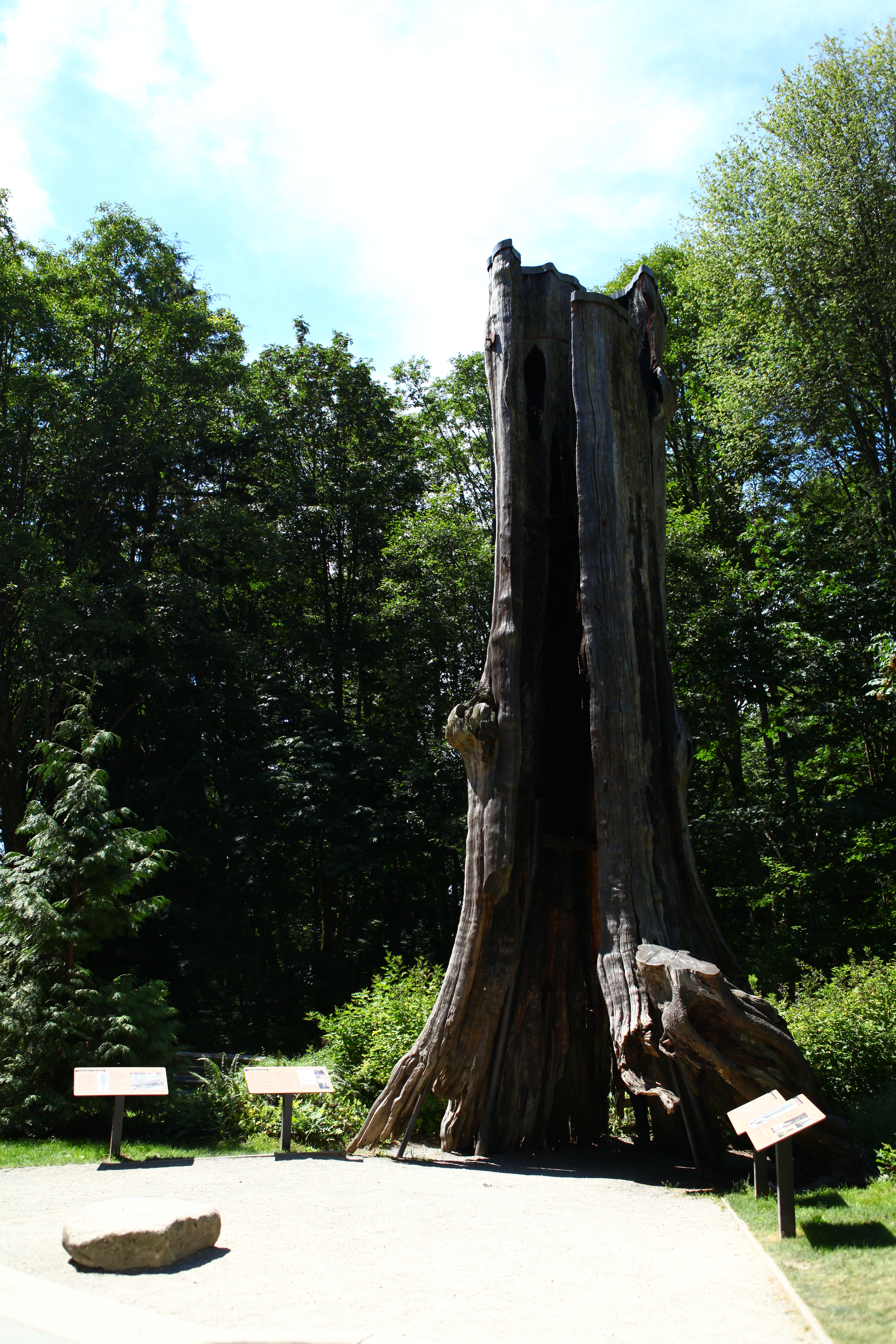
The tree in 2014

== See also ==
- List of individual trees
