= Squamish culture =

Culture of the Squamish people of British Columbia, Canada

Squamish culture is the customs, arts, music, lifestyle, food, painting and sculpture, moral systems and social institutions of the Squamish indigenous people, located in the southwestern part of British Columbia, Canada. They refer to themselves as Sḵwx̱wú7mesh ([sqʷχʷúʔməʃ]). They are a part of the Coast Salish cultural group. Their culture and social life is based on the abundant natural resource of the Pacific Northwest coast, rich in cedar trees, salmon, and other resources. They have complex kinship ties that connect their social life and cultural events to different families and neighboring nations.

== Historical and cultural context ==
An important distinction is to be made about Sḵwxwú7mesh culture. With the history of colonization and assimilation strategies. Sḵwxwú7mesh culture has been drastically changed from their pre-European contact. Despite these attempts, their culture remains intact and thriving. Some cultural practices and customs are not done in the same fashion, but still occur. These could be things like the construction of cedar bark clothing; modern clothes are worn just like the rest of Canadian society, but the art of cedar bark weaving is still passed on and cedar bark clothing is still made. While the practices of the Sḵwxwú7mesh have changed, many still continue, some the same as before, and some only slightly changed.

== Architecture and dwellings ==
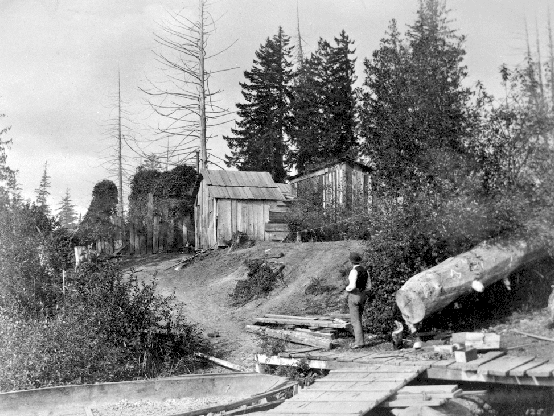
Sḵwx̱wú7mesh longhouses once located in 1886 at Coal Harbour

There architecture in traditional homes is similar to Coast Salish style dwellings called a "longhouse". The housing structures are made from cedar planks, posts, and ties. Historically extended families would live in a longhouse, with different branches of the kinship living in different quarters of the house. Larger houses would have been built to accommodate and host large amounts of guests in ceremonies, festivals, or potlatching. Typical sizes would be around 30 feet wide, 40 feet long and from 19 to 13 feet high.

The house posts on one side would stand slightly taller than the other, giving the roof a small pitch or shed look. Within the house, these house posts would be carved into figures of ancestors depicting legendary events or other family history such as family rights in fishing, hunting, or gathering. Beams crossed the house posts, where wood planks would sit to create the roof. Within the house, wooden platforms formed along the walls holding families living and sleeping quarters. With this architectural style, houses could be built onto each other end to end extending the length of the longhouse. This gave rise to the term "longhouse".

Different types of homes once existed in a typical village, depending on size. Some villages house a few or handful of houses, where others operated with dozens of houses, all homes to many different families. The larger longhouses were used for large potlatches or gatherings, and other longhouses were used exclusively for spiritual ceremonialism. These are Potlatch Houses or tl'e7enkáẃtxw. In the old village of X̱wáýx̱way, a large longhouse was measured at 200 feet long by 60 feet wide where 11 families lived in the house, numbering around 100 people. In 1875, over a thousand people were invited by Supple Jack to be a part of a large potlatch. Another large longhouse was at Chi'ch'elxwikw', measuring 50 feet by 20 feet.

These dwelling, holding spiritual and cultural significance are still used for traditional gatherings and ceremonies. The architectural style has also been incorporated into modern buildings in the communities.

== Ceremonies and events ==
In Sḵwx̱wú7mesh culture, ceremonies, events and festivals were the highly of community life. Ranging from community gathers in feasts, to spiritual endeavours in ceremony, these events were a big part of the culture. The most studied and practiced event was the potlatch. A Sḵwxwú7mesh potlatch differed quite differently from the Northern tribes and their festivities. In a Sḵwxwú7mesh potlatch, a large feast is held and the community, nation, or neighboring nations are invited to partake. Highly wealthy families and individuals host these potlatch for different events taking place, and to distribute the resources and wealth accumulated. A potlatch would usually occur around events such as birth, coming of age, naming ceremony, marriage, or memorial event for the deceased. It is in the winter months that most potlatching take places, where historically summer was used for traveling and harvesting.

=== Potlatch ===
At a potlatch, in Squamish language a tl'e7enk, the host would invite guests to feast in foods prepared and harvested. Blankets would be bought or made, then distributed to guests. At the events, the host would hire a speaker to speak for the family in the proceedings. For special potlatches, a special platform would be constructed, around 10 or 15 feet high, 5 feet wide, where the host and his speaker would pile a number of blankets, either bought or made by the host's own family, and distribute the blankets to the guests. The speaker would call out names of guests, usually highly respected or high ranking, taking a blanket and throwing it out for that guest. Typically a crowd would amass below, ready for the falling blankets, waiting for it to fall. While the blanket came down, the other guests would have knives and spears ready to tear apart the blanket. Thus, the blanket would be torn and split up into multiple pieces. After attending a few potlatches, the guests would procure enough wool to construct their own blanket. "Hundred Dollar Charlie", maternal grandfather to Andy Paull, reportedly gave the last potlatch on Burrard Inlet before the practice was banned by the Canadian government in 1885.

In other ceremonies, a young woman, sometimes the daughter of a highly respected man, would be placed on top of a mound of blankets. This mound would match her height. Sitting on top of the blankets, a ceremony would take place around here, while she sat on top of and her family nearby. During some ceremonies, people situated around the house would take wooden batons and beat on plank drums situated through the house. When a young girl would stand up, she would dance around the house with a shawl on, and everyone else would beat and sing. When she was done, one man would take down, from duck, swan, or eagle, and sprinkle it over her.

For large festivities, a bigger house then the normal dwelling would be built. These are potlatch houses or tl'e7enkáẃtxw. One longhouse was measured at 200 feet long by 60 feet wide. These houses could hold over a thousand guests, invited from far along the coast. The house would be decorated with down, sprinkled throughout the floor of the house. The longhouse in Xwemelch'stn is one of these types of houses. One potlatch was recorded at Xwáýxway in 1875. In the longhouse, a large cedar slab dwelling, a large ceremony with guests of people from nearby nations, Vancouver Island, and the Interior British Columbia. This potlatch was hosted by August Jack's father, named Supple Jack.

=== Puberty and rites of passage ===
The stage of life that brought much change was filled with much attention and celebration. Young men and women may follow some of the same customs, but differ on certain specifics. The difference in their training had to do with what positions they would be taking in the community, the fact that different families had different protocols, or other factors.

At the sign of reaching this point in a young girl's life, she would inform her mother, and she would inform the father. The father would call together the family and relatives. They would then discuss what arrangements and course they would follow. Different families had different teachings or traditions, and as such, each girl may have had different customs. In one example of the tradition, the family would take two strands of mountain goat wool, and tie them to each side of the girl's forehead. The community would see this signifier of her new womanhood, announcing to her people that she is of age.

For four days, she would fast with no food and limited or no water. During this time, she would refrain from bathing and being near fires. It was believed if she was to go near the fire, her skin would become red. The women of her family, like her mother, grandmother or other women, would pull out the irregular hairs from the edges of her eyebrows to make them fine and beautiful. The edges were rubbed with the girl's saliva and a plant mixture to stop hairs from growing again. After the four days, the same woman would bathe and scrub her.

The purpose of these traditions were to make her "bright and smart". Following the bathing, she would be given food and could then sit near the fire. When applicable, a family member would drape a blanket over the woman's shoulders. After the meal, she would be painted with red ochre. She would travel to the forest and pull down cedar and spruce tree branches, rubbing the ends of these over her face and body. This would to make her beautiful and charming in the eyes of men. She would give offerings of fern roots to those cedar trees.

After all these things were conducted, she would be given an ancestral name, and the naming ceremony or potlatch would occur.

=== Naming ===
Naming customs are ancestral or hereditary naming. Within the traditional customs, when a child is born the elders of the child's family or community would choose a name. This is called a ninamin or nicknam used to name children. Years later while going through puberty or "coming-of-age" rituals, the person would receive a name from a deceased ancestor. These ancestral names can then be traced back many generations. The names are thus considered "property", in belonging to a family. These ancestral names are called "kweshamin". The family would host a potlatch and bestow the new ancestral name on the person. Within present practices, ancestral names are still passed on, but mostly when a family makes the preparations to host a potlatch and not just when a child begins puberty.

Every name has a suffix ending, denoting masculine or feminine names, and sometimes having actual translations to their meaning. One example is the -lanexw ending. This is found in names like "Kiyapalanexw" which when Anglicized became "Capilano", "Xatsalanxw" which when Anglicized became "Kitsilano", and many other names.

=== Marriage ===
After a young boy or girl went through the proper "coming-of-age" rituals, or had reached puberty, they were ready to become adults. For young people around this age, marriage would be a priority. A young man would search out a prospective bride from another village or sometimes a neighboring nation. He would travel to the house of the prospective bride, sit outside the doorway with a blanket wrapped around him, and wait. He would wait here, not eating any foods or drinking any liquids during this time, usually lasting up to 4 days. While this occurred, the girl's family would take no notice of him. If acceptable to the parents, the mother of the prospective wife would approach a neighbor to inform the young man that the girl's parents are willing to accept him as their son-in-law.

Neither the girl's family nor the young suitor would have any communication with each other. The neighbor would prepare and give a meal to the fasting man. He would then return home to his village and family to inform them of his acceptance. He would return days later with family and friends in canoes. If of lower ranking, he would return with one canoe load of blankets, but if of higher ranking, he would come with many canoe loads of gifts, blankets, and animal skins. All of these gifts would be distributed to the bride's family. Sometimes, the young man was not accepted by the young woman's family. A family council would be held to discuss the issue, and the young man might be rejected. A neighbor would be called upon to be an intermediary and inform him he is not invited into the house and to return home.

During the night, the father-in-law would entertain the groom's family, and offer accommodation to them, with the host family sleeping on one side of the longhouse, and the groom's family living on the other. In the proceeding morning, both families would walk down to the beach front where the groom's canoe is moored. Here the bride's family placed blankets in the canoe. If the bride was of high rank or nobility, blankets would be lined up on the ground from the house to the canoe for the bride to walk on, while two older women led her down. The bride would be dressed in beautiful regalia in colours and ornaments. Over her head another blanket was placed, somewhat like a veil. Behind her would be carried personal belongings, such as things like mats, baskets, blankets, wooden platters, and spoons.

The older women then placed the bride on the bow of the canoe, and for their services the groom thanked them with gifts or blankets. The bride's family and friends then returned to their home, while the young groom and his family returned to his village with the bride. If the family were not of nobility, most of these customs would not occur.

After some days, the bride and groom would return to the woman's village with the father-of-the-bride hosting a feast for his guests. After this feast, the married couple and family returned to their home. Many days later, the bride's family traveled to the groom's village. They would bring gifts and blankets equal the number given to them. They distributed this all to the groom's friends and family, and celebrated with a large potlatch. During the potlatch, the bride would be placed on top of many blankets piled high, and would sit there during the ceremonies and speeches. Gifts would be given away, and the family and village would celebrate. After all these, the marriage ceremonies would end and the man and woman were regarded as husband and wife.

== Games and sports ==
Sḵwxwú7mesh daily life included an array of games and sports. One of the most well known games played was the bone game or slahal. This was played with two opposing teams. There were two sets of "bones", and two sets of sticks, numbering from 7-11 for each team. When a game was in play, one team had two sets of "bones". When your team was guessing, your objective was to get the right bone, the one without the stripe. When you had the bones, your objective was to make sure the other team guessed wrong on the bones set. When the other team guessed wrong, you gained a point. When a team had the two sets of bones, two individuals hid the bones and swapped them around from hand to hand. Eventually the bones were brought forward, but were concealed as to show the other team which one had a stripe on it. The game was usually accompanied by drumming and singing, used to boost the morale of the team. The side that had the bone sings, while the other tried to guess. Musical accompaniment was also sometimes used to taunt the other team. Gambling could be done by players, or spectators of a match. Placing bets on teams, or individual matches within the game between one guess and the other teams bone hiders.

Other games included some played by children, and some played specifically by the warriors to prepare and train themselves. Some sports are similar to modern-day lacrosse, rugby, and soccer.

The Sḵwxwú7mesh game called tk'7kw'ala, similar to lacrosse, was played in villages. A smooth oval stone weighing about three pounds, would be used by teams of two, around six on each team. There were no sticks or nets on open spaces. The goal posts were six feet apart on each side of an open space.

In the last few decades, canoe racing has become popular among Coast Salish peoples. It's done with specifically designed war canoes or racing canoes. They are based on the more traditional canoe styles, but have quite a modern design. The canoe is usually a foot or two above water level, with enough width for one man. Different races include single, double, or 11-man races. The races are held in the summertime.

== Language ==
The Squamish language, or Sḵwxwú7mesh language, is the ancestral language of the Sḵwx̱wú7mesh people. It is considered an important part of cultural revitalization. Although nearing language extinction, it's still used in ceremonies, events, and basic conversation among some. With the language dead (no children are learning it as a first language and all language speakers are over the age of 65), much work is being done to preserve and revitalize it. The language is part the Coast Salish linguistic group, and is most closely related to Sháshíshálh (Sechelt), and Sḵ'emin'em (Halkomelem) and Xwsa7km (Lhéchalosem). Many anthropologists and linguists have worked with Sḵwxwú7mesh people and their language, including Franz Boas, Charles Hill-Tout, Homer Barnett, and Aert J. Kuipers.

Since the late 1800s the language has had a history. Before contact, it was the prominent language of all the villages, along with the Chinook Jargon. Most children would learn Chinook as a first language because it was so basic, then Sḵwxwú7mesh language as they became older. After the spread of diseases causing massive population drops and colonizations of their territory, Chinook became a minority language in their lands. When the Canadian government enforced assimilationist policies regarding their culture and language, a residential school was set up in the village of Eslha7an with children coming from many Skwxwu7mesh villages, plus some church officials sending children to another school in Sechelt. The school, a home for many children 10 months out of the year, were forbade to speak their language. Any children speaking the language were punished and beaten. This cause a deep resentment about speaking the language, and so the next generation grew up without any knowledge of their native tongue.

Over the years, English became the prominent language. Then during the 1960s, a great deal of documentation and work helped in its revitalization. The BC Language Project with Randy Bouchard and Dorothy Kennedy undertook more documentation and were the main collaborators on this project. They devised the present writing system that is used for the Sḵwxwú7mesh language. Eventually a local elementary school and high school included language classes, as opposed to the normal French language option. Xwemelch'stn Estimxwataxw School, meaning Xwmelch'stn Littleones School, with grades Kindergarten to 3, was built to assist in language immersion, with plans to expand it into a full immersion school.

== Art ==
=== Visual ===
Visuals include, Totem poles, Canoes, blankets, and baskets.

=== Weaving ===
Baskets, hats, as well as raincoats made from the inside bark of Cedar trees.

== Transportation ==
Being a coastal people, the Sḵwxwú7mesh historically travelled either by foot or by canoe. Different styles of canoe existed for different types of water. Seagoing canoes, typically larger, were used on the open ocean. Smaller inlet-style canoes were used in calmer waters and shorter travel to nearby villages or neighboring people. Cargo canoes were also made for trading large amounts of goods. The main way or transportation was through canoe pulling. Intricate paths and trails were developed to trade with interior nations more inland.

== Bibliography ==
- Barman, Jean (2007) [2005]. Stanley Park's Secret: The Forgotten Families of Whoi Whoi, Kanaka Ranch and Brockton Point. Madeira Park, BC: Harbour Publishing. ISBN 978-1-55017-420-5.
- Matthews, Major J. S. (1955). Conversations with Khahtsahlano 1932–1954. ASIN B0007K39O2.
- Clark, Ella E. Indian Legends of the Pacific Northwest. University of California Press, 2003. ISBN 0-520-23926-1.
- Hill-tout, Charles. "Salish People: Volume II: the Squamish and the Lillooet". Talonbooks, 1978. ISBN 0-88922-149-9.
- Khatsahlano, August Jack and Charlie, Domenic. Squamish Legends: The First People. Oliver N. Wells, June 1966.
- Kolstee, Anton. The Eagle School student dictionary of Squamish language. Carson Graham Secondary School, October 1993.
- Kuipers, H. Alert. The Squamish language: Grammar, texts, dictionary. Mouton & Co., 1967.
