= Kitsilano Trestle =

Former rail bridge in Vancouver, British Columbia

The Kitsilano Trestle (also known as CPR trestle and CPR Kitsilano trestle) was a former railway bridge over False Creek, in Vancouver, British Columbia, Canada.

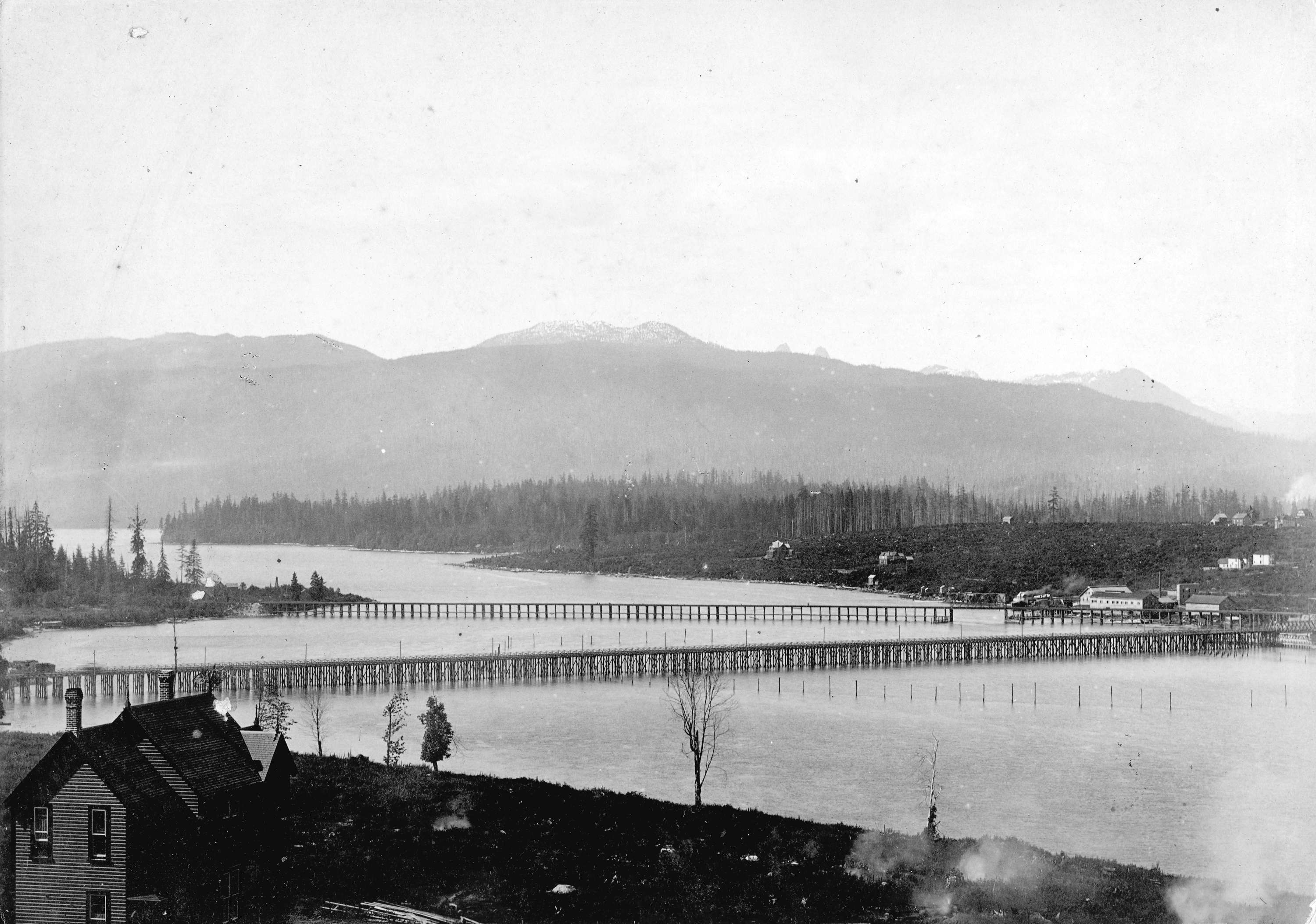
The first trestle in the foreground in 1890, with the early Granville Street Bridge behind

The first bridge, a timber trestle was begun in 1886 or 1888 to carry the Canadian Pacific Railway (CPR) to a proposed port on English Bay on the Kitsilano side, south of the Indian Reservation. It connected to more CPR lines on the south side, including the Arbutus Corridor to Richmond, purchased from the CPR in 2016 after a lawsuit decided by the Supreme Court of Canada.

However, due to the railway's decision to locate its depot and yards on the north side of False Creek (modern-day Yaletown) meant that the trestle saw little use until street cars of the B.C. Electric Railway rolled over it 1905.

Being fixed, it blocked the flow of marine traffic into False Creek and was replaced in 1902 with a second bridge with a swinging span.

After World War II, industry began to leave False Creek, meaning the CPR used the Arbutus Corridor less. The second trestle was demolished in 1982, in anticipation of the World's Fair of 1986 (Expo 86). While there were proposals to convert the rail bridge to a pedestrian bridge, city council refused, citing the impaired flow of water into False Creek.

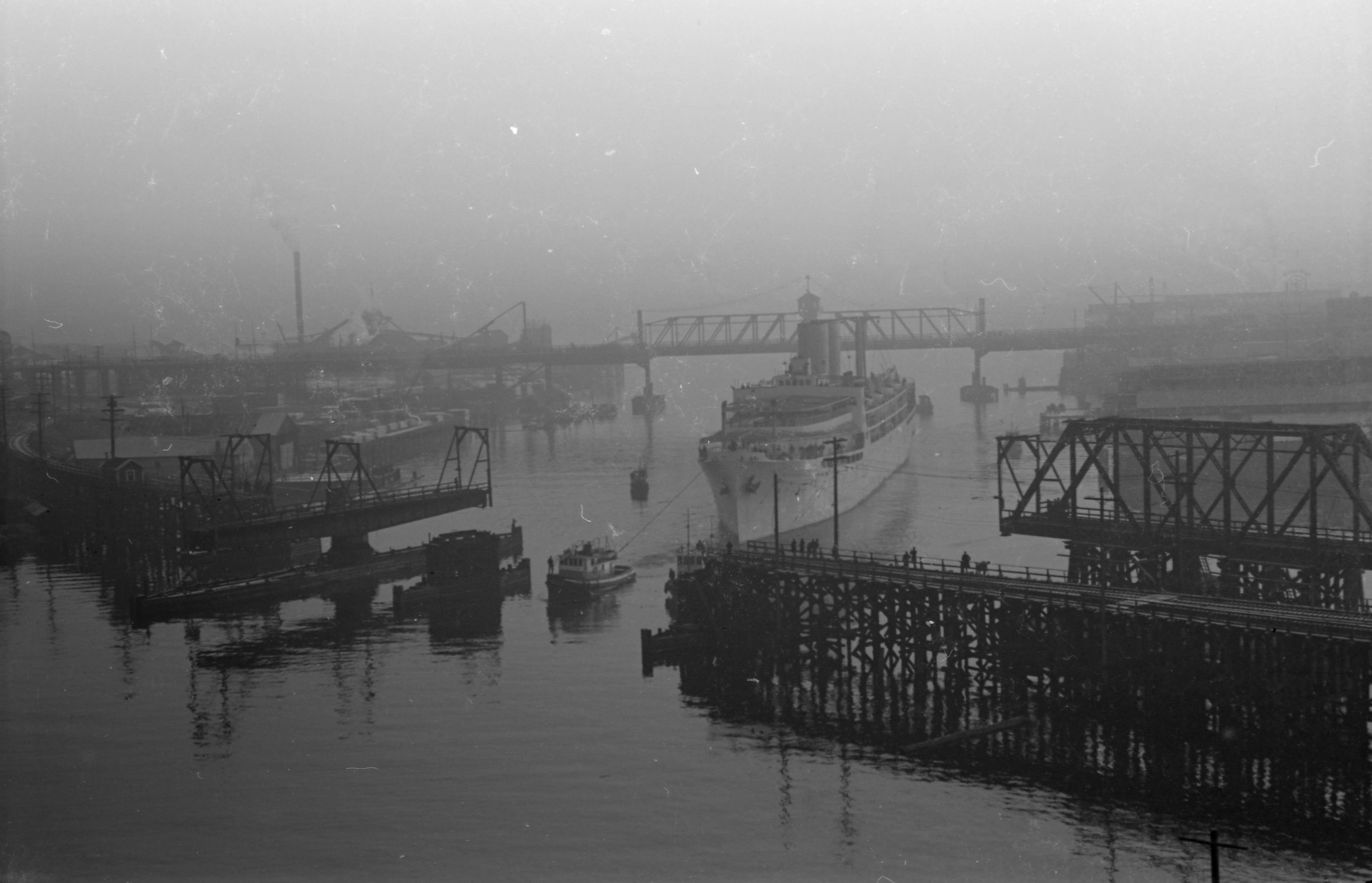
The second trestle at foreground in 1945, in open position allowing ships to pass. The Granville Street Bridge is in the background.

Expo 86 brought a complete redevelopment of the False Creek area, notably due to the influence of Hong Kong entrepreneur Li-Ka Shing and his company Concord Pacific, which transformed the north shore into modern condominiums.

The bridge was pivotal in the development of northeast modern-day Kitsilano, as the trestle provided quick access by streetcar to the inner city.
