= Vancouver & District Inter-High School Football League Senior Championships =

The old varsity high school, Vancouver & District Inter-High School Football League Senior Championships (1934 to 1965) became the Shrine Bowl Provincial Championships (1966 to 1975).

Year	Champion	Year	Champion	Year	Champion
1934	King Edward High School	1945	Kitsilano High School	1956	King Edward & Kitsilano (tie)
1935	Prince of Wales Secondary	1946	Magee Secondary School	1957	King Edward High School
1936	Magee Secondary School	1947	King Edward High School	1958	King Edward High School
1937	King Edward High School	1948	King Edward & King George (tie)	1959	Kitsilano Secondary School
1938	Prince of Wales Secondary	1949	King Edward High School	1960	Kitsilano Secondary School
1939	Kitsilano Secondary School	1950	King Edward & King George (tie)	1961	Kitsilano Secondary School
1940	Magee Secondary School	1951	King Edward High School	1962	Britannia Secondary School
1941	Kitsilano Secondary School	1952	Kitsilano Secondary School	1963	Killarney Secondary School
1942	Kitsilano Secondary School	1953	Kitsilano Secondary School	1964	John Oliver Secondary
1943	Kitsilano Secondary School	1954	Kitsilano Secondary School	1965	Killarney Secondary School
1944	Kitsilano Secondary School	1955	King Edward High School	1966	*start of Shrine Bowl

== Notes ==
The V&D Championship continued to be played between teams in Greater Vancouver after the start of the provincial championship in 1966 until at least 1983.
