= Seaforth Peace Park =

Park in British Columbia, Canada

- Location within Greater Vancouver Regional District
- Type: Park
- Location: Kitsilano, Vancouver, British Columbia
- Coordinates: 49°16′18″N 123°08′46″W
- Created: 1949

Seaforth Peace Park, formerly Seaforth Park, is a park in Vancouver's Kitsilano neighbourhood, in British Columbia, Canada. The park's name refers to the neighboring Seaforth Armoury.

== History ==
The land was originally part of the Kitsilano Indian Reserve. Interest in converting the land to a park began in the 1920s. The property was designated a park by 1949, though no dedication was held.

In July 1986, the Vancouver Park Board approved a fountain memorial to honor victims of the 1945 atomic bombing of Hiroshima. The memorials, which was created by Sam Carter, features a water-filled bronze cauldron on a granite base and an eternal flame.

In 1992, Seaforth Park was renamed Seaforth Peace Park during a ceremony in which local students created a peace grove consisting of twelve Cercidiphyllum (katsura) trees on the south side of the park.
