= Squamish people =

Indigenous people of southwestern British Columbia, Canada

Squamish
Sḵwx̱wú7mesh
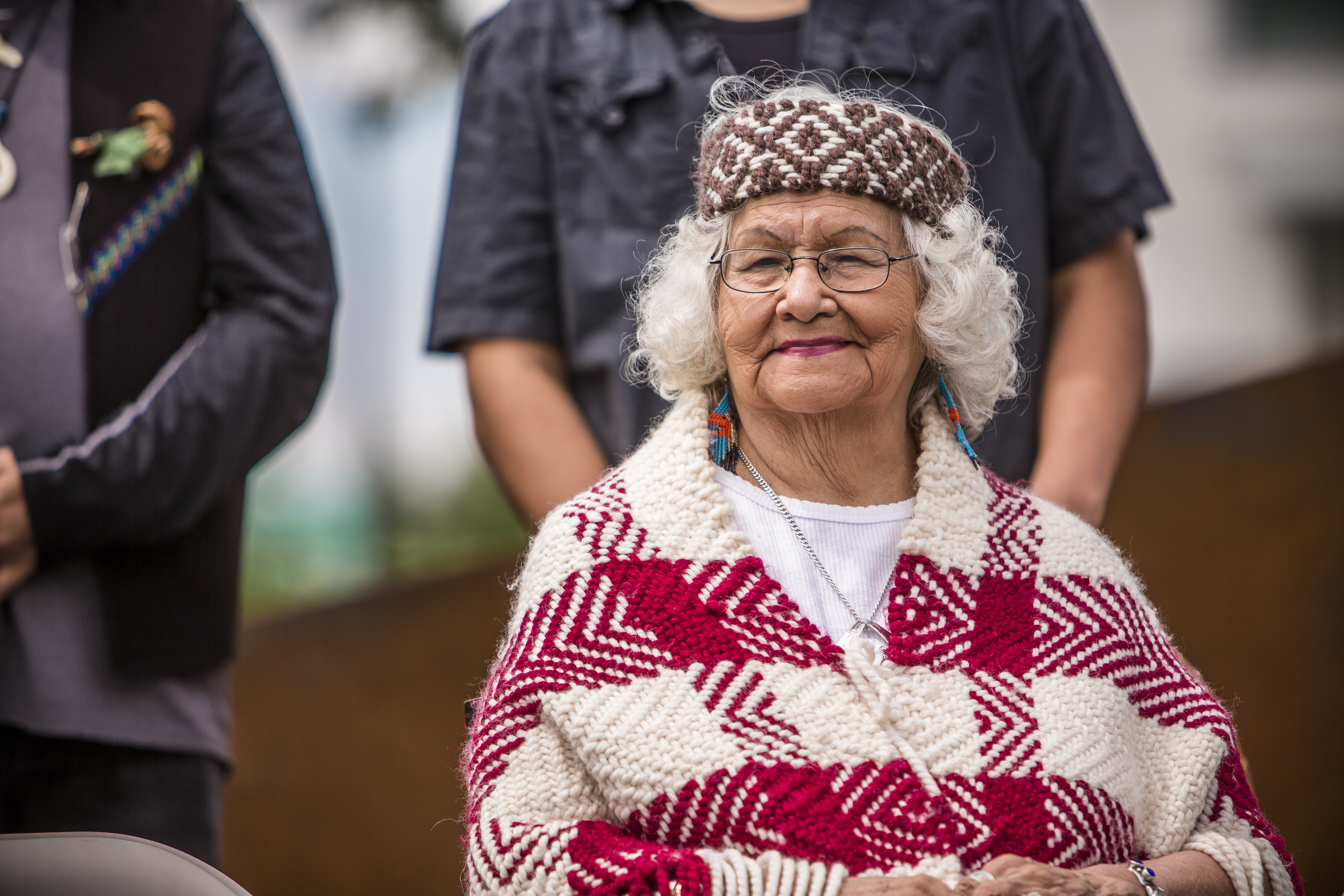
- A Squamish elder, 2019

Total population
- 3,893 enrolled members (2012)

Regions with significant populations
- British Columbia, Canada

Languages
- Squamish, English

Religion
- Indigenous religion, Christianity

Related ethnic groups
- Other Coast Salish groups, incl. Tsleil-Waututh, Musqueam, and Shishalh; Lil'wat

The Squamish people (Squamish: Sḵwx̱wú7mesh, Squamish: [ˈsqʷχʷuː.ʔməʃ], historically transliterated as Sko-ko-mish) are an Indigenous people of the Pacific Northwest Coast. Archaeological evidence shows they have lived in the area for more than a thousand years. In 2012, the Squamish Nation had 3,893 band members.

Their language is the Squamish language or Sḵwx̱wú7mesh sníchim, considered a part of the Coast Salish languages, and is categorized as nearly extinct with just 10 fluent speakers as of 2010.

The traditional territory is within present-day southwestern British Columbia, Canada, and covers Point Grey as the southern border. From there, it extends northward to Roberts Creek on the Sunshine Coast, up the Howe Sound. The northern part includes the Squamish, Cheakamus, Elaho and Mamquam rivers. Up the Cheakamus River it includes land past Whistler, British Columbia. The southern and eastern part of their territory includes Indian Arm, along Burrard Inlet, through False Creek then English Bay and Point Grey. Today the Squamish people live mostly in seven communities, located in West Vancouver, North Vancouver, and within and nearby to the District of Squamish.

The Squamish people's history, culture, societal customs, and other knowledge were historically transmitted by oral tradition from generation to generation without a writing system. Today oral tradition continues to be a fundamental aspect of their traditional culture. This continued until European contact and diseases in 1791, which caused drastic changes to the people and culture. Charles Hill-Tout became the first European to document Squamish oral history in the early 1900s. Later, many anthropologists and linguists came to work with Squamish informants and elders to document Squamish culture and history. Although first recorded contact with Europeans happened with George Vancouver and José María Narváez in 1791–1792, disease had devastated much of the population before in the 1770s. For decades following, more diseases, including influenza, reduced the population significantly. Along with the influx of new foreigners, usurpation of their ancestral lands, and later policies of assimilation by the Canadian government, caused a significant shift in their culture, way of life, and society.

== History ==
=== Oral tradition ===
Oral tradition transmits history, literature, law and other knowledges verbally across generations, without a writing system, and forms the basis for most of the Squamish people's history. The passing on of this history is regarded as the "duty of responsible elders". Those who possessed a great deal of knowledge were regarded as aristocrats. Like other Indigenous peoples of the Pacific Northwest Coast, the Squamish have stories of the "Transformer" brothers who went around the world transforming things and people. Other stories transmitted through generations are of ancestral characters doing things or involved in events. Oral tradition and history, including new events, continues to be passed on in this form to this day.

Squamish oral history traces back to "founding fathers" of their people. An aged informant of the Squamish people named Mel̓ḵw's, said to be over 100 years old, was interviewed by Charles Hill-Tout in 1886. He recited oral history on the origins of the world, and talked about how "water was everywhere". But the tops of the mountains came out of the sea and land was formed. The first man to appear was named "X̱i7lánexw". He was given a wife, an adze, and a salmon trap. X̱i7lánexw and his wife populated the land and the Squamish descend from these ancestors. Dominic Charlie told a similar story in 1965 about the origins of his people.

Their oral history talks about the Great Flood also. In a story said to happen at Chʼiyáḵmesh (Cheakamus), in the Squamish Valley, a man who survived the flood was walking down the river, feeling depressed about the loss of his people from the flood. Then the Thunderbird helped him and gave him food. He continued down the river, with his food gathered by the Thunderbird, when the Thunderbird told him where to stay, and that he would give him a wife. That is where the people of Chʼiyáḵmesh came from. In another story of the first ancestors, two men first appeared at Sch'enḵ and Chekw'élhp, located at what is now known as Gibsons, British Columbia. The first man to appear here was Tseḵanchtn, then the second man appeared named Sx̱eláltn. The people repopulated the land with large families and many Squamish people claim descent from these ancestors.

=== Disease epidemics ===
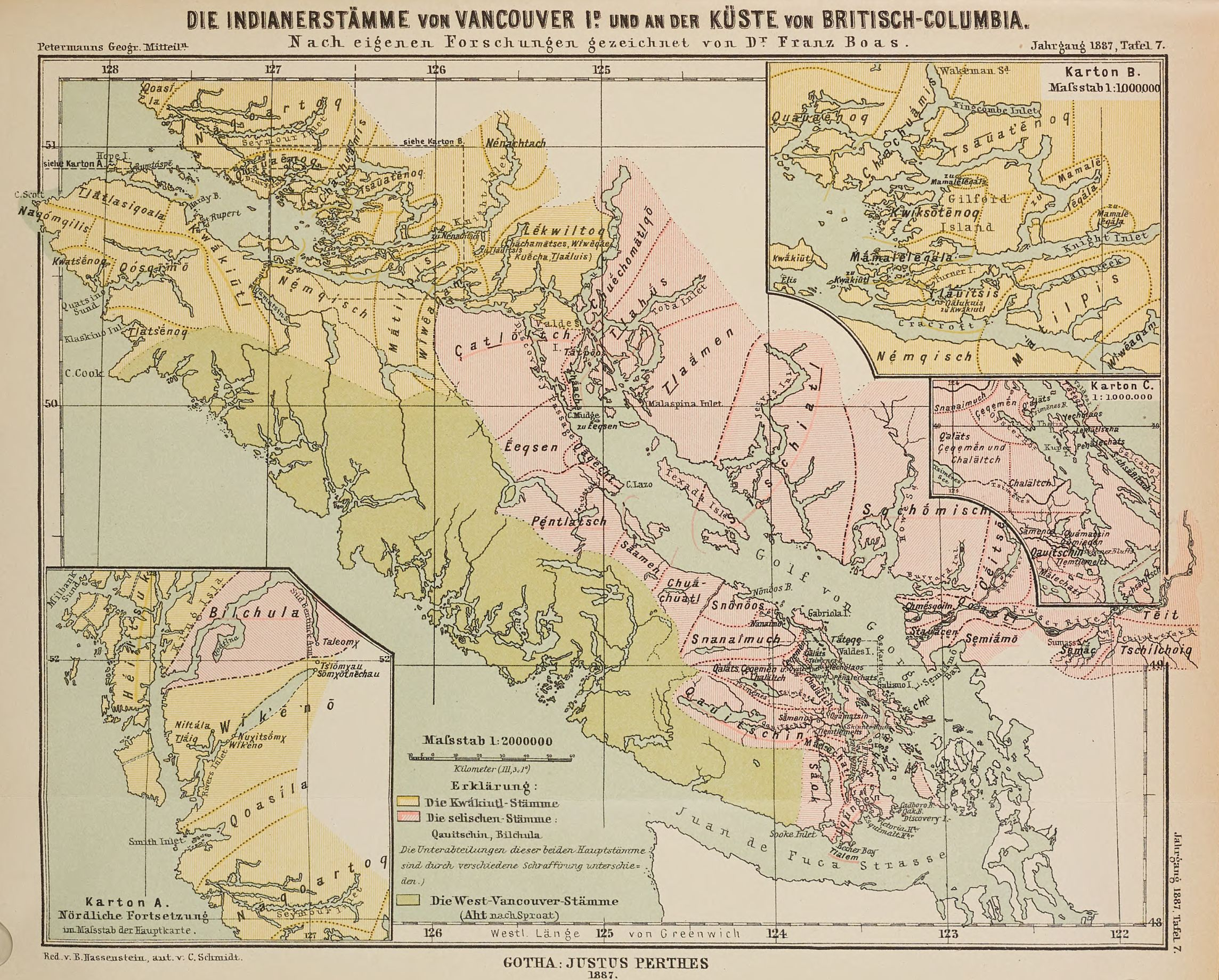
Dr. Franz Boas 1887 map showing Squamish territories

During the 1770s, smallpox (variola major) eradicated at least 30% of the Indigenous population on the Northwest coast of North America, including many Squamish. This disease was one of the most deadly to hit the region over the next 80 to 100 years. During the 80-year period from the 1770 to 1850, smallpox, measles, influenza, and other diseases killed many villages and communities. Surviving oral histories describe the 1770s epidemic. An "aged informant" of the Squamish, in the 1890s, related the history of a catastrophic illness to ethnographer Charles Hill-Tout. Since it is now known that smallpox is only carried by humans, it is unclear whether the connection with the salmon was merely a coincidence, or if perhaps the illness described was not in fact smallpox. Regardless, Hill-Tout wrote:

"[A] dreadful misfortune befell them. … One salmon season the fish were found to be covered with running sores and blotches, which rendered them unfit for food. As the people depended very largely upon these salmon for their winter's food supply, they were obliged to catch and cure them as best they could, and store them away for food. They put off eating them till no other food was available, and then began a terrible time of sickness and distress. A dreadful skin disease, loathsome to look upon, broke out upon all alike. None were spared. Men, women, and children sickened, took the disease and died in agony by hundreds, so that when the spring arrived and fresh food was procurable, there was scarcely a person left of all their numbers to get it. Camp after camp, village after village, was left desolate. The remains of which, said the old man, in answer by my queries on this, are found today in the old camp sites or midden-heaps over which the forest has been growing for so many generations. Little by little the remnant left by the disease grew into a nation again, and when the first white men sailed up the Squamish in their big boats, the tribe was strong and numerous again"

The epidemic of the 1770s was the first and the most devastating, with more to follow. During the next few decades, other damaging outbreaks would attack this area: a smallpox epidemic in 1800–01, influenza in 1836–37, measles in 1847–48, and smallpox again in the 1862 Pacific Northwest smallpox epidemic.

=== European colonization and the Indian reserves ===
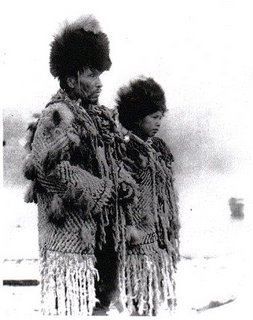
Chief Andrew and his son Alvie Andrews in 1902 wearing traditional garb. Photograph taken in village of Sen̓áḵw.

In 1792, the Squamish people had their first recorded contact with Europeans when British Captain George Vancouver and Spanish Captain Jose Maria Narvaez sailed into Burrard Inlet. European expansion during the fur trade boom, gold rush, along with the subsequent colonization policies by the Canadian government, ushered in a new way of life for the Squamish. In a few years, they had quickly fallen to a small minority, due to more disease, displacement from their land, and the rising European and Asian populations.

In the early 19th century, Fort Langley was the Hudson's Bay Company's first major trading post. During this time, trade went on between the Squamish and Fort Langley. In 1858–59 the Fraser Canyon Gold Rush brought in more foreign settlers to the territory, but major settlement did not begin until after the Canadian Pacific Railway was completed, bringing more foreigners from eastern Canada. During construction of the railway, the treaty process by the Canadian government attempted to settle land issues across the Prairies.

The Squamish were the subject of intensive missionary efforts and the 1913 Catholic Encyclopedia described the Squamish as "almost entirely Catholic".

In 1876 the Indian Act was passed and the Joint Indian Reserve Commission, cordoned off plots of land or Indian reserves, designating Native communities to specific areas. These reserves were managed and controlled by Indian agents from the Department of Northern and Indian Affairs. At the time, numerous reserves were plotted out from already-existing village sites, and then chiefs were assigned to preside over each reserve.

Around the same time, some reserve lands were sold away from their respective families and chiefs, both illegally and legally. One instance of this was the case of Kitsilano Indian Reserve, the location of which was Sen̓áḵw. Portions of this reserve were expropriated, both in 1886 and 1902. Families were forced into leaving, and promised payment for the "sale". The families who lived in the village were placed on a barge and sent out to sea, with the intent for them to move up to the Squamish River area. It was not until 1923 that the reserve chiefs amalgamated into becoming the singular Sḵwx̱wú7mesh Úxwumixw to manage all their reserves.

In 1906, a delegation of chiefs from British Columbia traveled to London to seek an audience with King Edward VII regarding the land confiscated by the government of Canada under the reserve system.

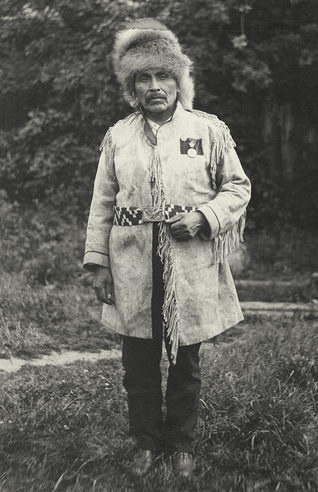
In 1906, Joe Capilano traveled with Cowichan Chief Charley Isipaymilt and Secwepemc Chief Basil David to London to seek an audience with King Edward VII.

Joe Capilano traveled along with Cowichan Chief Charley Isipaymilt and Shuswap Chief Basil David, but their requests to see the King were denied.

== Geography ==
Sḵwx̱wú7mesh (Squamish) territory

The vegetation of the Squamish people's homeland is a dense temperate rainforest, formed mainly of conifers with a spread of maple and alder, as well as large areas of swampland. The evergreen trees are a typical British Columbia coastal mix of Douglas fir, Western red cedar and Western Hemlock. The largest trees of old growth forest were located around Burrard Inlet, the slopes of Sen̓áḵw and the area presently known as False Creek. This abundance in natural resources fueled the Squamish people's affluent culture.

Traditional Squamish territory extends over 673,540 hectares. Squamish settled more permanently into Burrard Inlet to work in the mills and trade with settlers during the mid-1800s. This southern areas of the Indian Arm, along Burrard Inlet, through False Creek then English Bay and Point Grey now serve as the contested southern boundary. Traditionally Squamish would have passed Point Atkinson and Howe Sound as far as Point Grey. From here, it moved northward to Roberts Creek on the Sunshine Coast and up Howe Sound. The northern part included Squamish, Bowen Island, and the Cheakamus, Elaho and Mamquam Rivers. Up the Cheakamus River Squamish territory included land past Whistler, British Columbia.

Squamish territory also overlapped with the territories of neighboring Indigenous peoples. The territory is shared between the territories of the Musqueam, Tsleil-Waututh to the south, and the Lil'wat to the north. These neighbouring peoples also have Squamish language names. The Tsleil-Waututh are Sel̓íl̓witulh, the Shishalh are the Shishá7lh, the Musqueam are Xwmétskwiyam, and the Lil'wat are Lúx̱wels. Roberts Creek is considered the border between the Squamish territory and Shishalh's. The Squamish are culturally and historically similar, but are politically different from their kin, the Tsleil-Waututh. Through family inter-marriage and the land rights that often came with it, many places for resource gathering were also shared.

Vancouver and adjacent municipalities are located within traditional Squamish territory, making the Squamish one of the few Indigenous peoples in Canada to have communities in or near metropolitan areas. Of the 673,540 hectares their traditional territory encompasses, currently less than 0.5% is reserve land allotted to the Squamish Nation. It is on these reserves that most of the current Squamish communities exist.

=== Territory and villages ===
Howe Sound is a core area of Squamish territory and the site of many of their villages. The Squamish people live throughout and outside of their territory. A majority of the people live on Indian reserves (est. 2252 living on reserve) in the Squamish territory. There are communities on 9 of the 26 Squamish reserves. These communities are in North Vancouver, West Vancouver, and along the Squamish River. The reserves are located on long occupied village sites, camp sites, and historical sites. In the old villages large extended families would inhabit a large longhouse. One such house was recorded in present-day Stanley Park at the old village of X̱wáy̓x̱way in the late 1880s. It was recorded as being 60 meters long and near 20 meters wide, and 11 families were said to live in the house.

Below is a chart of Squamish villages, both past and present, with their reserve designation, and other information.

Squamish Name	IPA	Translation	Location	Anglicized, archaic variants or adaptations
Sen̓áḵw	sənakʷ	Inside Head	Kitsilano Indian Reserve No. 6; Vanier Park; Vancouver, British Columbia	Snauq, Snawk
X̱wáy̓x̱way	χʷaj̰χʷaj	Place of Masks	Lumberman's Arch; Stanley Park	Whoi Whoi
Xwmélch'tstn or Xwmélts'stn	xʷəmə́lt͡ʃʼt͡stn	Fast Rolling Waters	Capilano Indian Reserve No.5; West Vancouver, British Columbia	Capilano, Humulchstn
Eslhá7an	əsɬáʔan	Up against it.	Mission Indian Reserve No.1; North Vancouver	Ustlawn, Eslahan, Uslawn
Ch'ích'elxwi7ḵw	ʃʼítʃʼəlxʷiʔqʷʼ	fishing weir village	Seymour Creek Indian Reserve No. 2; Seymour River, North Vancouver	None.
Átsnach	át͡snat͡ʃ	Bay	Burrard Inlet Reserve No.3; North Vancouver	None.
Ch'ḵw'elhp or Schen̓ḵ	t͡ʃʼəqʷəɬp or stʃən̰q	No translation available.	Chekwelp Indian Reserve No. 26, Gibsons, British Columbia	Chekwelp; Schenk
Ḵ'íḵ'elx̱en	qʼíqʼəlxn	Little Fence	Kaikalahun Indian Reserve No. 25, Port Mellon, British Columbia	Kaikalahun
Tsítsusem	t͡sít͡susəm	No translation available.	Potlatch Creek, Howe Sound, British Columbia	None
St'á7mes	stáʔməs	No translation available.	Stawamus Indian Reserve No. 24, below Stawamus Chief Mountain	Stawamus
Yékw'apsem	jə́kʷ'apsəm	Upper part of the neck.	Yekwaupsum Indian Reserve No. 18; Squamish, British Columbia.	Yekwaupsum
Ḵw'éla7en	qʷ'ə́laʔən	Ear	Yekwaupsum Indian Reserve No. 18; Squamish, British Columbia, The Shops.	None
Kaw̓tín	kaw̰tín	No translation available.	Kowtain Indian Reserve No. 17; Squamish, British Columbia	Kowtain
Siy̓ích'em	sij̰ít͡ʃ'əm	Already full	Seaichem Indian Reserve No. 16; Squamish, British Columbia	Seaichem
Wíwḵ'em	wíwq'əm	Open mouth	Waiwaikum Indian Reserve No. 14; Squamish, British Columbia	Waiwaikum
Puḵway̓úsem	puqʷaj̰úsəm	Have a mouldy face	Poquiosin Indian Reserve No. 13; Squamish, British Columbia	Poquiosin
Ch'iyáḵmesh	t͡ʃ'ijáqməʃ	Fish Weir People; People of the Fish Weir	Cheakamus Indian Reserve No. 11; Squamish, British Columbia	Cheakamus
Skáwshn	skáwʃn	Foot descending	Skowishin Indian Reserve No. 7; Squamish, British Columbia	Skowishin
P'uy̓ám̓	p'uj̰ám̰	Blackened from smoke	Poyam Indian Reserve No. 9; Squamish, British Columbia	Poyam

== Society ==
=== Family governance ===
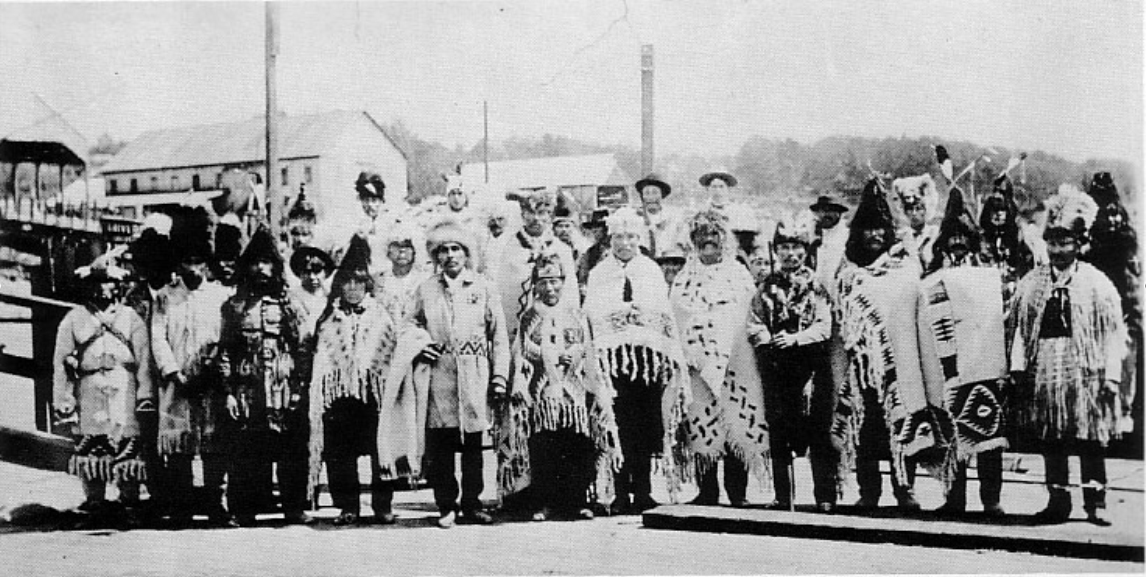
A Delegation of various Salish leaders in Vancouver wearing traditional regalia in 1906

Traditionally, the leadership was grouped with each family having a siy̓ám̓, which loosely translates as "highly respected person". This person would act in the best interest of his family and make decisions based on the group consensus of the family he represented. The siy̓ám̓ has been described as "...the best talker – not chairman, (our people) have no chairman – but man who says the most wise things". The siy̓ám̓ was usually chosen by factors which included his status and respect within the community, the village and other Indigenous nations, and how much he exemplified the characteristics of a noble person, such as humility, respect, generosity, and wisdom.

=== Social structure ===
The Squamish class structure is similar to that of other Coast Salish peoples. Unlike the European class structure, characterized as a pyramid, Squamish classes were historically structured in a manner more comparable to an inverted pear. Nobility, aristocrats, and the like were the most populous, with commoners making a sizable but smaller portion of society compared to nobility. The smallest group were slaves, held only by high-ranking nobles.

The nobility was recognized by three key factors: wealth, especially the amount of wealth they distributed amongst the people; values, particularly the degree to which the values practiced by the person and their family exemplified the values of the people; and knowledge, including both possessing and sharing knowledge of history, traditions and culture and knowledge of skills, whether practical or spiritual.

Sharing wealth was highly regarded and practiced by most high-ranking and wealthy families. This distribution of wealth is a key component of the potlatch gift-giving festival, and was encouraged through the display of values celebrated in the culture such as generosity, humility and respect. Some families were considered nobility because of their connection to spiritual powers or ceremonialism. Shamans, prophets and medicine doctors were considered nobility because of the training and expertise they possessed. Some jobs or positions held by members of the community also signified members of this class. These positions were often related to the mountain goat, like hunting or the weaving of mountain goat wool blankets. One's class was not always predetermined and set for life under this system, and before European contact commoners or slaves had the ability to sometimes rise through the ranks to one day reach a higher class designation.

In the values of the Squamish culture, respect for each other and generosity of both the wealth of wisdom and material wealth was key. Wisdom or knowledge was passed on through oral and visual 'teachings'. In many Western concepts of wealth, the poor and those having little formal education may be regarded as having little to offer. This was not so with the Squamish. As Andy Paull noted, "It was the duty of the more responsible Indians to see that the history and traditions of our race were properly handed down to posterity. A knowledge of our history and legends was similar as an education is regarded among whitemen. Those who possessed it were regarded as aristocrats. Those who were indifferent, whether adults or children, were rascals. Being without means of transmitting it into writing, much time was spent by the aristocrats in importing this knowledge to the youth. It was the responsible duty of responsible elders."

One practice historically done by the Squamish was a custom called flat-foreheading. An infant's head would be placed in a wooden bust model of the head and shoulders to gradually alter the shape of the head into something more flattened in the forehead area. This shape was considered attractive and regarded as a sign of nobility. The last Squamish known to perform this practice was Tim Moody.

==== Property ====
In Squamish society, many things were considered property which were not always referred to as such in European societies. This included names, stories, ceremonies, and songs. This notion of property is more similar to that considered under modern intellectual property law. Other property included fishing spots and hunting trap lines, as well as berry patches, canoes, and works of art. Rights to places to hunt, fish, or gather food could be obtained through marriage to people from other villages or nations.

Names were a type of property handed down through the generations. Names given to a young person after going through a rite of passage would most likely be taken from a deceased ancestor of the family. Before being given this name, children would be referred to by "nicknames" or "pet names", which would be kept until they attained their "ancestral name". These ancestral names are considered important, as many have been passed down through generations. It is only through a blood connection to the ancestor that names were passed down.

Places and resources considered property were much less clearly defined than in the European legal tradition. Locations typically did not have clearly drawn boundary lines, although sometimes certain landmarks served as boundary markers. The value and ownership of places usually correlated to a valuable resource in the location, as opposed to overt physical characteristics. Usually the resources in question were food sources, such as salmon streams, herring spawning grounds, berry patches, and fishing holes.

=== Family and kinship ===
The Squamish kinship is based on a loose patrilineal structure, with large extended families and communal village life. Numerous villages populated the territory, with each village holding many longhouses. Each longhouse was a community in itself, with a number of related families living in the same home. The number of families varied with the size of the house. During the warmer seasons and around times of gatherings, there would be numerous fires within each house, often one for each family. During the winter season, one fire was used for ceremonies and spiritual work taking place in the house.

Historically, marriage would occur through either arranged marriage, or the groom proposing the potential marriage to the father of his prospective wife. If the father endorsed the marriage, he would invite the groom into his house after conducting a test or trial on the young man. Only the wealthiest individuals also practiced polygamy.

== Culture ==
=== Historical and cultural context ===
Through their history, their culture has gone through a great deal of change in the past few hundred years since contact and colonization started. The history of the Residential Schools and the potlatch ban was a part where the Canadian government tried to exterminate their cultural practices. This caused decades of effects with the near extinction of their language, the assimilation into mainstream Western society, and inter-generational trauma. Despite these points in their history, much of their culture is still intact. Some parts of their culture are nonexistent but historical, some parts have changed because of the modern world, and some parts are cultural occurrences but are not historical in a "pre-contact" sense.

=== Customs and daily life ===
Squamish daily life is revolved around the village community. Before European contact, a village consisted of multiple dwellings called longhouses that each housed a large extended family. Within a longhouse, different branches of an extended family operated in different parts of the house. A standard house would be 9 metres (30 feet) wide, 12 metres (40 feet) long and from 4-6 metres (13-19 feet) high, but they could vary in size depending on how big the family was. Within their territory many villages lived near resource or culturally significant places. Kinship ties connected of villages and neighboring Indigenous nations.

Salmon was the main staple of food, once abundant in the area. Squamish cuisine features other seafood, such as herring, shellfish, and seal, complemented by berries and roots.

In large longhouses festivities and ceremonies take place. Things such as naming ceremonies, funerals, memorials for the deceased, weddings, and spiritual events, happen in their longhouses. Potlatch, elaborate events whose name is a Chinook Jargon word meaning to give involved a host or host family inviting guests to participate in a feast, dancing, and ceremonies. A person's position in the community is based on how much they gave of themselves to their people. As such, potlatches are hosted where gifts and material wealth is shared with the community. Food is prepared and a large feast is given to the community. All the foods eaten by their ancestors are considered traditional foods and are usually accompanied in the feast celebrating their Indigenous culture. It was this event that was banned and made illegal by the Canadian government from 1884 to 1951. During that time, their ceremonies and events went underground, only to be revived years later.

Prior to contact, travel was primarily done by canoe. Large cedar trees are cut down and carved into a single cedar dug-out canoe. Families would travel to different villages or nations to visit their relatives, or in the summer months journey to resource rich camping sites to gather food and materials for the colder winter months. In 1992 the construction and revitalization of the canoe culture came back when they construct an ocean-travel canoe. This canoe is measured at 52 feet and was carved from a single cedar tree. Since that time multiple canoes have been carved, either for single-family use, or community-wide use.

=== Art ===
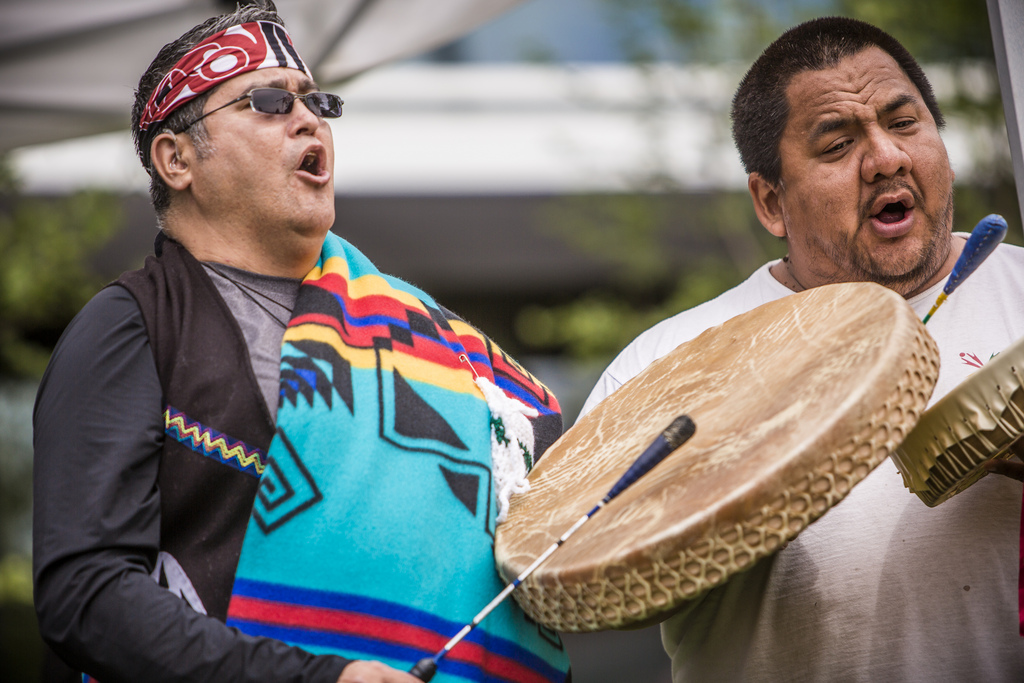
Squamish totem pole raising ceremony, North Vancouver (2012)

Squamish art represents a sophisticated visual tradition that has evolved through centuries of cultural development and continues to thrive today. Traditionally, Squamish artists created works that communicated social status, spiritual beliefs, and historical narratives through a distinct style rooted in the Northwest Coast art tradition.

==== Carving and wood working ====
Carving is among the most esteemed Squamish art forms. Master carvers traditionally created totem poles, ceremonial masks, boxes, and regalia from red cedar and other local woods. Totem poles served multiple functions: they commemorated important events, recorded family histories, and displayed the wealth and prestige of their owners. Each figure carved into a pole carried specific meanings within Squamish culture, with supernatural beings, animal ancestors, and human figures representing different family lines and spiritual connections.

Traditional carving techniques were passed down through apprenticeship, with knowledge held primarily within families of high status. The intricate designs follow consistent design principles featuring formline elements, ovoids, and U-shapes that characterize Northwest Coast Indigenous art. Contemporary Squamish carvers have revitalized these traditions, creating both traditional pieces and modern interpretations that honor ancestral practices while engaging with contemporary artistic expression.

Cedar working extended beyond totem poles to include practical and ceremonial objects: cedar boxes lined with cedar bark, fishing hooks, harpoon heads, and architectural elements. The harvesting of cedar itself was a sacred and carefully regulated practice, with ceremonies and protocols governing how trees were selected and used.

==== Weaving and textiles ====
Weaving represents another central Squamish art form, particularly the production of blankets and clothing from cedar bark, plant fibers, and animal wool. Weavers, traditionally women of noble families, produced the distinctive geometric patterns characteristic of Coast Salish textiles. These blankets held tremendous value—they were displayed at potlatches, given as gifts, and worn during important ceremonies.

Particularly prized were blankets woven from mountain goat wool, which was collected in high alpine areas and represents the labor of highly skilled hunters. The white wool was often combined with cedar bark or other plant materials to create striking contrasting patterns. Woven designs often incorporated symbolic elements representing family crests, natural phenomena, and spiritual concepts.

Contemporary Squamish weavers continue this tradition, using both traditional materials and modern textiles to create works that are exhibited, sold, and used in ceremonies. Language is embedded in weaving practice—many weavers use Squamish names for techniques, materials, and design elements, reinforcing cultural knowledge through creative practice.

==== Painting and graphic art ====
Two-dimensional art including painting and engraving followed the distinctive formline style of Northwest Coast Indigenous art. Artists created designs on hide, wood, and other surfaces that incorporated mythological narratives and family symbolism. The style is characterized by bold black lines, primary colors, and a sophisticated use of positive and negative space.

In the modern era, contemporary Squamish artists have adapted these traditional design principles to painting, printmaking, and digital media. Many artists explicitly draw on ancestral imagery while experimenting with new materials and techniques, bridging traditional knowledge with contemporary artistic practice.

==== Contemporary art and revitalization ====
The revitalization of Squamish art practices accelerated significantly from the late 20th century onward, particularly following the lifting of the potlatch ban in 1951. As communities reclaimed suppressed traditions, artists began formally documenting and teaching traditional techniques in educational settings. Today, Squamish art appears in museums, galleries, and public spaces throughout the region.

Contemporary Squamish artists work across media—sculpture, installation, performance, visual art, and mixed media—while many deliberately engage with traditional iconography and materials. Art serves as a vehicle for cultural assertion, language preservation, and political statement about Indigenous rights and sovereignty. The 1992 ocean canoe carving project, which created a 52-foot cedar canoe from a single tree, exemplifies how artistic practice reinforces cultural identity and community cohesion.

Public art commissions, including totems and other installations in Vancouver and surrounding municipalities, assert Squamish presence in urban spaces historically occupied by their ancestors. These works function both as cultural expression and as acts of reclamation within colonial contexts.

=== Language ===
The Squamish language, or Sḵwx̱wú7mesh sníchim, is the ancestral language of the Squamish people. It is considered an important part of cultural revitalization. Although nearing language extinction, it is still used in ceremonies, events, and basic conversation among some. As the language is moribund, with no children learning it as a first language and all language speakers over the age of 65, much work is being done to preserve and revitalize it. The language is part the Coast Salish linguistic group, and most closely related to Sháshíshálh (Sechelt), and (Halkomelem) and Xwsa7km (Lhéchalosem). Many anthropologists and linguists have worked with Squamish people and their language including Franz Boas, Charles Hill-Tout, Homer Barnett, and Aert H. Kuipers.

Since the late 19th century the language has had a history. Before contact, it was the prominent language of all the villages, along with the Chinook Jargon. Most children would learn Chinook as a first language because it was so basic, then Squamish language as they become older. After the spread of diseases which caused massive population drops and after colonizations of the territory, the language became a minority language in its own lands. When the Canadian government enforced an assimilationist policies regarding their culture and language, a residential school was set up in the village of Eslha7an with children coming from many Squamish villages, plus some Church officials sending children to another school in Sechelt. At the school, a home for many children 10 months out of the year, the children were forbidden to speak their Squamish language. This caused a deep resentment about speaking the language, and so the next generation grew up without any knowledge of their native tongue.

Over the years, English became the prominent language. Then during the 1960s, a great deal of documentation and work took place to help in the revitalization of the Squamish language. The BC Language Project of Randy Bouchard and Dorthy Kennedy undertook more documentation under the direction of these two main collaborators of this project. They devised the present writing system that is used for the language. Eventually a local elementary as well as a high school came to include Squamish language classes in place of the usual French language option. A children's school called Xwemelch'stn Estimxwataxw School, meaning Xwmelch'stn Littleones School, with grades kindergarten to 3, was built to assist in language immersion, with plans to expand it into a full immersion programmed school.

== Food and cuisine ==
=== Nutrition ===
Coast Salish peoples' had complex land management practices linked to ecosystem health and resilience. Forest gardens on Canada's northwest coast included crabapple, hazelnut, cranberry, wild plum, and wild cherry species. Squamish territory was abundant in rich food sources from land animals to sea life and plants and animals. For meat, deer, bear, elk, duck, swan, and small rodents such as squirrel. With ocean food it was mussels, sea eggs, cockles, clams, seaweed, herring, trout, crab, urchin, sea lion, seal, and all kinds of salmon. For berries and plants, it was different kinds of wild blueberry, blackberry, salmon berry, salal berry, five different kinds of grass and the roots of different plants. Ooligans were once in their river system and Ooligan grease was once made from it. Sea food, particularly salmon was their main staple. It was this abundance of sea food and salmon that their diet was considerably heavy on natural fats and oils. This left relatively small amounts of carbohydrates in the diet. To ensure that essentials vitamins are acquired, they eat almost all parts of animals which they harvest. Ground calcined shells, algae and seaweeds were sources of calcium for Indigenous peoples. Vitamin A is obtained from liver. Vitamin C is primarily found in berries and some other plants. Intestines and stomachs can be eaten to provide vitamin E and the vitamin B complexes. Within the decade following the establishment of Fort Langley in 1827 the Squamish had begun extensive farming of potatoes.

=== Salmon ===
As the most important food staple, salmon had esteemed respect within Squamish culture. At a yearly springtime Thanksgiving Ceremony or First Salmon Ceremony, specially prepared fish was made for community gatherings. After the community feasted, they would follow a time-honored ritual as they returned the bones to the water. A story recounts how the salmon come to the Squamish people; the salmon have their own world, and an island far out in the ocean. They appear every year to sacrifice themselves to feed the people, but the people asked that after the people are done with them, they return the salmon bones back to the ocean so they can come back.

Salmon was caught using a variety of methods, the most common being the fishing weir. These traps allowed skilled hunters to easily spear a good amount of fish with little effort. Fish weirs were regularly used on the Cheakamus River, which takes its name from the village of Chiyakmesh. This translates into People of the Fish Weir, denoting the weir utilized in this area. This method of fishing required extensive cooperation between the men fishing and the women on the shore doing the cleaning.

In the past, salmon would be roasted over fires and eaten fresh, or dried for preservation. Using smoke over alder or hemlock fires preserved salmon so it could be stored for up two years. It could be soaked in water and prepared for eating. Over time, this evolved into a method preserving salmon through canning. Canned salmon are jarred or pickled, then stored for winter months.

== Notable Squamish ==
- Joe Capilano (ca.1854–1910), fought for the recognition of Native rights and lifestyle.
- August Jack Khatsahlano (1877–1971), a Squamish medicine man
- Andy Paull (1892–1959), a Squamish leader, activist, coach and lawyer.
- Harriet Nahanee (1935–2007), an Indigenous rights activist, residential school alumna and environmental activist.
- Ian Campbell (born 1974 or 1975), an Indigenous Canadian politician.
- Khelsilem, Squamish Nation political leader and candidate

== See also ==
- Coast Salish peoples
- Coast Salish languages
- History of Squamish and Tsleil-Waututh longshoremen, 1863–1963
- Squamish Nation
- Squamish language

== Bibliography ==
- Barman, Jean (2007). Stanley Park's Secret: The Forgotten Families of Whoi Whoi, Kanaka Ranch and Brockton Point. Harbour Publishing. ISBN 978-1-55017-420-5.
- Clark, Ella E. (2003). Indian Legends of the Pacific Northwest. University of California Press. ISBN 0-520-23926-1.
- Hill-Tout, Charles (1978). Salish People: Volume II: the Squamish and the Lillooet. Talonbooks. ISBN 0-88922-149-9.
- Matthews, Major J. S. (1955). Conversations with Khahtsahlano 1932–1954. City of Vancouver Archives.
