= Kitsilano =

- Neighbourhood of Vancouver
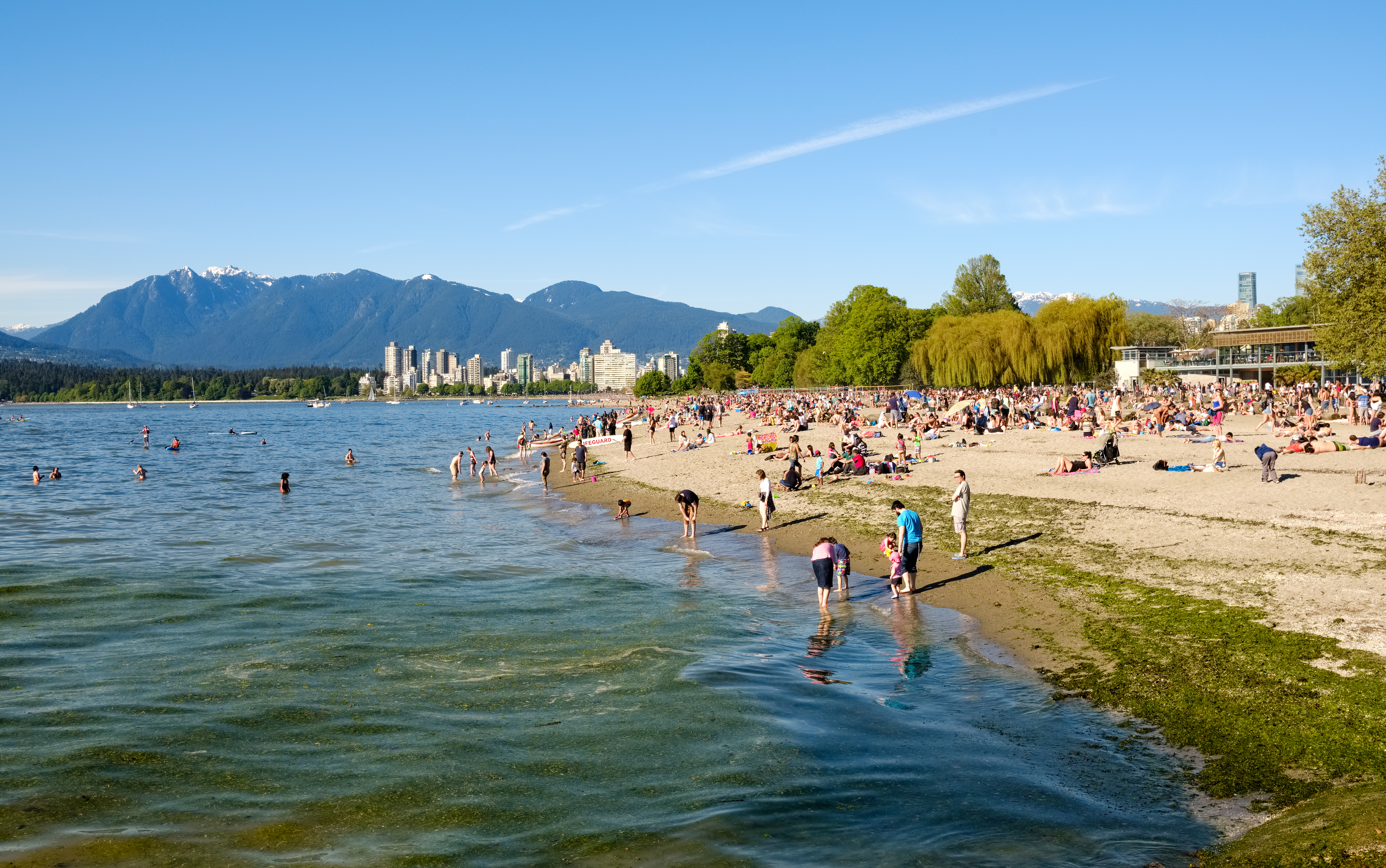
- Kitsilano Beach
- Nickname: Kits
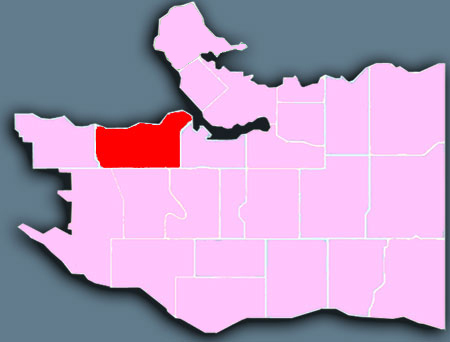
- Location of Kitsilano (in red) in Vancouver

- Location of Kitsilano in Metro Vancouver
- Coordinates: 49°16′00″N 123°10′00″W
- Country: Canada
- Province: British Columbia
- City: Vancouver
- Named for: August Jack Khatsahlano

Area
  - Land: 5.46 km^{2} (2.11 sq mi)

Population (2016)
  - Total: 43,045
  - Density: 7,883.6/km^{2} (20,418/sq mi)

Age
  - ≤19: 13.3%
  - 20-39: 40.1%
  - 40-64: 32.8%
  - ≥65: 13.8%

First Language
  - English: 74.2%
  - Chinese: 5.6%
  - French: 2.6%
- Time zone: UTC-8 (PST)
  - Summer (DST): UTC-7 (PDT)
- Forward sortation area: V6J, V6K
- Area codes: 604, 778, 236, 672
- Median Income: $72,839
- Population in low-income households: 21.3%
- Unemployment rate: 5.2%
- Website: vancouver.ca/green-vancouver/kitsilano.aspx

Kitsilano (/kɪtsəˈlænoʊ/ kit-sə-LAN-oh) is a neighbourhood in the city of Vancouver, British Columbia, Canada. Named after Squamish chief August Jack Khatsahlano, Kitsilano is located along the southern shore of English Bay between Fairview and West Point Grey, with Burrard Street as the neighbourhood's eastern boundary, Alma Street its western boundary, and 16th Avenue its southern boundary. The area is mostly residential with two main commercial areas, West 4th Avenue and West Broadway, known for their retail stores, restaurants and organic food markets.

== Pre-colonial history ==
The area has been home to the Squamish people for thousands of years, sharing the territory with the Musqueam and the Tsleil-Waututh Peoples. All three Nations moved throughout their shared traditional territory, using the resources it provided for fishing, hunting, trapping and gathering.

== Post-colonial history ==
The name 'Kitsilano' is derived from X̱ats'alanexw, the Squamish name of chief August Jack Khatsahlano.

In 1911, an amendment to the Indian Act by the federal government to legalize the unsettling of reserves stated that "an Indian reserve which adjoins or is situated wholly or partly within an incorporated town or city having a population of [more] than eight thousand", could at the recommendation of the Superintendent General be removed without their consent if it was "having regard to the interest of the public" without the need for consent from the reserve's residents.

Subsequently, both provincial and federal governments began the "unsettling of reserves" process, which was the "emptying" of the reserves that "be[came] a source of nuisance and an impediment to progress", or, in other words, the government unsettled reserves for growing cities and potential business ventures; and by the end of 1911 the reserve was sold to the Government of British Columbia. At this time in Canadian history, the federal government had already isolated the Indigenous population on to morsels of reserve lands, only to further deprive Indigenous peoples of what the government first thought was negligible land.

The Squamish Nation formally surrendered the majority of reserve to the federal government in 1946. Part of the expropriated land was used by the Canadian Pacific Railway who pursued selling the land they had deed to in the 1980s despite the original agreement with the Squamish Nation that they should regain control of the land. This went to court, and in August 2002 the BC Court of Appeals upheld a lower court's ruling in favour of the Squamish. This Indian reserve land is at the foot of the Burrard Street Bridge, called Senakw (commonly spelled Snauq historically) in the Squamish language, and sənaʔqʷ in the Musqueam people's hən'q'əmin'əm' language, where August Jack Khatsahlano lived.

The forced relocation of the Musqueam Nation by the Canadian government resulted in a Musqueam Reserve created on the north arm of the Fraser River. The Squamish Nation was forcibly relocated to reserves on the north shore of Burrard Inlet, currently the cities North Vancouver and West Vancouver, as well as the False Creek Indian Reserve No. 6.

=== False Creek Indian Reserve No. 6 ===
The False Creek Indian Reserve No. 6, also known as the Kitsilano Indian Reserve, is an Indian Reserve developed by the colonial government in 1869. The reserve is located on the former site of a Squamish village, known as "sən’a?qw" in hən’q’emin’əm’, the language of the Musqueam people, and as "Sen’ákw" in Sḵwx̱wú7mesh sníchim, the language of the Squamish people. Inside the reserve there was a large longhouse that housed families, held potlach ceremonies, and became a central point of trade. The land appealed to its residents and attracted settlers by providing access to natural resources. It served as an important fishing area where inhabitants could set up tidal weirs of vine maple fencing and nettle fibre nets to catch fish. Additionally, the Squamish people cultivated an orchard as well as cherry trees on this land. Between 1869 and 1965, as the development of railway lines drew attention to the reserve, the Burrard Street Bridge and various leases began to occupy the reserve land. The land set aside for the Squamish people was continually appropriated until it was completely sold off. After decades of legal proceedings, the Squamish Nation reclaimed a small amount of the reserve land in 2002.

== Settler history ==
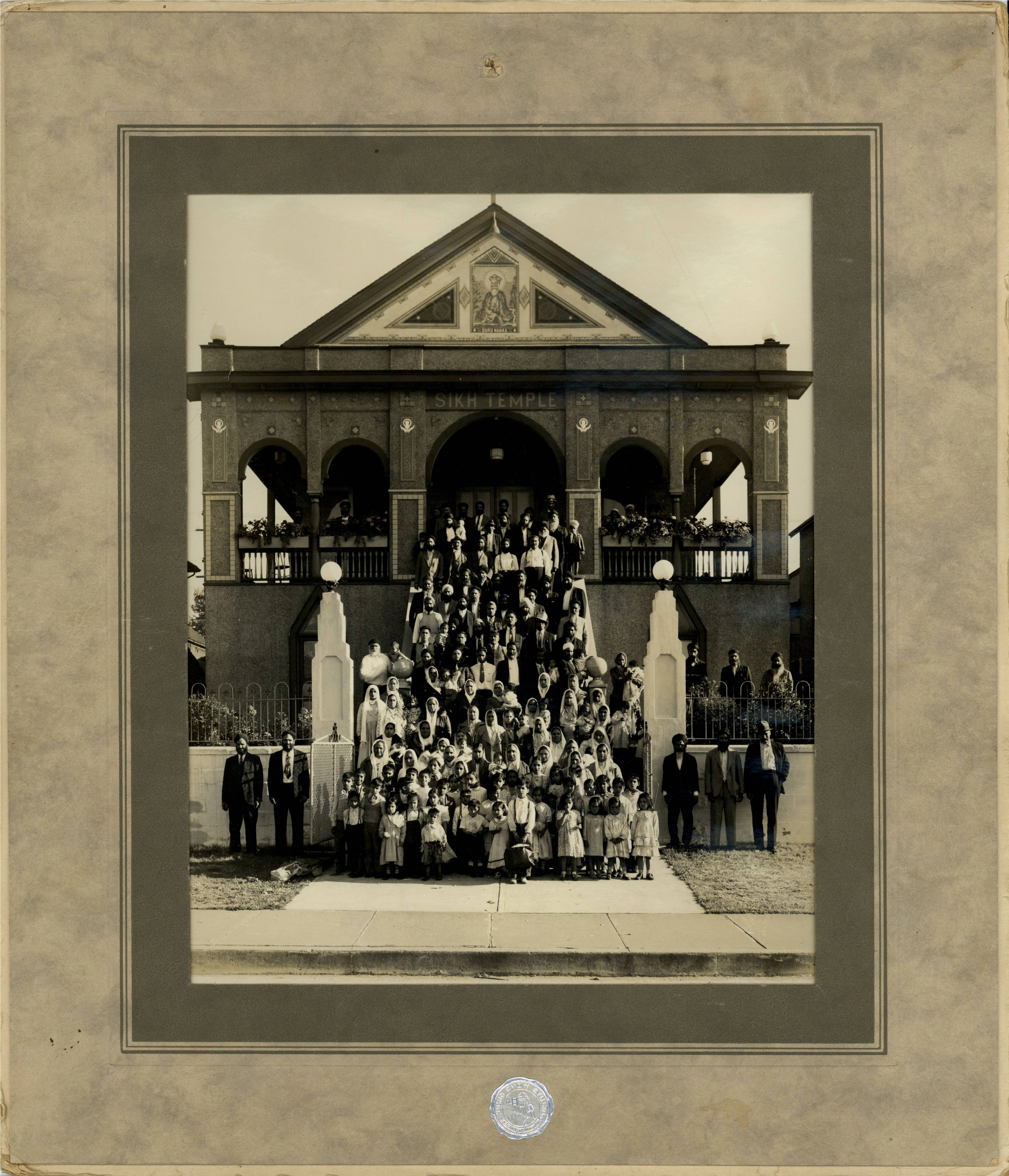
Kitsilano Sikh temple, 1910

=== First industry and development ===
Most of the area now known as Kitsilano was within the boundaries of Vancouver when it was incorporated in 1886. What is now 16th Avenue was Vancouver's southern boundary, and its western boundary was what is now Trafalgar Street.

Jerry Rogers began logging in the area in 1867 at Jerry's Cove, later known as Jericho. By 1880 the eastern section of Kitsilano was logged off. In 1882 Sam Greer pre-empted 160 acres on the Kitsilano waterfront and with his family began farming it. In 1884, Canadian Pacific Railway (CPR) manager William Van Horne was negotiating to extend the CPR right of way along the waterfront to what is now Trafalgar Street. That land, and Greer's farm, was included in the 6000 acres granted by the provincial government to the CPR in 1891. Greer was forced out but the beach retained his name. In 1901, the name "Kitsilano" became the official designation, as suggested to the CPR (who were considering building a hotel at the beach) by postmaster Jonathan Miller.

The English Bay Cannery operated at the foot of Bayswater Street from 1898 to 1905.

In 1907, several Kitsilano streets were renamed because they duplicated names in other parts of the city. The new names, some inspired by battles, were Alma Road (formerly Campbell Street), Waterloo Road (Lansdowne Street), Balaclava Road (Richard Street), Blenheim Road (Cornwall Street), Trafalgar Road (Boundary Street) and Point Grey Road (Victoria Street).

The British Columbia Electric Railway Company expanded passenger service to Greer's Beach in 1905 with a streetcar line across the railway trestle over False Creek. A line along 4th Avenue to Alma Road in 1909 resulted in the blocks north of 4th between Blenheim Street and Alma being completely developed as a residential neighbourhood within a year.

Kitsilano was the site of the second Sikh temple to be built in Canada, a few years after the first opened in Golden in 1905. Opened in 1908, the temple served early South Asian settlers who worked at nearby sawmills along False Creek at the time. The Second Avenue Gurdwara served a community numbering around 2000. The building was sold in 1970 to raise money to build the Ross Street Gurdwara in southeast Vancouver.

The influence of Greek immigrants to Kitsilano can still be seen among the businesses along Broadway west of Macdonald. Residents of Greek origin in Vancouver numbered around 3000 in the early 1960s, but were estimated to be as many as 13,000 in 1973. They tended to settle near the Greek Orthodox church (now Kitsilano Neighbourhood House) at 7th and Vine.

=== Second round of development ===
In the 1950s, zoning changes in much of Kitsilano permitted low-rise apartments, and many larger houses were converting to rooming houses. Kitsilano residents fought for zoning changes from one- to two-family districts. In 1972, the proposal for a highrise apartment facing Kitsilano Beach caused city council to order a zoning change to a three-storey limit in the waterfront area. Residents expressed fear of Kitsilano turning into a concrete jungle like the West End. In 1974, protesters formed a human chain in front of bulldozers after houses were demolished to make room for a high-rise tower at Balsam Street and 3rd Avenue. The City opened an area planning office at 2384 West 4th Avenue in response to demands by local groups that residents have some input into the development of their neighbourhoods.

The area was an inexpensive neighbourhood to live in the 1960s and attracted many from the counterculture from across Canada and the United States and was known as one of the two hotbeds of the hippie culture in the city, the other being Gastown. Close proximity to downtown Vancouver, walking distance to parks, beaches and popular Granville Island has made the neighbourhood a very desirable community to live. One of the main concert venues in the city in the days of the counterculture was the Soft Rock Cafe, an all-ages coffee house and music venue near 4th and Maple which operated from 1976 to 1984. Further west, Rohan's Rockpile was another 1970s music venue.

One remaining artifact of the 1960s is the Naam Cafe at 4th and Macdonald, providing vegetarian, vegan, and natural foods. The area is also known for having the first of certain kinds of restaurants, such as the California-style Topanga Cafe, destroyed by fire in 2018. Two of the first neighbourhood pub licenses in Vancouver are still located on 4th Avenue - Bimini's at Maple and Darby D. Dawes at Macdonald.

=== Activism ===
Greenpeace held meetings at Kits Neighbourhood House in 1974 - 1975 when it opened an office on 4th Avenue and Maple, sharing the space with the Society Promoting Environmental Conservation (SPEC).

The first membership meeting of the Green Party of British Columbia was held at the Museum of Vancouver in 1983. The party office was originally located in the home of longtime party leader Adriane Carr and her husband Paul George on Trafalgar Street, near 2nd, in early 1983, before being moved by the summer of that year to offices near Broadway and Cypress, which also became the first offices of the Green Party of Canada.

== Demographics ==
As of 2016, Kitsilano has 43,045 people. 13.3% of the population is under the age of 20; 40.1% is between 20 and 39; 32.8% is between 40 and 64; and 13.8% is 65 or older. 74.2% of Kitsilano residents speak English as a first language, 5.6% speak a Chinese language, 2.6% speak French and 0.2% speaking hən'q'əmin'əm. The median household income is $72,839 and 14.7% of its population lives in low-income households. The unemployment rate is 5.2%. Among neighbourhoods, in 2016, Kitsilano had the second highest (after Grandview-Woodland) percentage of third-or-higher-generation (parents born in Canada) residents in Vancouver.

Panethnic groups in the Kitsilano neighbourhood (2001−2016)
Panethnic group	2016		2006		2001	
Panethnic group	Pop.	%	Pop.	%	Pop.	%
European (Note: Statistic includes all persons that did not make up part of a visible minority or an indigenous identity.)	33,440	78.21%	33,450	82.83%	33,595	85.2%
East Asian (Note: Statistic includes total responses of "Chinese", "Korean", and "Japanese" under visible minority section on census.)	4,690	10.97%	3,850	9.53%	3,485	8.84%
South Asian	1,075	2.51%	655	1.62%	590	1.5%
Indigenous	735	1.72%	480	1.19%	345	0.87%
Southeast Asian (Note: Statistic includes total responses of "Filipino" and "Southeast Asian" under visible minority section on census.)	720	1.68%	500	1.24%	335	0.85%
Latin American	700	1.64%	505	1.25%	255	0.65%
Middle Eastern (Note: Statistic includes total responses of "West Asian" and "Arab" under visible minority section on census.)	485	1.13%	305	0.76%	320	0.81%
African	400	0.94%	310	0.77%	250	0.63%
Other/Multiracial (Note: Statistic includes total responses of "Visible minority, n.i.e." and "Multiple visible minorities" under visible minority section on census.)	510	1.19%	330	0.82%	255	0.65%
Total responses	42,755	99.33%	40,385	99.48%	39,430	99.52%
Total population	43,045	100%	40,595	100%	39,620	100%
Note: Totals greater than 100% due to multiple origin responses

== Culture & recreation ==
The Museum of Vancouver has gained several pieces of Northwest Coast art from Indigenous artists. Much of the work is displayed in a wide variety of mediums to showcase the Indigenous culture that surrounds this city.

Kitsilano is home to a number of Vancouver's annual festivals and events:

- Each June, Greek Day is an annual street festival celebrating Greek culture and cuisine along several blocks of Greek West Broadway, which is Vancouver's Greektown.
- Vanier Park is home to Bard on the Beach, the outdoor Shakespeare festival running from June to September.
- The Celebration of Light fireworks competition is held mid-summer on the waters of English Bay between Vanier Park and the West End.
- The Khatsahlano Street Party is held on 4th Avenue on a July Saturday.
- During the summer months, the long-running Kitsilano Showboat hosts a series of free community events near Kitsilano Beach. World-famous Vancouver thespians who got their start there include Alan Young and Barbara Parkins.

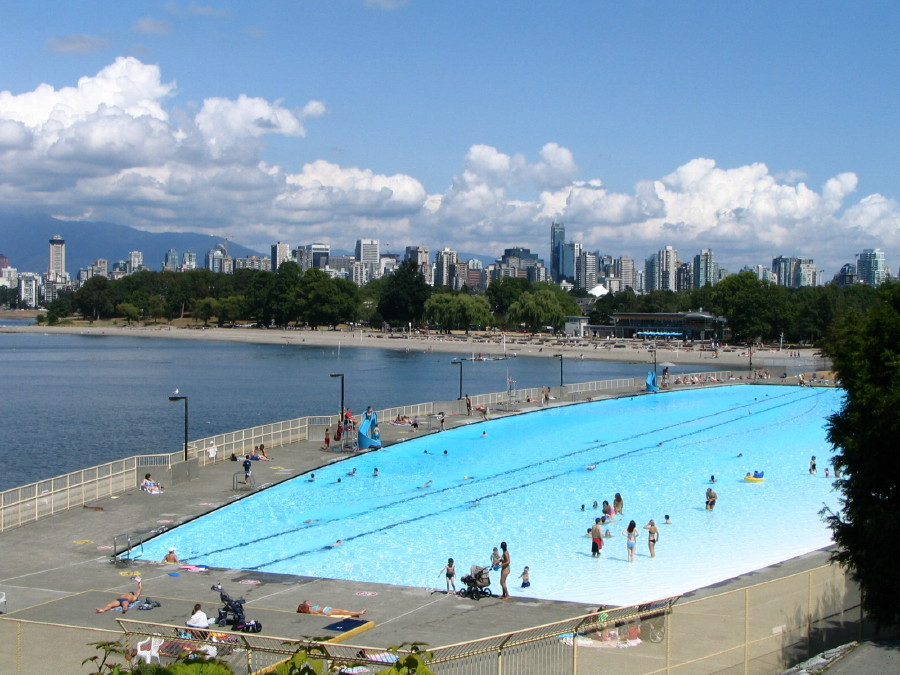
Kitsilano Pool in Kitsilano Beach Park

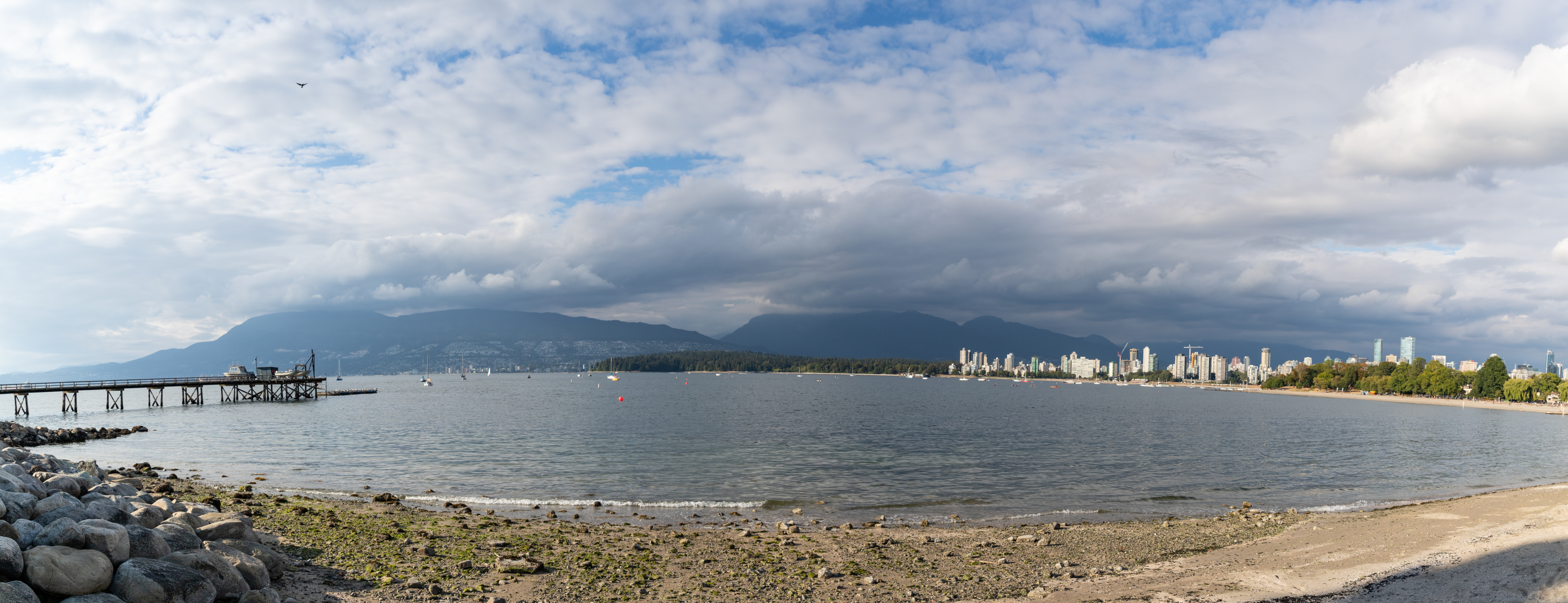
Kitsilano Bay Vancouver

=== Parks and beaches ===
Kitsilano is home to 17 parks, which include six playgrounds, an off-leash dog park, and Kitsilano Beach, one of Vancouver's most popular beaches. Along with the beach itself, Kitsilano Beach Park also contains a franchise restaurant, Kitsilano Pool, and the Kitsilano Showboat. The Kitsilano Showboat, operating since 1935, is essentially an open-air amphitheatre with the ocean and mountains as a backdrop. It is located on the south side of the Kitsilano Pool along Cornwall Avenue. Until being damaged by fire in 2023, it hosted free performances from local bands, dance groups, and other performers all summer long, its main goal being to entertain residents and tourists, showcasing amateur talent. Beatrice Leinbach, MOC, or "Captain Bea," played a role in maintaining the showboat since the mid-1940s. As of 2006, she was the president of the non-profit Kitsilano Showboat Society.

As of September 2018, there was an attempt to reconcile with the Indigenous communities whose land was taken during the expansion of Vancouver. By renaming the beaches and parks, one of which included Kitsilano Beach, Stuart Mackinnon park board chairman was going to work with the Musqueam, Squamish, and Tsleil-Waututh Nations to rename those areas after their original Indigenous names. However, the Indigenous community replied by saying the original areas were not named previously, because they were only forests before colonization. As of today no beaches or parks, including Kitsilano Beach have been renamed in the hən'q'əmin'əm' (Musqueam Halkomelem) or Skwxwú7mesh Snichim (Squamish language).

Vanier Park is another one of Kitsilano's most popular parks, and is the location of the Museum of Vancouver, the H. R. MacMillan Space Centre, the Vancouver Maritime Museum, the Vancouver Archives, and the Vancouver Academy of Music as well as the public art installations Gate to the Northwest Passage by artist Alan Chung Hung and "Freezing Water #7" by Jun Ren.

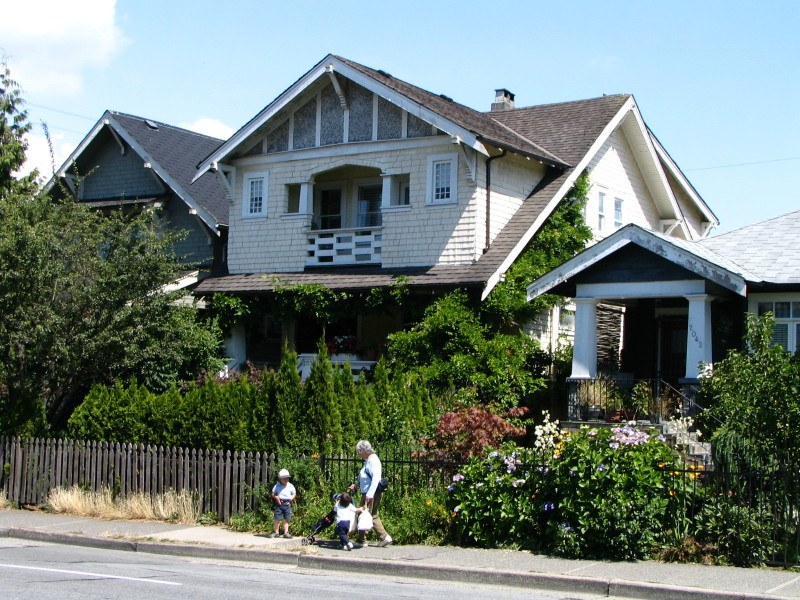
Macdonald St at 5th Ave

=== Buildings ===
Landmark buildings in Kitsilano include the Museum of Vancouver and H. R. MacMillan Space Centre, St. Roch National Historic Site of Canada, Kitsilano Secondary School and the Bessborough Armoury.

Among many original structures repurposed is Kitsilano Neighbourhood House at 7th Avenue and Vine Street. It combines the 1909 Hay House and a former Greek Orthodox church built in 1930 and now functions as a neighbourhood centre offering childcare, a performance/meeting hall and seniors' housing. St. James Community Square on 10th Avenue at šxʷməθkʷəy̓əmasəm, incorporating the former St. James church, with meeting spaces, a daycare, gym, multi-purpose rooms and a performance venue, Mel Lehan Hall, is a hub for artists, activists and community groups of all kinds. Another repurposed church building is at 3rd Avenue and Vine Street. Built in 1910–11, Kitsilano Presbyterian Church became the home of several congregations and the Vancouver Indian Centre before being converted to apartments in 1985.

Arbutus Coffee at 6th Avenue occupies a former grocery store built in 1907. The 1911-built Eastern Townships Bank (later Canadian Imperial Bank of Commerce) at 4th and Yew Street is now a retail clothing store. At 2114 West 4th, the Russian Community Centre (acquired from Famous Players in 1958) began life in 1913 as the Kitsilano Theatre. The 1932 Imperial Gasoline service station on Cornwall Avenue at Yew Street was sold by Imperial in the late 1970s and, with an added wing, has been home to a series of restaurants ever since. The Hollywood Theatre on Broadway, built in the Art Deco style of the day, operated as a neighbourhood movie theatre from 1935 until 2011. It was renovated, retaining many original features, in 2020 and is now a film and music venue.

Busy Macdonald Street and some quiet, leafy adjoining streets still have some 1910s–1920s craftsman houses that cannot be found anywhere else in Vancouver. According to Exploring Vancouver, an architectural guide to the city:

Kitsilano developed as a less expensive suburban alternative to the West End. Endless rows of developer-built houses lined the grid of streets, their gabled roofs picturesque and not boring. Many (...) resemble West End houses of preceding years, but have the wider proportions, broad verandahs, and wood brackets popularized by the newer and trendier California bungalow.

— Harold Kalman, Ron Phillips & Robin Ward, Exploring Vancouver

== Government ==
Kitsilano is situated within the Canadian federal electoral districts of Vancouver Quadra and Vancouver Granville, currently held by Wade Grant and Taleeb Noormohamed, respectively. Both are members of the Liberal Party of Canada. Provincially, Kitsilano lies within the Legislative Assembly of British Columbia electoral districts of Vancouver-Point Grey, Vancouver-Fairview, and Vancouver-False Creek. Vancouver-Point Grey is currently held by David Eby of the BC NDP, Vancouver-Little Mountain by Christine Boyle, and Vancouver-South Granville by Brenda Bailey, also BC NDP members.

== Notable residents ==
Kitsilano is the current or former home of a number of notable residents including former Squamish chief August Jack Khatsahlano (whom the area is named after), environmentalist David Suzuki, writers William Gibson and Philip K. Dick, actors Ryan Reynolds, Jason Priestley, and Joshua Jackson, ice hockey players Trevor Linden and Ryan Kesler, and comedian Brent Butt.

Other current and former residents of Kitsilano include:

- Robin Blaser, poet
- George Bowering, author
- Sven Butenschön, former ice hockey player
- Chelah Horsdal, actress
- Gregory Henriquez, architect
- Eric Johnson, actor
- Peter Kelamis, actor, comedian
- Tinsel Korey, actress
- Major J.S. Matthews, first city archivist
- Frank Palmer, businessman, advertising executive (DDB Canada)
- Evelyn Roth, artist
- Michael Saxell, songwriter, musician
- Jack Shadbolt, artist
- Jared Slingerland, producer, musician
- Spirit of the West, folk music group
- Mark Vonnegut, pediatrician, memoirist, son of Kurt Vonnegut Jr.
- Jeff Wall, artist
- Chip Wilson, founder of Lululemon
- Finn Wolfhard, actor, musician, voice actor, filmmaker

== See also ==
- Seaforth Peace Park
- Senakw
- Squamish Nation
- List of neighbourhoods in Vancouver
- List of Squamish villages
