= Musqueamview Street =

Street in Vancouver, Canada

šxʷməθkʷəy̓əmasəm Street
- Musqueamview Street
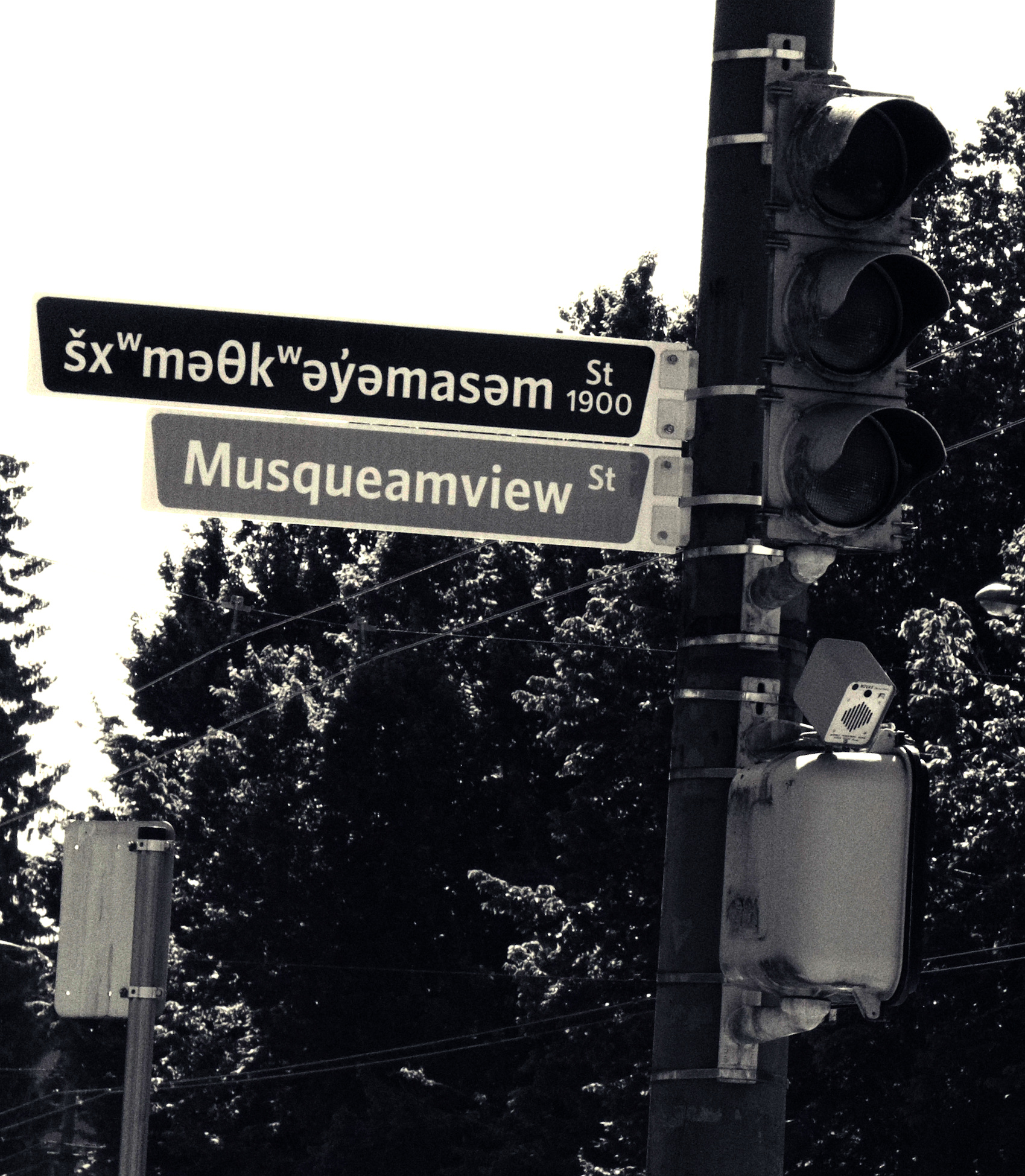
- The street's signs, showing both the official Halkomelem name and the alternative English translation.
- Interactive map of šxʷməθkʷəy̓əmasəm Street
- Former name: Trutch Street
- Namesake: Musqueam First Nation
- Length: 1.65 km (1.03 mi)
- Location: Kitsilano, Vancouver
- Coordinates: 49°15′54″N 123°10′33″W
- North end: W 1st Avenue
- South end: W 18th Avenue

Other
- Known for: Name

Musqueamview Street or šxʷməθkʷəy̓əmasəm Street (Halkomelem pronunciation: [ʃxʷməθkʷəj̰əmasəm]), formerly known as Trutch Street, is a street in the Kitsilano neighbourhood of Vancouver that gained media attention when Vancouver City Council voted to rename it in 2021. The street was officially renamed on June 16, 2025. It is the only road in the city to be named using a non-English alphabet.

The street goes North–South through Kitsilano, from 1st to 18th Avenue.

== History ==
The road was built as a boulevard with crushed-stone parking bays on either side, described as "economical and elegant ... an extremely beautiful design".

== Name ==
šxʷməθkʷəy̓əmasəm means Musqueamview in the Halkomelem language, the native language of the people of Musqueam. The name was gifted by the Musqueam Indian Band in a ceremony in September 2022, after Vancouver City Council voted to rename it in 2021. A new street name sign was installed on 20 June 2025 at a ceremony at which the Musqueam chief, Wayne Sparrow, and the mayor of Vancouver, Ken Sim, spoke.

The city council has established an English translation, Musqueamview Street, to be used for where the Halkomelem name cannot be used, including mail delivery systems.

The street was originally named after Joseph Trutch, who served as the first lieutenant governor of British Columbia, and was renamed due to his anti-Indigenous actions and policies, with Global News saying he "was openly hostile to First Nations, denied the existence of Aboriginal rights, and did not recognize previously established Indian Reserves".

=== Reactions to renaming ===
Jamie Sarkonak of the National Post argued that the name will make wayfinding, mail writing, legal documentation (including tax, bank and insurance documentation), transit, and communication, including with emergency services, unnecessarily difficult. Some residents have complained that they have had difficulties updating bank documentation. Ken Sim, the mayor of Vancouver, has pointed out that residents can use the English name "Musqueamview Street", citing its appearance on Google Maps, and saying that "Change is hard, but it's the right change."

The Squamish Nation has disputed the name change, saying that the street is also located on former Squamish land and criticizing the lack of consultation with their council.

The two-week notice given has also been criticized for being too short for residents.
