= August Jack Khatsahlano =

Squamish leader (1867–1971)

August Jack (Khatsahlano, X̱ats'alanexw) (July 16, 1877 – June 5, 1971) was an Indigenous chief of the Squamish people. He was born in the village of X̱wáýx̱way or Chaythoos on the peninsula that is now Stanley Park, Vancouver, British Columbia, Canada, the son of Supple Jack "Khay- Tulk" of Chaythoos and Sally "Owhaywat" from the Yekwaupsum Reserve north of Squamish, British Columbia. His grandfather was Chief Khahtsahlano of Senakw (aka Snauq or Sun'ahk) who had migrated from his home at Toktakanmic on the Squamish River to Chaythoos, and the man from whom he inherited his name. The suffix "lan-ogh" in their name means "man".

== Life ==
August Jack's father died when he was about 6 years old, and his mother remarried Shinatset (Jericho Charlie). One day soon after Supple Jack's burial at Chaythoos, city surveyors unexpectedly started chopping down his family's house while they were inside. They were to build a road around the area, naming it Park Road. As August Jack recalls in his conversations with J. S. Matthews, the road around the park "did not touch my father's grave, so they left it there, but when it came we had to move away. We had to move out of the house and they tore it down, but they left the grave for a long time, until after Lord Stanley named the park Stanley Park. Then they took the coffin up to Squamish." August Jack's family home and village were destroyed, and himself and the other members of the community were relocated to Snauq, the area under the southern end of the Burrard Bridge at the mouth of False Creek, while some people went to live on the reserve at Kitsilano Point. He lived in the village of Snauq for most of his early life, working at a sawmill nearby. At this Squamish village around 1900, in a ceremony attended by visiting people from Musqueam, Nanaimo, Sechelt, and Ustlawn (North Vancouver) his grandfather's name was given to him as his own. In this same ceremony, his brother Willie was named Khay-Tulk after his father. August Jack gave a potlatch and feast for the guests in attendance and distributed over one hundred blankets to them.

He lived at the village of Snauq until 1913 when the government bought the reserve land. He then moved to the Squamish reserve and married his wife Swanamia (Mary Anne) They had five children together: Emma, Celestine, Wilfred, Irene, and Louise. August Jack and his family lived in Squamish for years, and moved to multiple Sḵwxwú7mesh villages including Xwemelch'stn, Stawamus and Snauq for a short time, but they ultimately moved back to Squamish where they had their own home on the reserve. August Jack worked in logging and trapping in the area. built canoes and totem poles, made carvings, drove logs down the Squamish River, and "often ferried many of the Squamish Indians to Vancouver in his large, heavy canoes." Swanamia and August Jack remained here until his death.

== History of the area ==
European settlement in the Burrard Inlet area began in the 1860s, but historical evidence shows that native settlements in the area were present three thousand years ago. During the time of European settlement, Xwayxway was the largest village in the Burrard Inlet, and one of the "largest, most densely populated nations in aboriginal North America... [it] was unique because it did not depend on agriculture", but thrived off of fishing and hunting. The Squamish nation that August Jack was a part of was only the most recent group of people inhabiting the part of Coast Salish Territory known as the Stanley Park peninsula. There have been land claims of historical settlement on the land by the Sto:Lo, Musqueam, Tseil Waututh and the Hul Qumi Num, but the Squamish people had migrated to the Burrard Inlet and Snauq every summer to gather food, and would move north to Squamish again in the winter.

After the settlement of the Europeans, sawmills were erected and began employing indigenous Squamish people. This was a time when many indigenous people from further north moved permanently to the area around the Burrard Inlet. In the 1890s, the areas around the village of Snauq were purchased by land developers David Oppenheimer, C.D. Rand and R.G. Tatlow without federal authority, for $218,750. Khahtsahlano and the people of Snauq were forcibly moved to the Capilano Indian Reserve. In 1976, the Squamish "launched a retroactive appeal" on the federal government for compensation. They did not accept the proposed $92.5 million trust.

== Legacy ==
Chief August Jack Khahtsahlano was a Squamish medicine man, and was instrumental in the recording of his people's oral history and worked closely with many of Vancouver's first settlers. His talks with J.S. Matthews, the first City Archivist of Vancouver, are transcribed in "Conversations with Khahtsahlano", 1932–1954, and are now available to read online. They discussed "everything from area history, legends, and traditions like the Potlatch, to food preparations and plants for medicine". These records were designed to follow the work of Oliver Wells, with whom August Jack had also collaborated to record his personal stories and history in the book Squamish Legends... The First People (1966), published by Oliver Wells and Domanic Charlie, who operated a cafe in North Vancouver and displayed August Jack's carvings.

Part of the Vancouver neighbourhood that is now known as Kitsilano, was once a village named Senakw. The name Kitsilano is an Anglicization of Khatsahlano's name, and was appropriated for this use by the Canadian Pacific Railway when it developed the neighbourhood known by that name. A high school, Kitsilano Secondary School, and the Khatsahlano Music + Arts Festival, held in Vancouver, also use his name.
