= Harriet Nahanee =

Canadian activist

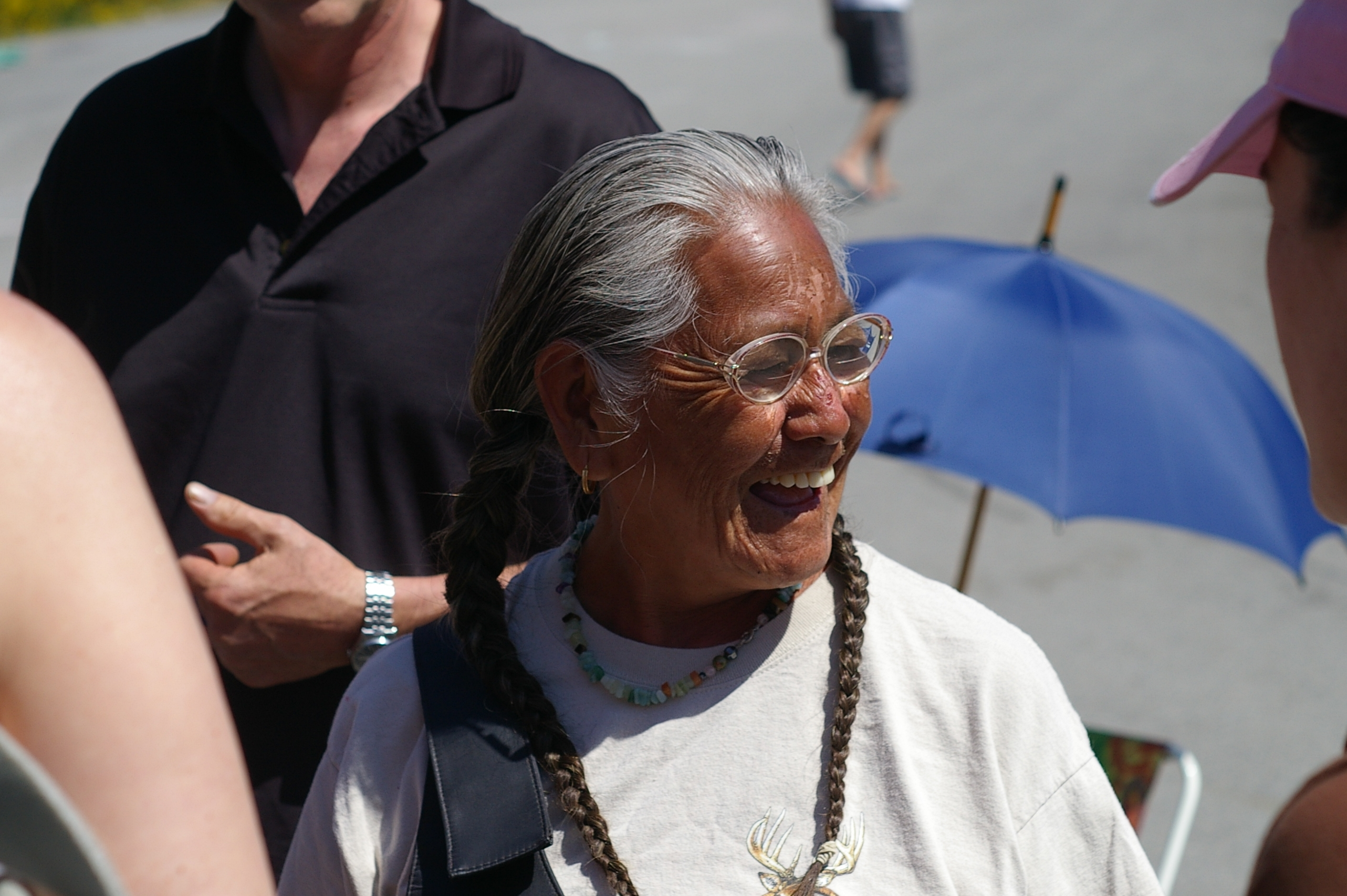
Harriet Nahanee at Eagleridge Bluffs

Harriet Nahanee also known as Tseybayotl-t (December 7, 1935 – February 24, 2007) was an indigenous rights activist, residential school alumna, and environmental activist. She was born in British Columbia, Canada. She comes from the Pacheedaht who are part of the Nuu-chah-nulth, Indigenous peoples from the Vancouver Island. As a child, Nahanee attended both Ahousaht Residential School and Alberni Residential School, and would later testify about the horrible treatment she received there. She married into the Squamish (Sḵwxwú7mesh).

Harriet was sentenced to two weeks in a provincial jail in January 2007 for criminal contempt of court for her part in the Sea-to-Sky Highway expansion protest at Eagleridge Bluffs. She was then hospitalized with pneumonia a week after her release from the jail, at which time doctors discovered she had lung cancer. She died of pneumonia and complications at St. Paul's Hospital in Vancouver on February 24, 2007, one month after her original sentencing.

Nahanee had been weak from the flu and asthma in January, and it was widely suspected that Nahanee's condition worsened during her incarceration at the Surrey Pre-Trial Centre. An independent public inquiry into her death was called for in the Legislative Assembly of British Columbia on March 5. Solicitor-General John Les said the provincial government expressed regret for the passing but denied any government responsibility and refused opposition requests for an inquiry.

== Quotes ==
What I would like to see is people with [traditional] knowledge to teach the small, little people how to grow up with pride. This generation is lost. My generation is lost − they're assimilated. They don't think like an Indian. What I'd like to see is our five-year-olds being taught their language, their songs, their games, their spirituality, their Indian, eh, their Indian-ness. I'd like to ask all the people out there to reclaim their culture − practice it, teach the children, and let's reclaim our backbone, our culture and put some pride in our children.

== See also ==
- Notable Aboriginal people of Canada
- Squamish people
- Nuu-chah-nulth
- Residential School
