= Ian Campbell (Canadian politician) =

Canadian politician

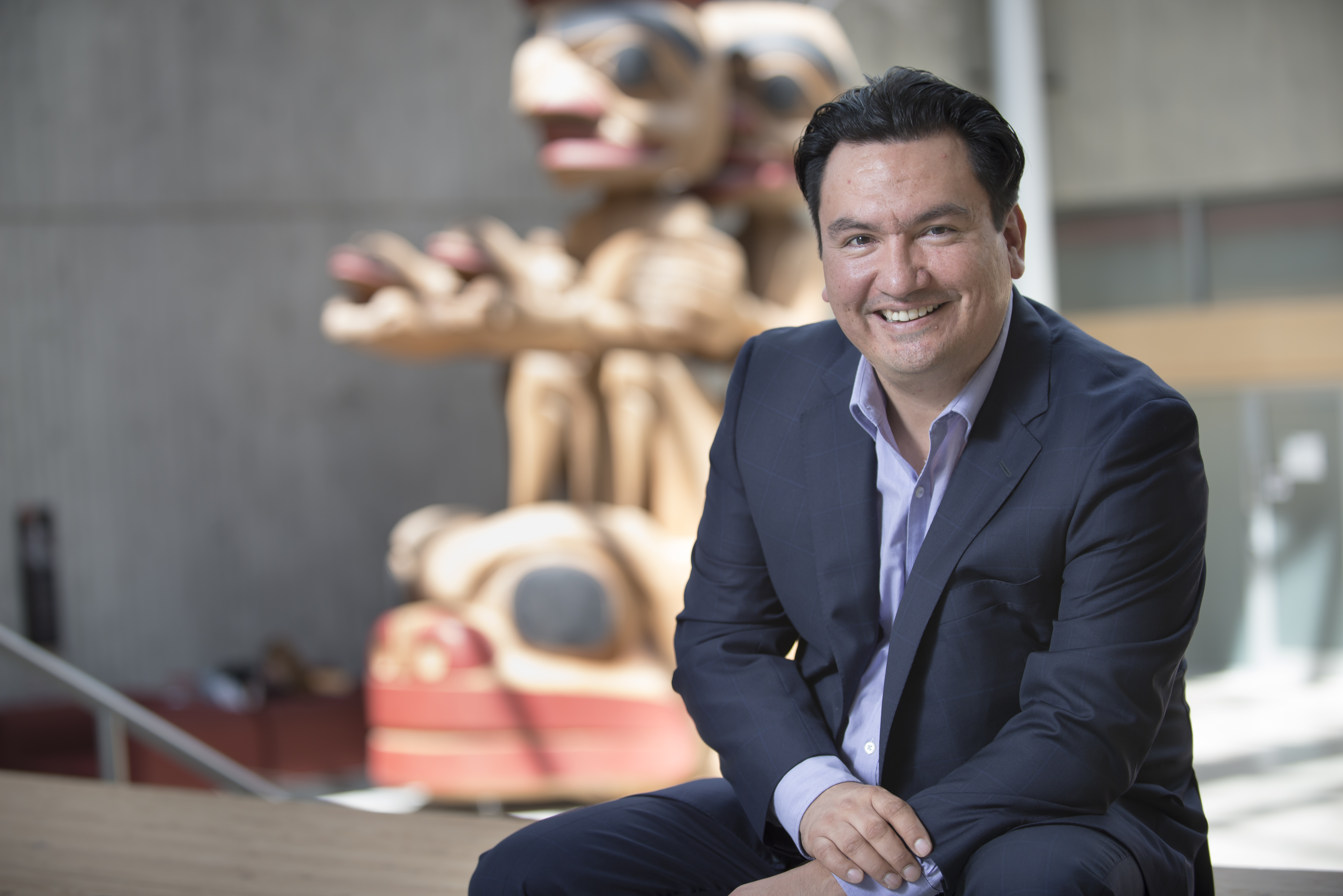
Campbell in 2015

Ian Campbell (born 1974 or 1975) is an Indigenous Canadian politician. He is one of many hereditary chiefs, also known as head of family, and an elected councillor of the Squamish Nation. He serves as the chair of the Indigenous Partnerships Success Showcase, a business conference focused on economic reconciliation and partnerships between industry and Indigenous community. The event takes place annually in Vancouver, British Columbia. Campbell also serves on the board of MST Development Corporation (MST), a corporate entity which manages real estate properties owned by a partnership between the Musqueam Indian Band, the Squamish Nation, and the Tsleil-Waututh Nation. In 2018, he became the Vision Vancouver mayoral candidate for the 2018 Vancouver municipal election, but withdrew before the election.

== Life and political career ==
Campbell is a member of the Squamish Nation. He lives in North Vancouver, British Columbia.

In the years leading up to the Vancouver 2010 Winter Olympics, Campbell was involved in the negotiations for First Nation governments participation in the games, as the Four Host First Nations.

In July 2010, Campbell, along with other First Nation leaders, called for Stanley Park to be renamed X̱wáýx̱way, a historic aboriginal name for the area.

In 2014, Campbell was a founding member of MST, participating in negotiations between the Musqueam Indian Band, the Squamish Nation, and the Tsleil-Waututh Nation for joint management of real estate on lands over which the First Nations groups had overlapping claims in the British Columbia Treaty Process. Based on the corporation's own estimates, MST's properties are valued at more than $1 billion.

In 2015, Campbell was one of the first graduates of the Simon Fraser University MBA in Aboriginal Business and Leadership.

As a hereditary chief of the Squamish Nation, Campbell has supported the proposed Woodfibre LNG project, subject to certain conditions. He has opposed the Trans Mountain Pipeline. He was chief when the nation filed a court challenge against the pipeline.

In October 2017, Campbell proposed tearing down the Fairmont Academy, a former Royal Canadian Mounted Police (RCMP) barracks. He claimed doing so would assist the reconciliation process, citing the historic "marginalization of Indigenous peoples" by the RCMP.

In May 2018, Campbell announced that he intended to run for mayor of Vancouver in the 2018 election. Shortly after his announcement, he was confirmed as the Vision Vancouver mayoral candidate, replacing Gregor Robertson, who is not seeking re-election. Campbell campaigned on the promise of expanding the Broadway Skytrain extension to the University of British Columbia. On September 10, several days before the deadline to file necessary paperwork with Elections BC, Campbell announced that he would be withdrawing from the race.

In 2022, Campbell became the chair of the Indigenous Partnerships Success Showcase. Campbell said the annual event provides a platform to advance economic reconciliation and "showcase[s] to broad audiences the progress that has already been made".
