= Kitsilano Secondary School =

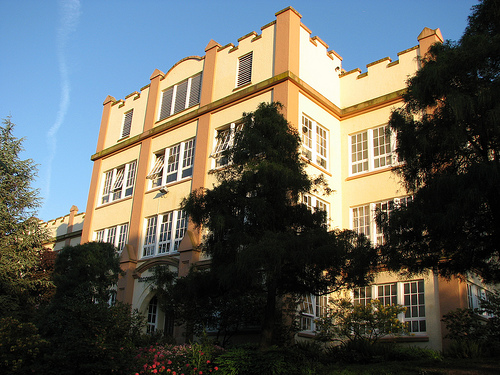

Location
- 2706 Trafalgar Street; Vancouver, British Columbia, V6K 2J6; Canada; 49°15′45″N 123°9′49″W

Information
- School type: Public Secondary School
- Motto: Latin: Fiat Lux (Let There Be Light)
- Founded: 1917
- School board: School District 39 Vancouver
- Superintendent: Helen McGregor
- Director: Rick Lopez (Director of Instruction)
- Principal: Benita Kwon
- Principal: Vice Principal Mr Godfrey
- Staff: 121
- Grades: 8-12
- Enrollment: 1609 (December 2024)
- Language: English, French
- Hours in school day: 6 hours and 30 minutes
- Colours: Royal Blue and Gold
- Mascot: None (originally Demons)
- Team name: none
- Newspaper: The Demon
- Website: go.vsb.bc.ca/schools/kitsilano/Pages/default.aspx

Kitsilano Secondary School is the public secondary school in the Kitsilano neighborhood of Vancouver, British Columbia, Canada. The school has several district programs including French immersion and on-site pre-employment. Advanced Placement courses are also offered.

== The School ==
The first students selected royal blue and gold as the school colours, based on those of the University of Aberdeen (the Alma Mater of one of their teachers); the first Latin classes chose "Fiat Lux" (Let there be light) as the school motto. The original school crest was designed by Mr. S. P. Judge, the first art teacher at Kitsilano, and although the crest has undergone some slight changes over the decades, it still displays the original colours and motto.

The school is known for the numerous television and film productions which have been filmed there; Disturbing Behavior, Big Bully, Anything for Love, The Santa Claus 2, 21 Jump Street, and Party of Five used the school as a filming location. The school also counts a number of former alumni who went on to careers in film and television, most notably Ryan Reynolds and Joshua Jackson.

The main foyer is home to a portrait of Chief August Jack Khahtsahlano, the school's namesake. The auditorium houses a Tanu totem pole, carved by Don Yeomans in 1986 in honour of Vancouver's centennial anniversary.

== Sports ==
Kitsilano won provincial basketball championships in 1997, was the City and District Champions, went to the Provincial Finals in 1977, and won the HSBC Vancouver basketball tournament in 2007. The Kitsilano cheerleading team went to the world championships held at the ESPN World Wide Sports Centre in Florida in 2017 and 2018.

Concluding the 2020-2021 school year, the Kitsilano Athletics department shifted away from the "Blue Demon" name and logo toward a culturally appropriate new name and logo.

== History and facilities ==
Kitsilano Secondary School was founded in 1917, when overflow classes from King Edward High School were moved to Cecil Rhodes School. The first temporary wooden structures for the new school were built in 1920 at Trafalgar and 12th Avenue. The current building was designed by Vancouver VSB staff architect Frank A.A. Barrs and opened in 1927. In 1958, a Modernist-style addition designed by school architect Allan B. Wilson was added to the south side of the original building. In 1973 a single-storey concrete structure was added on the southeast corner of the site.

In 2010, the school board approved a concept plan for the seismic upgrades to the facility. In October 2011, the provincial government announced a $57.8 million restoration project that will include seismic upgrades and new construction meeting Leadership in Energy and Environmental Design (LEED) Gold Standards. In 2012, three design-build partners, each comprising a general contractor and an architectural firm, were shortlisted for the project. In August 2013, it was announced that the Bouygues Building Canada team was selected to design and build the renovation and expansion.

Construction began on the southeast corner in 2014. This involved the removal of the tennis and volleyball courts. The new academic wing was completed in the summer of 2015, and the school's renovations were finished by fall 2017.

== Notable alumni ==
- Julian Clarke, film editor, specifically nominated for a Academy Award for his role editing the movie District 9
- Kathleen Heddle, Olympic rower, 3-time Gold medallist
- Josh Holmes, Video game designer
- Joshua Jackson, actor
- Levon Kendall, professional basketball player
- Fred Latremouille, radio personality and actor
- Boris Malagurski, film director, producer, writer, political commentator, and television host
- Mary Stewart, Olympic swimmer, named Canada’s top female athlete of 1961.
- Justin Mensah-Coker, professional rugby player, currently playing with Plymouth Albion R.F.C. (UK)
- Roy Peterson, award winning cartoonist.
- Ryan Reynolds, television/movie star, entrepreneur, and filmmaker.
