= X̱wáýx̱way =

Village site

Coordinates: 49.3026°N 123.1305°W

X̱wáýx̱way (Squamish: [χʷajχʷaj]) or x̌ʷay̓x̌ʷəy̓ (Halkomelem: [χʷajˀχʷəjˀ]), rendered in English as Xway xway and Whoiwhoi, is a First Nations village site, located in what is now Stanley Park in Vancouver, British Columbia, Canada. The village was located on the eastern peninsula of the park, near what is now Lumberman's Arch. The village was home for many Squamish, Musqueam and Tsleil-waututh people, but after European colonization began in the Vancouver area, the inhabitants were forced to re-locate to nearby villages. The village was named for a mask ceremony; thus, the best translation of x̱wáýx̱way would be 'masked dance performance'.

== History ==
X̱wáýx̱way is estimated to have been inhabited for more than 3000 years. It was one of many villages on the shores of Burrard Inlet around present-day Vancouver. The abundant resources in these lands were used by Squamish, Musqueam, and Tsleil-waututh peoples. X̱wáýx̱way was one of the prominent villages in the area, hosting many houses; each was occupied by a large extended family.

By the late 1800s, X̱wáýx̱way was the largest settlement in what is now Stanley Park. In the village, a big house or longhouse measured at 60 metres long and near 20 metres wide (197 ft × 66 ft). The structure was built with large cedar posts and slabs. 11 families lived in the house, numbering around 100 people. A large potlatch, a ceremonial event conducted by wealthy families, was held at this house in 1875. This event is also mentioned in the city council meeting minutes, where the medical health officer recommended the destruction of the buildings because of a smallpox outbreak, says Eric McLay, president of the Archaeological Society of British Columbia.

With colonial British expansion from the east following the opening of the transcontinental railroad in 1886, Vancouver started to boom in population. What is now Stanley Park was made a military reservation in 1859. The native inhabitants of Vancouver, including those living in X̱wáýx̱way and nearby Sen̓áḵw, were seen as an impediment to development, and were removed to reserves. This process was facilitated by the passage of the Indian Act in 1876. In the 1880s, surveyors and road builders demolished X̱wáýx̱way to create the Park Drive perimeter road. In a 1934 conversation with archivist Major J.S. Matthews, August Jack Khatsahlano related to his childhood when he lived in the area. "We was inside this house when the surveyors come along and they chop the corner of our house when we was eating inside... We all get up and go outside see what was the matter. My sister Louise, she was only one talk a little English; she goes out ask Whiteman what's he doing that for. The man say, 'We're surveying the road. My sister ask him, "'Whose road?".

Local anthropologist Charles Hill-Tout noted several skeletons were found during an excavation near X̱wáýx̱way. In the Sḵwx̱wú7mesh tradition, the deceased were placed in specially made bentwood boxes, and placed high in trees. Some individuals or families of high social standing would be placed in cedar dugout canoes.

Squamish Nation chief Ian Cambell proposed in 2010 that Stanley Park be renamed Xwayxway Park after the name of this village.

== See also ==
- August Jack Khatsahlano
- List of Squamish villages
