= X̱wemelch'stn =

First Nations reserve in British Columbia

Coordinates: 49°19′00″N 123°08′00″W

X̱wemelch'stn [χʷəməltʃʼstn], usually anglicized as Homulchesan, is a large community of Squamish Nation, part of the Coast Salish ethnic and linguistic group. The name X̱wemelch'stn, translates to "Fast Moving Water of Fish", relating to the Capilano River. The village is one of the oldest and major villages of the Squamish and continues to be so, being Squamish Nation's most populated reserve. The community is also known as the Capilano Indian Reserve, formally Capilano Indian Reserve No. 5, and is named like the adjacent Capilano River after the Capilano chieftaincy, the best-known Joe Capilano. The name Kiapila'noq means "people of Kiap", and was the title of the supreme chief of the Sḵwx̱wú7mesh in the area of English Bay. Chief George Capilano was the chief who met Captain Vancouver at X̱wemelch'stn in 1792, and had met Captain Cook in 1782.

== Population and Services ==
The community to date hold more than 502 houses, along with the newly named Chief Joe Mathias Centre, the "Li'l Ones School", the Squamish Nation Youth Centre, as well as many small businesses.

== History ==
X̱wemelch'stn first entered recorded history at the time of the voyage of Captain George Vancouver, when it and neighboring X̱wáýx̱way, across the inlet on the eastern peninsula of what is now Stanley Park, otherwise known as Lumberman's Arch, became recorded in the Captain's journals. At the time it was a palisaded village and one of the largest Sḵwxwú7mesh villages in the Burrard Inlet.

== Developments ==
The Capilano Reserve is the site of major commercial and residential developments, mostly on the West Vancouver side of its area. These include the Park Royal Shopping Centre and associated apartment buildings, and a small office tower adjacent to the intersection of Taylor Way, and a large recreational vehicle park more or less beneath the northern end of the Lions Gate Bridge (the highway interchange for the bridge is also on reserve land). Foreshore properties along Vancouver Harbour leased from reserve lands include bulk terminals and other port facilities. Revenues from all these arrangements are part of band finances.

== See also ==
- Joe Capilano
- Squamish language
- List of Squamish villages
