= Sen̓áḵw =

Squamish Nation site in Vancouver

Outline of Sen̓áḵw (red), in the Kitsilano neighbourhood of Vancouver

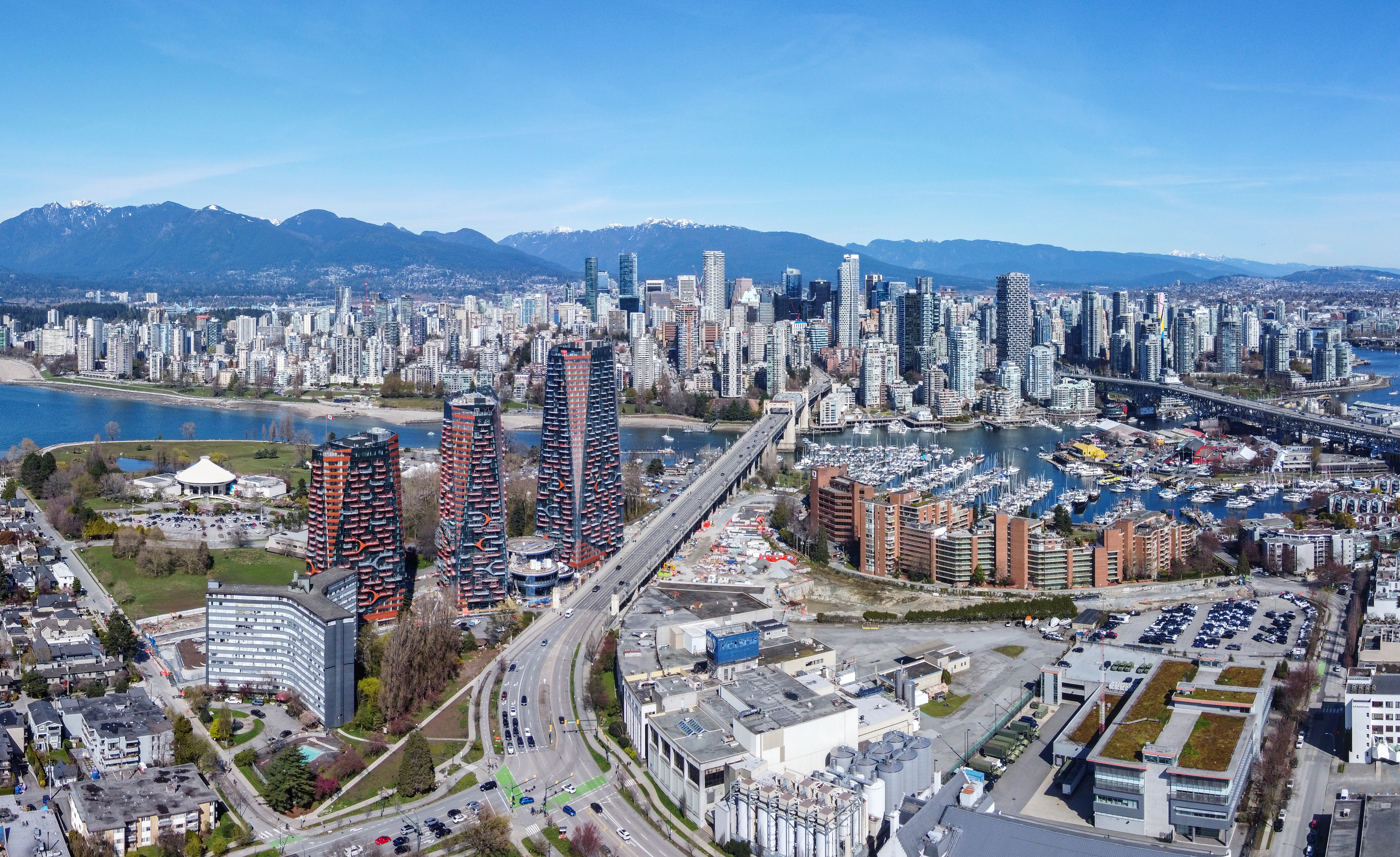
Sen̓áḵw aerial view in April, 2026

Sen̓áḵw (Squamish: Sen̓áḵw [sən̰ˈaqʷ], literally 'the place inside the head of False Creek'; Halkomelem: sən̓aʔqʷ) is an area located in Vancouver in the Canadian province of British Columbia. It lies on the south side of False Creek, covering lands near present-day Vanier Park and Squamish Nation's Kitsilano First Nations Reserve No. 6.

Historically home to the Squamish people (Sḵwx̱wú7mesh), Sen̓áḵw holds significant cultural and historical importance for Coast Salish peoples. Over time, the community faced forced relocation, land expropriation, and prolonged legal disputes. In the early 2000s, the Squamish Nation regained a portion of Sen̓áḵw, paving the way for a large-scale redevelopment project launched in 2019. The area was also the birthplace of prominent Squamish siy̓ám̓ ('chief') August Jack Khatsahlano, widely recognized for documenting local Indigenous history.

Many present-day Squamish families are descendants of those who once lived at Sen̓áḵw. The area was officially designated as a First Nations reserve in 1869 by colonial authorities, then expanded to 80 acres (32 ha) by the Joint Reserve Commission in 1877, referred to as the Kitsilano Indian Reserve. Following intense settler-driven land demands, the village was illegally sold and largely destroyed in 1913. Decades of legal challenges culminated in a 2001 court settlement that restored 11.7 acres (4.7 ha) to Squamish Nation control.

== History ==
=== Early settlement and cultural significance ===
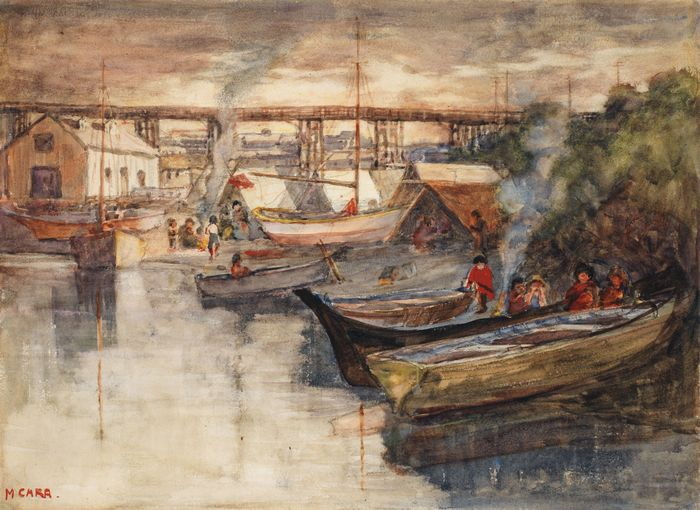
Indian Encampment by Emily Carr, a c. 1908 painting depicting Sen̓áḵw

Sen̓áḵw was originally a seasonal village site of the Squamish people at the head of False Creek, which offered abundant resources such as cedar, salmon, and shellfish. Coast Salish nations, including the Musqueam, also used the area for seasonal harvesting, potlatches, and trade. No permanent structures existed until the mid-19th century, when some Squamish families moved from the upper Squamish River valley to establish permanent homes. Though the Musqueam also visited, historical records indicate they did not settle there permanently.

=== Reserve designation (1860s–1870s) ===
Following the passage of the Indian Act in 1876, the Joint Indian Reserve Commission began surveying Indigenous lands. In 1869, a colonial survey recognized an Indigenous village at the south shore of False Creek, referred to as the Kitsilano (False Creek) Reserve. By 1877, the Commission had formally designated 80 acres (32 ha) as "Kitsilano Indian Reserve No. 6", thereby restricting the Squamish people's use of their ancestral lands.

A petition in 1868 from 42 residents (14 men, 16 women, 12 children) spurred the 1869 survey that confirmed the site's reserve status. Chief George ("Chepx̱ím”) was recorded as the local leader. Historical censuses document 40–50 residents (sometimes up to 57), chiefly Squamish families, who sustained themselves through fishing, resource harvesting, and employment in Vancouver.

=== Population and everyday life ===
Between the 1870s and 1916, Sen̓áḵw functioned as a cohesive settlement primarily inhabited by Squamish families. Residents lived in several dwellings, including a large community house owned by Chief George. While some individuals had Musqueam heritage, they typically resided at Sen̓áḵw through marital or familial connections, reinforcing the village's predominantly Squamish identity.

=== Expropriation and urban expansion ===
As Vancouver expanded, local authorities increasingly viewed Sen̓áḵw as an obstacle to development. Portions of the reserve were expropriated in 1886 and 1902 for railway infrastructure. By 1903, Vancouver Mayor Thomas Neelands proposed repurposing the reserve for civic amenities such as courthouses and fairgrounds, and land speculation in the Kitsilano area—named after the Squamish Chief Xats’alánexw—intensified settler interest in dispossession.

=== Forced dispossession and destruction (1913–1916) ===
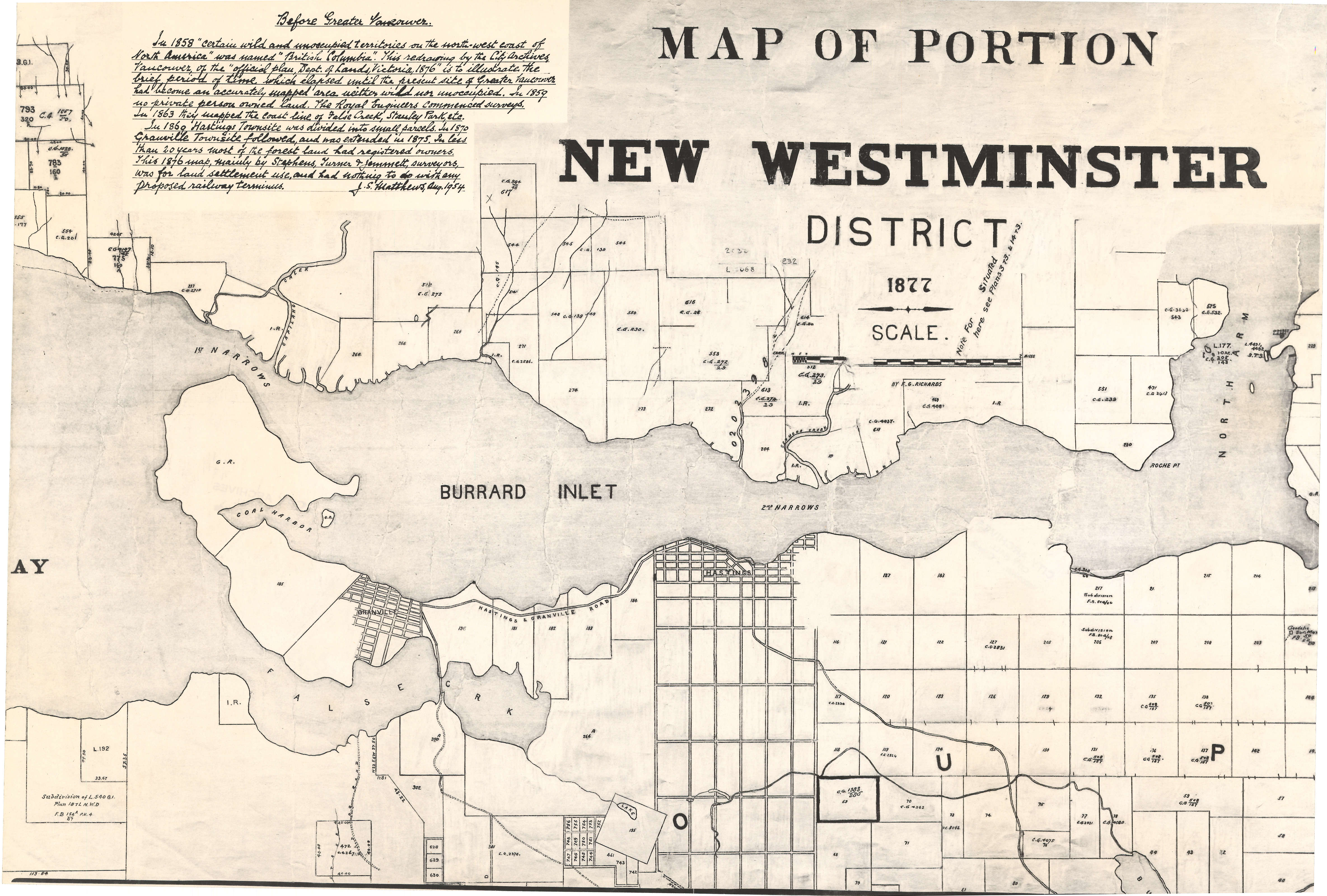
Map of New Westminster District, 1877. "I.R." marks Sen̓áḵw at the head of False Creek.

In 1913, the Attorney General of British Columbia orchestrated an illegal sale of Sen̓áḵw lands. Twenty Squamish men were coerced into accepting $11,250 each under the threat of receiving nothing, contravening federal laws that prohibited private sales of reserve land without proper authorization. Although the federal government never endorsed this transaction, most Squamish residents were compelled to leave. Settlers looted and burned the vacated homes as onlookers observed what local newspapers called "Indians Moving Day".

In 1916, the Vancouver Harbour Commission expropriated the area under the McKenna–McBride Royal Commission's Interim Report, clearing any remaining families or structures. A subsequent provincial inquiry in 1916 examined whether Attorney General William John Bowser's associates profited from the sale but ultimately defended the transaction as serving the "public interest".

=== Aftermath and legal struggles ===
For decades after 1916, the expropriated land remained largely undeveloped, used for industrial dumping or squatting. In 1977, Squamish Nation initiated legal action, alleging the federal government had breached its fiduciary obligation to protect the land.

==== Mathias v. Canada ====
Mathias v. Canada arose from these disputes over Kitsilano (False Creek) Indian Reserve No. 6—referred to by the Squamish as Sen̓áḵw—and the 1913 sale that was widely recognized as illegal. Squamish leaders, including Chief Joe Mathias, contended that the Crown had failed its fiduciary duties under the Indian Act by permitting or facilitating the forced sale.

Central legal issues included:

- Fiduciary duty: The Squamish argued that Canada owed a fiduciary responsibility to safeguard their reserve interests.
- Validity of the 1913 sale: They maintained that the sale contravened the Indian Act, noting the exclusion of women from decision-making.
- Damages and land return: The Nation sought recognition of the 1913 sale's illegality, along with financial compensation and restoration of the reserve.

Although parts of the case reached the federal court, a negotiated settlement was achieved in June 2000 before a final judicial decision. The settlement included financial compensation and returned 11.7 acres (4.7 ha) of the original 80-acre reserve to the Squamish Nation. This agreement laid the groundwork for the modern Sen̓áḵw Development announced in 2019, aimed at building thousands of housing units on the reclaimed land.

== Modern redevelopment ==
=== Commercial development plans ===
In 2019, Squamish Nation unveiled plans to build a large housing project on the returned lands near the south end of the Burrard Street Bridge. Initially proposed at 3,000 units, the plan was later expanded to 6,000 purpose-built rental apartments. Some buildings will reach 56 storeys, exempt from local height restrictions.

The project includes 886 vehicle parking spaces, 4,477 bicycle stalls, and a new transit hub at the south end of Burrard Bridge. On September 6, 2022, Prime Minister Justin Trudeau announced a CA$1.4 billion federal loan to fund the first two phases of the project.

In June 2026, floor plans and asking rental prices for 3- and 4-bedroom units in the Phase 1 towers were posted online, prompting a backlash over "what looks to be well over market pricing," including an asking price of $9,070/month for a 1,290 square feet (120 m^{2}) 3-bedroom apartment.

=== Construction progress ===
By March 2024, the project's official website confirmed a four-phase construction timeline, targeting occupancy from 2025 to 2030. At completion, the development will include at least 6,000 rental homes, 1,200 of which will be designated affordable, with a total of 4,000,000 square feet (370,000 m^{2}) of floor space; approximately 45,000 square feet (4,200 m^{2}) will be built using mass timber.

Construction of the first phase began in September 2022, following Trudeau's funding announcement, and features three towers:

- Tower 3: The tallest in Phase 1 at 370 feet (39 storeys). By July 2024, its structure had reached the 17th floor, with installation of a glass facade and round-shaped balconies in progress.
- Tower 2: Rising to 297 feet (31 storeys), it had reached the ninth floor by July 2024.
- Tower 1: The southernmost tower at 291 feet (26 storeys); it had reached the fifth floor by July 2024.

This initial phase spans roughly one million square feet, offering 1,408 secured rental homes, over 34,000 square feet of commercial and restaurant space, and a 25,000-square-foot underground district energy plant operated by Creative Energy, which uses recovered heat from Metro Vancouver's trunk sewer.

By early 2025, all three Phase One towers had reached their full heights. Tower 1 was expected to welcome its first residents by late 2025 or early 2026, with Towers 2 and 3 following by the end of 2026. Together, the three towers will add about 1,400 rental homes, including nearly 300 affordable units.

In August 2025, developer Westbank Corp. sold its entire ownership stake in Phases One and Two to OPTrust, one of Canada's largest pension funds. Under the restructured partnership, OPTrust and the Squamish Nation each hold a 50% interest in those phases; the Nation will hold 100% ownership of Phases Three and Four. Nch'ḵay̓ Development Corporation, the Squamish Nation's economic development arm, said the change reflected the Nation's goal of building the capacity to develop real estate independently. Excavation work on Phase Two, on the east side of the Burrard Street Bridge, was expected to resume in the fall of 2025.

In February 2026, applications opened for rent-assisted homes set aside for Squamish Nation members, followed in March by applications for below-market rental units. Under the project's four-phase timeline, Phase Two is expected to be completed by 2027–2028, Phase Three by 2029–2030, and Phase Four by 2032–2033. The tallest tower, Tower 9 in Phase Three, will reach 560 feet (58 storeys) and contain over 900 rental homes.

== See also ==
- Squamish history
- List of Squamish villages
