= List of beaches in Canada =

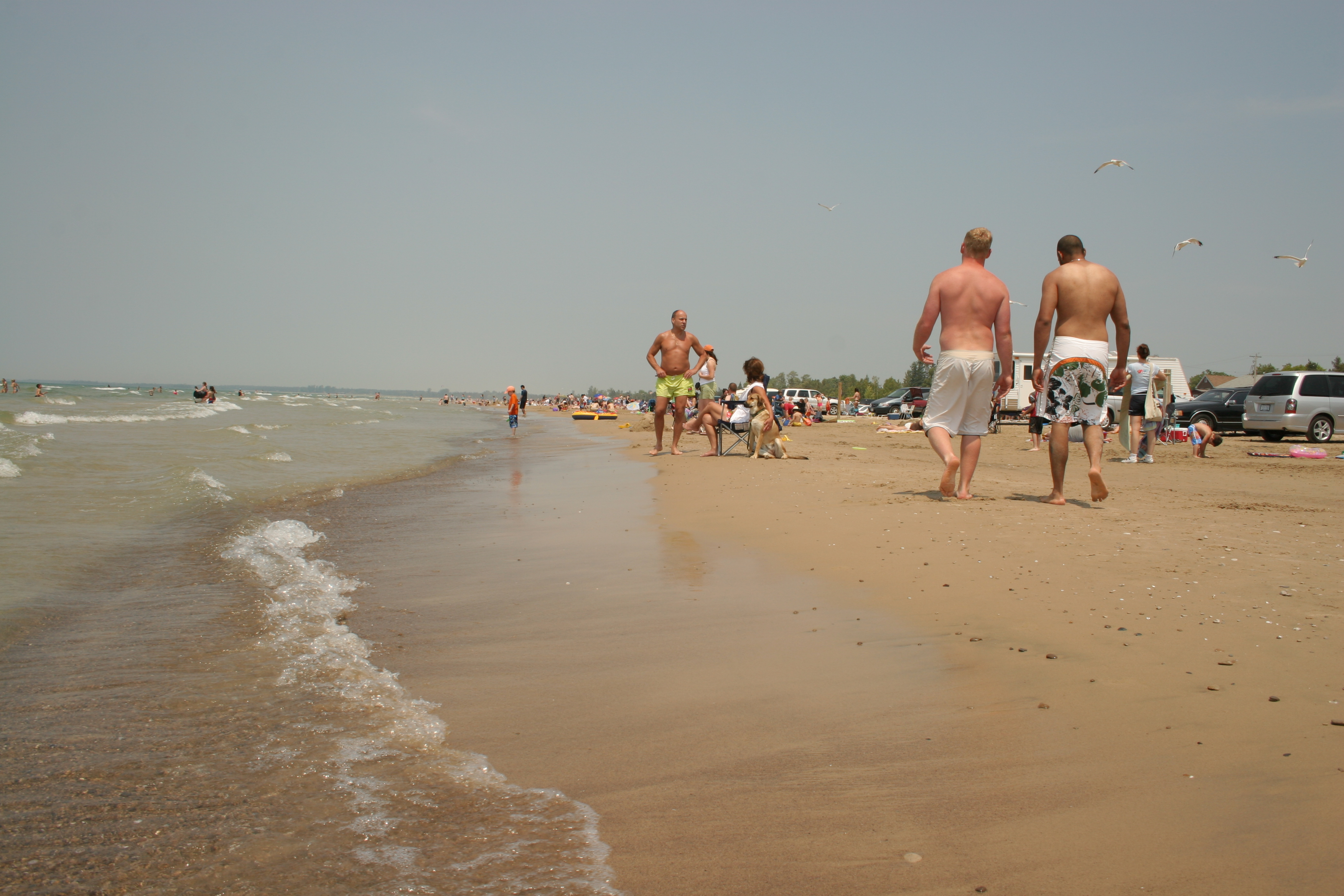
Sauble Beach in Ontario

This is a list of beaches by province or territory in Canada.

== British Columbia ==
- Crescent Beach
- English Bay (Vancouver) (including Sunset Beach, Second Beach and Third Beach)
- Jericho Beach
- Kitsilano, Vancouver
- Locarno Beach, Vancouver
- Long Beach, Pacific Rim
- Parksville
- Saltspring Island
- Qualicum Beach, Qualicum Beach
- Rathtrevor Beach Provincial Park, Parksville
- Spanish Bank, Vancouver
- White Rock Beach
- Wreck Beach, including Acadia Beach and Tower Beach, Vancouver

== Manitoba ==
- Grand Beach
- Hillside Beach Manitoba
- Victoria Beach Manitoba

== New Brunswick ==
- Parlee Beach, Shediac, New Brunswick
- New River Beach Provincial Park
- Aboiteau Beach, Cap-Pelé, New Brunswick
- Kellys Beach, Kouchibouguac National Park
- Callendar's Beach, Kouchibouguac National Park

== Ontario ==
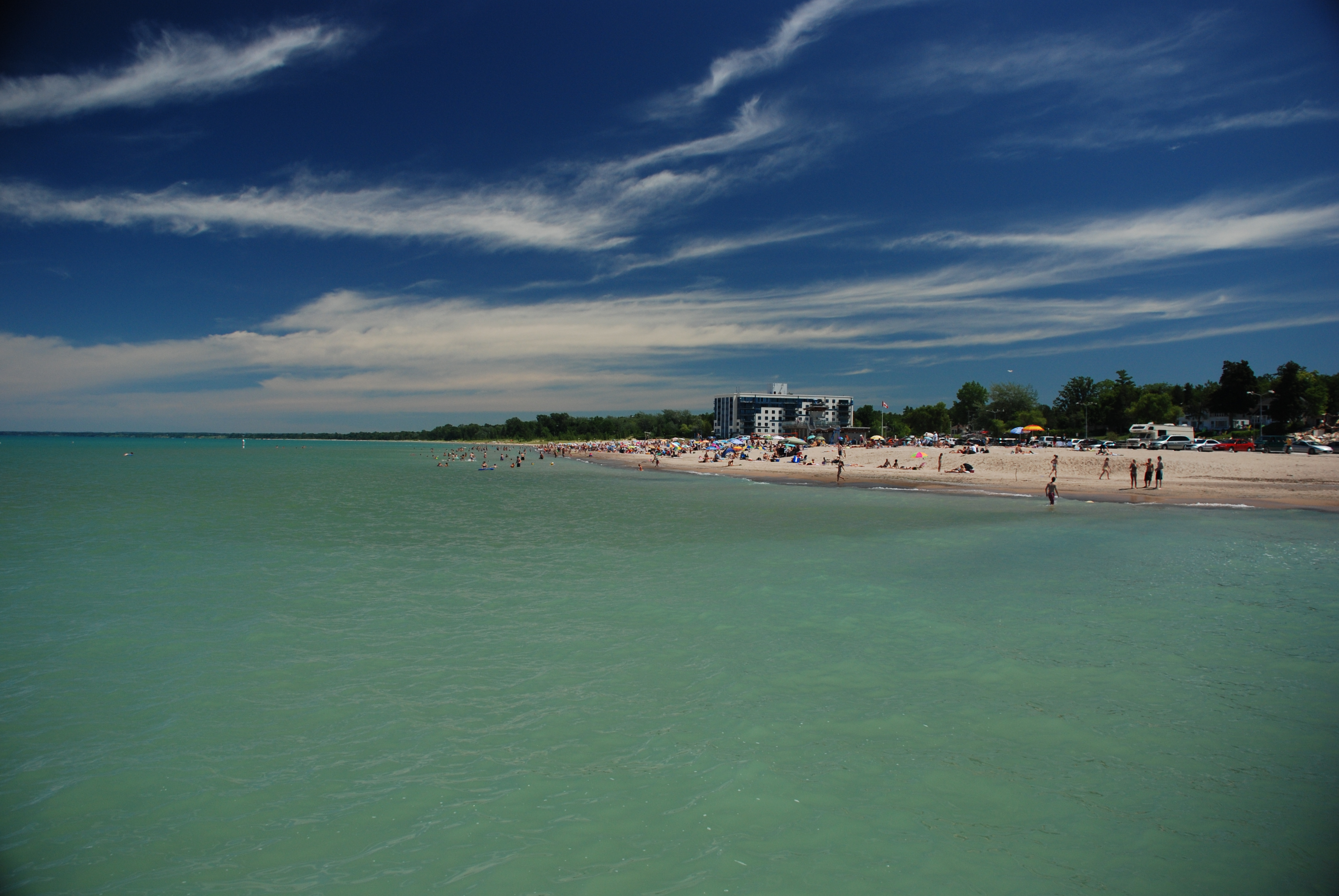
Grand Bend Beach in Southern Ontario

- Borden Lake, Chapleau, Ontario
- Britannia Beach, Ottawa
- Cherry Beach, Toronto
- Crystal Beach
- Grand Bend Beach
- Kew Beach, Toronto
- Port Franks Beach
- Port Stanley Beach
- Sandbanks Beach
- Sauble Beach
- Wasaga Beach
- Port Dover Beach
- Turkey Point Beach

== Prince Edward Island ==
- Cavendish Beach

== See also ==
- List of beaches
