= Bay Challenge =

Annual open water swimming event

The Bay Challenge is an annual open water swimming event from Sandy Cove, West Vancouver to Kitsilano Beach in Vancouver that crosses English Bay. The distance of the current course is approximately 9 kilometers. The changing tides, cold temperatures and rough water make this race particularly challenging. The event is held in the latter part of July every year, when the water temperature is between 16 and 20 degrees Celsius (60-73 degrees Fahrenheit).

Hosted by the Vancouver Open Water Swim Association, the focus is on an inclusive event that allows swimmers of all levels and abilities to participate. The Bay Challenge is open to both solo and relay participants to allow as many people as possible to experience the thrill of the challenge.

== History ==
The inaugural Bay Challenge, originally known as the "Vancouver Sun Swimming Marathon," was designed as a publicity event to celebrate the opening of Kitsilano Pool in 1931. The event was organized by the Vancouver Amateur Swim Club and had 41 registrants – 12 women and 29 men. Of the 41 that originally committed to the race, 33 actually showed up on race day and 20 were reported to have finished. Of those who finished, women came in 2nd, 3rd, and 6th.

The Arthur P. Dawe trophy, sponsored by a local Irish sweepstakes winner, was awarded to the winner Percy Norman. Norman narrowly defeated Miss Roy Clark by 4 minutes in a winning time of 2 hours and 50 minutes.

If the English Bay crossing became an annual event it was not recorded. It was not until 1983 that a crossing event was re-established and the first race won by local swimmer Tom Walker. For two years the route went from Lighthouse Park at Point Atkinson to Spanish Banks. In 1986, a course closer to original route was set. In that year only seven of the twenty competitors completed the swim between the distance shores. The race again was not held for several years. In 1989 a series of open water races was swum but an annual Bay Challenge proved elusive. Finally, the Vancouver Open Water Swim Association was established in 1991 and an enduring annual series has been the result.

In 1993, Percy Norman's family donated the original Arthur P. Dawe cup to the Vancouver Open Water Swim Association and the association has been awarding it ever since to the winner of the annual Bay Challenge.
