= West Point Grey =

Neighbourhood of Vancouver, British Columbia, Canada

- Neighbourhood
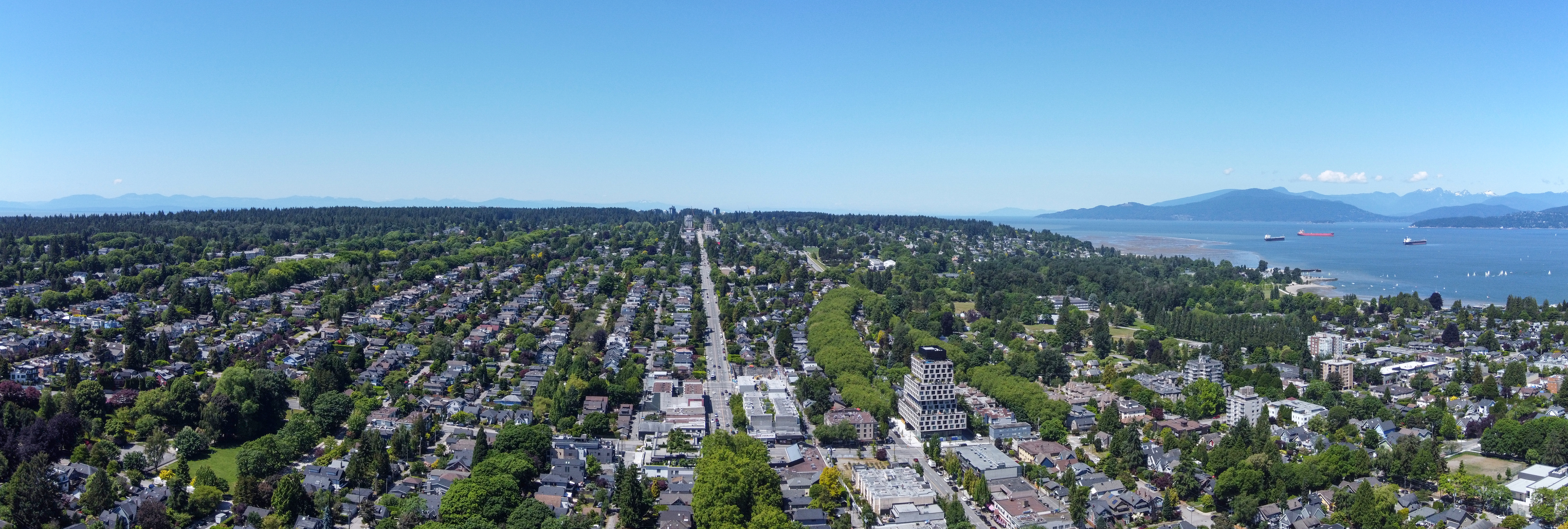
- West Point Grey aerial view in 2026

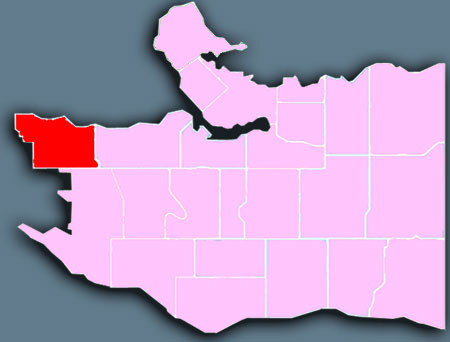
- Location of West Point Grey (in red) in Vancouver

- Location of West Point Grey in Metro Vancouver
- Coordinates: 49°15′52.48″N 123°11′59.08″W
- Country: Canada
- Province: British Columbia
- Regional District: Metro Vancouver
- City: Vancouver

Government
  - Mayor: Ken Sim
  - City Council: Vancouver City Council

Area
  - Land: 4.45 km^{2} (1.72 sq mi)

Population (2016)
  - Total: 13,065
  - Density: 2,935.9/km^{2} (7,604/sq mi)
- Time zone: UTC−08:00 (PST)
  - Summer (DST): UTC−07:00 (PDT)
- Postal code: V6R
- Area codes: 604, 778, 236, 672
- Website: City of Vancouver neighbourhood profile

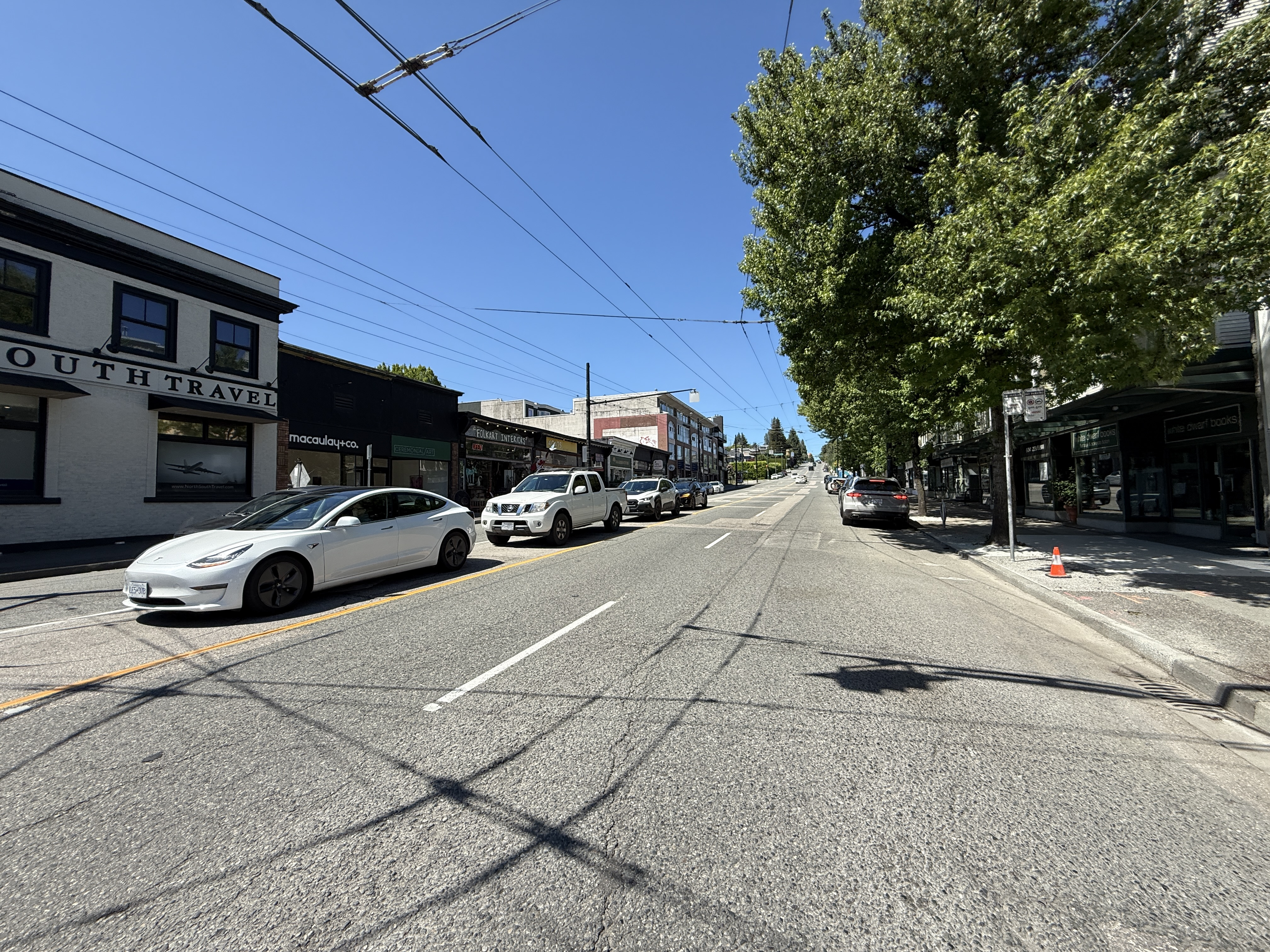
West 10th Avenue at Alma Street in 2026

West Point Grey is a neighbourhood in the northwest of the city of Vancouver, British Columbia, Canada. It is on Point Grey and bordered by 16th Avenue to the south, Alma Street to the east, English Bay to the north, and Blanca Street to the west. Notable beaches within West Point Grey include Spanish Banks, Locarno and Jericho. Immediately to the south is Pacific Spirit Regional Park and to the east is Kitsilano.

The main commercial area with shops and restaurants is along West 10th Avenue between Tolmie Street and Discovery Street. North of West 4th Avenue, the area slopes steeply downhill where it meets English Bay at Locarno Beach and the Spanish Banks.

== Demographics ==
In 2016, West Point Grey had an estimated population of 13,065 of the total 631,485 residents in the City of Vancouver. Its population has remained relatively stable from 2011, when it was 12,795. The 2016 Canadian Census reported a median household income of $84,951 in the neighbourhood, nearly $20,000 higher than the City of Vancouver median income of $65,423. The most common first language in 2016 was English at 63.6 percent, with Chinese second at 18.9 percent. In 2001, English was at 75.1 percent and Chinese second at 9.3 percent.

Panethnic groups in West Point Grey (2001−2016)
Panethnic group	2016		2006		2001	
Panethnic group	Pop.	%	Pop.	%	Pop.	%
European (Note: Statistic includes all persons that did not make up part of a visible minority or an indigenous identity.)	8,090	62.59%	9,865	75.94%	10,340	81.55%
East Asian (Note: Statistic includes total responses of "Chinese", "Korean", and "Japanese" under visible minority section on census.)	3,535	27.35%	2,330	17.94%	1,830	14.43%
South Asian	435	3.37%	280	2.16%	135	1.06%
Middle Eastern (Note: Statistic includes total responses of "West Asian" and "Arab" under visible minority section on census.)	205	1.59%	155	1.19%	20	0.16%
Southeast Asian (Note: Statistic includes total responses of "Filipino" and "Southeast Asian" under visible minority section on census.)	185	1.43%	90	0.69%	130	1.03%
Indigenous	170	1.32%	100	0.77%	70	0.55%
Latin American	130	1.01%	40	0.31%	30	0.24%
African	50	0.39%	15	0.12%	40	0.32%
Other/multiracial (Note: Statistic includes total responses of "Visible minority, n.i.e." and "Multiple visible minorities" under visible minority section on census.)	120	0.93%	105	0.81%	85	0.67%
Total responses	12,925	98.93%	12,990	99.96%	12,680	100%
Total population	13,065	100%	12,995	100%	12,680	100%
Note: Totals greater than 100% due to multiple origin responses

== Education ==
Schools within the West Point Grey Boundary include Lord Byng Secondary School, Our Lady of Perpetual Help, Queen Elizabeth Elementary School, Queen Mary Elementary School, École Jules Quesnel and the private pre-kindergarten to Grade 12 school West Point Grey Academy.

== Jericho Lands ==
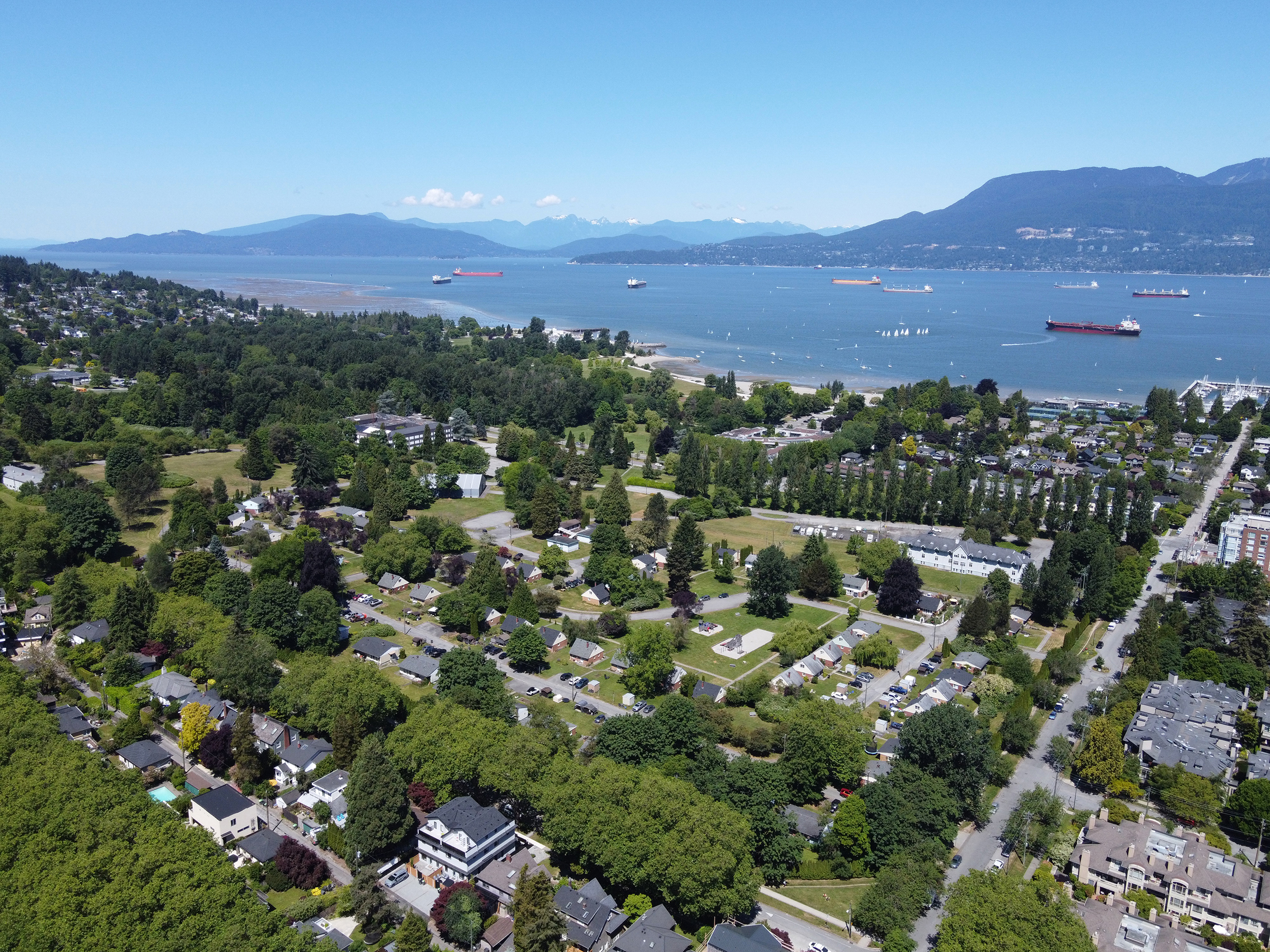
Jericho Lands

West Point Grey is home to the Jericho Lands, composed of two parcels of land with a total area of 36 hectares (90 acres). In a historic agreement in 2014, the larger eastern parcel was acquired by a joint ownership group composed of the Musqueam, Squamish, and Tsleil-Waututh Nations (50%) and Canada Lands Company (50%). In 2016, the same partners acquired the smaller western parcel from the provincial government, in the same proportions. In both acquisitions, the nations acquired almost half of their stake at no charge from the federal and provincial governments. The entire area is slated for redevelopment and initial public engagement began in March 2019 in conjunction with the City of Vancouver.

To the west, the Jericho Hill Grounds is a 15-hectare (38-acre) property formerly owned by the provincial government and houses the West Point Grey Academy private school. The eastern 21-hectare (52-acre) parcel is termed the "Jericho Garrison property" and was previously owned by the Department of Defence. It housed various military branches throughout the 20th century. The 39 Canadian Brigade Group, headquarters for all the Canadian Forces' Army Primary Reserve units in British Columbia, previously had its headquarters in the northeastern section of the neighbourhood, which is home to Vancouver's largest youth hostel.

According to ancient First Nations legend, Point Grey is the "Battleground of the West Wind". The rock representing the god of the West Wind, which is sitting off the point, is called Homolsom. As the rock is sitting between their two territories, Homolsom is half a Squamish word and half a Fraser River language word.

== Festivals ==
Between 1984 and 2023, Fiesta Days, a family oriented carnival, was held annually in June. The event consisted of a parade along 10th Avenue and carnival rides, games, and performances at Trimble Park.
