= Lauchlan Hamilton =

Lauchlan Alexander Hamilton
- Born: September 20, 1852; Penetanguishene, Simcoe County, Province of Canada
- Died: February 11, 1941 (aged 88); Toronto, Ontario, Canada
- Resting place: St. James Cemetery, Toronto
- Occupations: Surveyor, land commissioner
- Employer: Canadian Pacific Railway
- Spouses: Isobel Leask (m. 1880; died 1881); Constance Eaton Bodington (m. 1888)
- Children: Isobel Ogilvie Hamilton

Lauchlan Alexander Hamilton (September 20, 1852 – February 11, 1941) was a Canadian surveyor and land commissioner for the Canadian Pacific Railway (CPR). He is best known for surveying and laying out the original street grid of Vancouver, British Columbia, in 1885–1886, and for serving as an alderman on the city's first two municipal councils. During his approximately twenty-year career with the CPR, Hamilton selected and surveyed townsites for more than fifty settlements across the Canadian prairies, including Calgary, Regina, Moose Jaw, and Medicine Hat.

== Early life and career ==
Hamilton was born on September 20, 1852, in Penetanguishene, Simcoe County, Canada West. His father, William Basil Hamilton (1812–1891), served as the first mayor of Collingwood and as postmaster there for 22 years. Hamilton was educated in Collingwood and trained as a surveyor, qualifying as a Dominion Land Surveyor.

From 1872 to 1874, Hamilton participated in the survey that established the international boundary along the 49th parallel through the prairies. He subsequently served for several years in the office of the Surveyor General of Canada and was placed in charge of Timber, Mining and Grazing Lands in the Department of the Interior.

== CPR land commissioner ==
When the Canadian Pacific Railway was incorporated in 1881, Hamilton was appointed as an assistant land commissioner, eventually rising to general land commissioner, a position he held for approximately twenty years. Under the authority of CPR vice-president William Van Horne, Hamilton was responsible for selecting the 25 million acres (10.1 million hectares) of land the railway had received as a government subsidy and for surveying and laying out townsites along the rail line. As construction progressed westward, Hamilton surveyed townsites and plotted streets for Calgary, Regina, Moose Jaw, Medicine Hat, Swift Current, Maple Creek, Estevan, Saskatoon, and more than fifty other settlements across the prairies.

== Survey of Vancouver ==
=== Arrival and the 1885 survey ===
Hamilton arrived at Burrard Inlet in the autumn of 1885, shortly after the CPR had negotiated with the provincial government for land near Coal Harbour in exchange for relocating the railway terminus from Port Moody. Setting out from the Sunnyside Hotel on Water Street with an eight-man survey team that included his brother-in-law John Leask, Hamilton drove the first survey stake at what would become the corner of Hastings and Hamilton Streets.

Hamilton surveyed the CPR grant from English Bay to Hastings Street, plotting a street grid across terrain his field notebooks described as "cedar swamp," "heavy fir," and "good timber." He used a Ramsden 100-foot chain rather than the standard 66-foot Gunter's chain for the CPR survey areas. The CPR townsite grid joined the earlier Granville townsite at an angle, creating the distinctive offset visible today at Victory Square, where the two grids meet.

=== Street naming ===
Hamilton devised the naming scheme for Vancouver's new streets. He named streets after CPR colleagues—Abbott, Beatty, Cambie, and Hamilton—and after Pacific Coast place names such as Pender, Bute, Jervis, and Pacific. Streets east of Main Street were named after local landowners and directors of the Vancouver Improvement Company, while western streets largely honoured CPR officials.

Hamilton also created the tree-name sequence for the streets of Kitsilano, running alphabetically from Arbutus to Yew, though he later noted that a subordinate disrupted the intended alphabetical order while he was absent, and it was too late to correct. In the summer of 1887, Hamilton canoed across False Creek and determined that a new subdivision on the far shore should be called "Fairview," a name the neighbourhood retains. Together with Van Horne, Hamilton advocated renaming the settlement from "Granville" to "Vancouver," believing the original name sounded too provincial for a major city.

== Municipal career ==
Hamilton was elected as an alderman on Vancouver's first city council in 1886 and re-elected for a second one-year term in 1887, receiving more votes than any other alderman in the second election.

=== Stanley Park ===
Among the first items of business taken up by the new council on May 12, 1886, was a petition to the federal government to lease the 1,000-acre military reserve at the tip of the peninsula for use as a city park. Hamilton surveyed the first road around the park and oversaw its construction. The park was formally dedicated by Governor General Lord Stanley on October 29, 1889, as Stanley Park.

=== Municipal seal ===
Upon Vancouver's incorporation in 1886, Hamilton designed the city's first municipal seal. The pictorial design depicted a tree, a sailing ship, wooden docks, and a train, though it did not conform to the formal rules of heraldry. This seal remained in use until it was replaced in 1903 by a proper coat of arms.

== Later life ==
In 1888, the CPR transferred Hamilton to Winnipeg to replace the railway's land commissioner, John Henry McTavish, who had died. He built a residence at 434 Assiniboine Avenue in 1894, later converted to the Chalet Apartments. In 1899, Hamilton moved to Toronto.

=== Watercolour painting ===
Hamilton was an amateur watercolour painter who produced numerous works depicting Vancouver and British Columbia landscapes during the 1880s. His paintings—including scenes of Victoria, the Fraser River valley, and Harrison Lake—are considered historic records of the province in its early period of European settlement. In 1943, two years after his death, the Vancouver Art Gallery held a solo retrospective exhibition of 29 of his watercolour sketches, on loan from the City of Vancouver Archives through the efforts of city archivist Major J. S. Matthews. His paint kit is preserved in the Matthews collection and was displayed at the Museum of Vancouver in 2016–2017. Several of his paintings are held by the Royal BC Museum.

== See also ==
- Canadian Pacific Railway
- History of Vancouver
- Great Vancouver Fire
- Coat of arms of Vancouver
- Stanley Park
- Constance Hamilton
- William Van Horne
