= Spanish Banks =

Series of beaches in Vancouver, British Columbia, Canada

Coordinates: 49.277°N 123.216°W

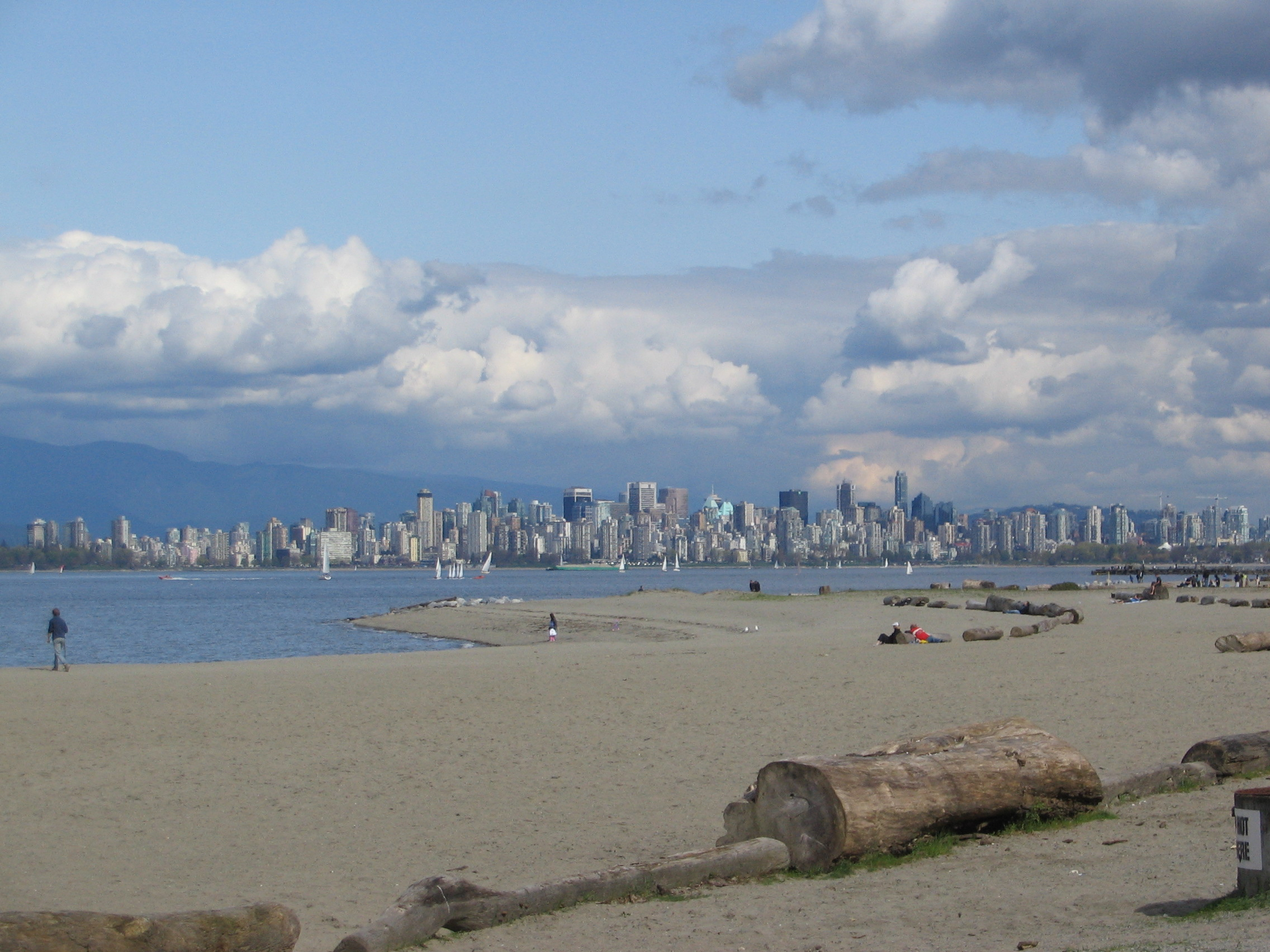
A view of English Bay and Downtown Vancouver from one of the Spanish Banks beaches.

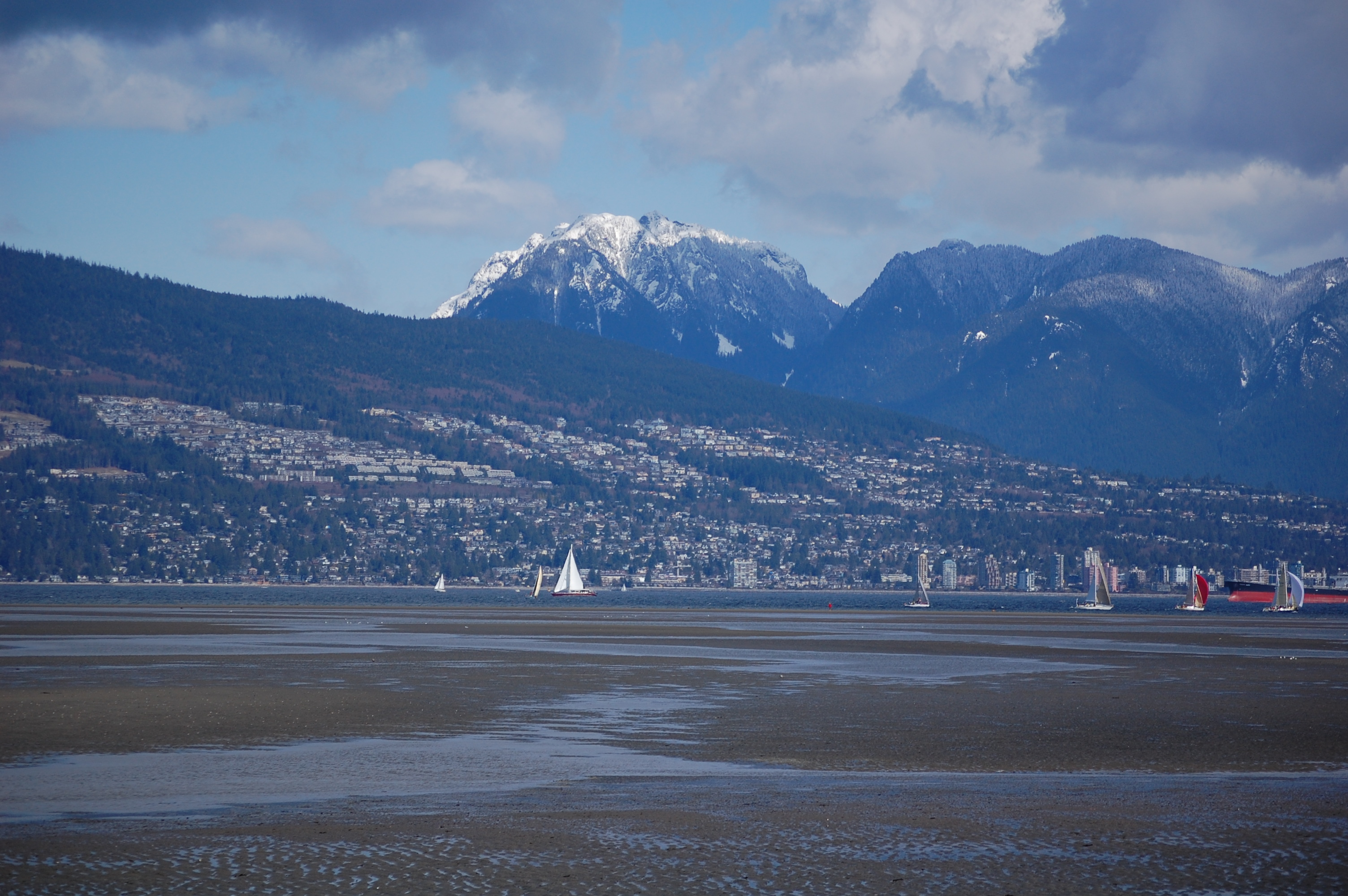
The North Shore over an exceptionally low spring tide.

Spanish Banks (Squamish: P’ékwcha/Pəqʷə́cən, Halkomelem: šxʷsyiΦəm) are a series of beaches in the city of Vancouver, British Columbia, Canada, located along the shores of English Bay in the West Point Grey neighbourhood. Spanish Banks is located between Locarno Beach to the east and the grounds of the University of British Columbia to the west.

== History ==
Although the first European explorers in the Strait of Georgia were the Spaniards Juan Carrasco and José María Narváez, who sighted Point Grey in 1791, the Spanish Banks were named in commemoration of the meeting of the English under George Vancouver and the Spanish under Galiano and Valdés in June 1792. While Vancouver's maps do not show the bank, Galiano's charts of 1792 and 1795 do. The Hudson's Bay Company came to call the area Spanish Banks for these reasons. The name was bestowed upon them by Captain Richards of HMS Plumper during his survey of Burrard Inlet in 1859.

In the late 1920s, Spanish Banks was originally proposed to be the site of Vancouver International Airport (YVR), but was deemed too expensive (as that would require land reclamation), as well as noise pollution (due to the close proximity to downtown Vancouver). Instead, in 1931, the airport was then built on Sea Island where it is located today.

== About Spanish Banks Beaches ==
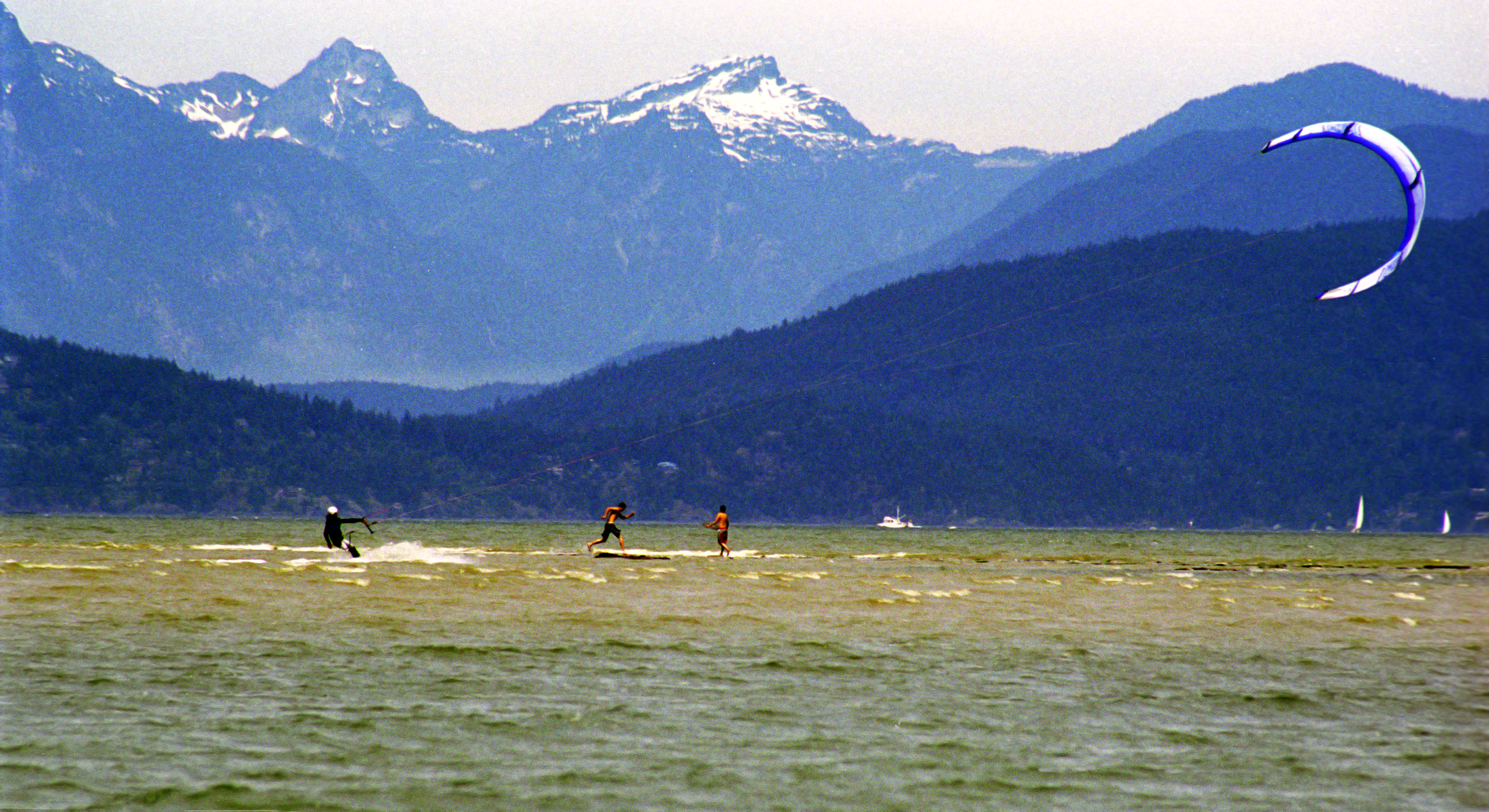
A kitesurfer passes two skimboarders during an early season low tide on the Spanish Banks. Mountains in the background are on the west side of Howe Sound.

Although technically just one bank, the Spanish Banks beaches are divided into three sections: Spanish Bank East, Spanish Bank Extension, and Spanish Bank West. These beaches are backed by grassy fields, which make them popular for walks, family gatherings, picnics, soccer and volleyball games. There is a separated bike path next to a walking path that runs parallel to the water. Metered parking was considered as other nearby beaches in Vancouver, such as Kitsilano Beach, are metered, but the decisions was postponed by the Vancouver Park Board in March 2018.

Spanish Banks is best known for its low tide flats, which are most prominent at Spanish Bank West. While swimming is possible at Spanish Bank East, skimboarding and kitesurfing are more popular activities at Spanish Bank West.

== The beaches ==
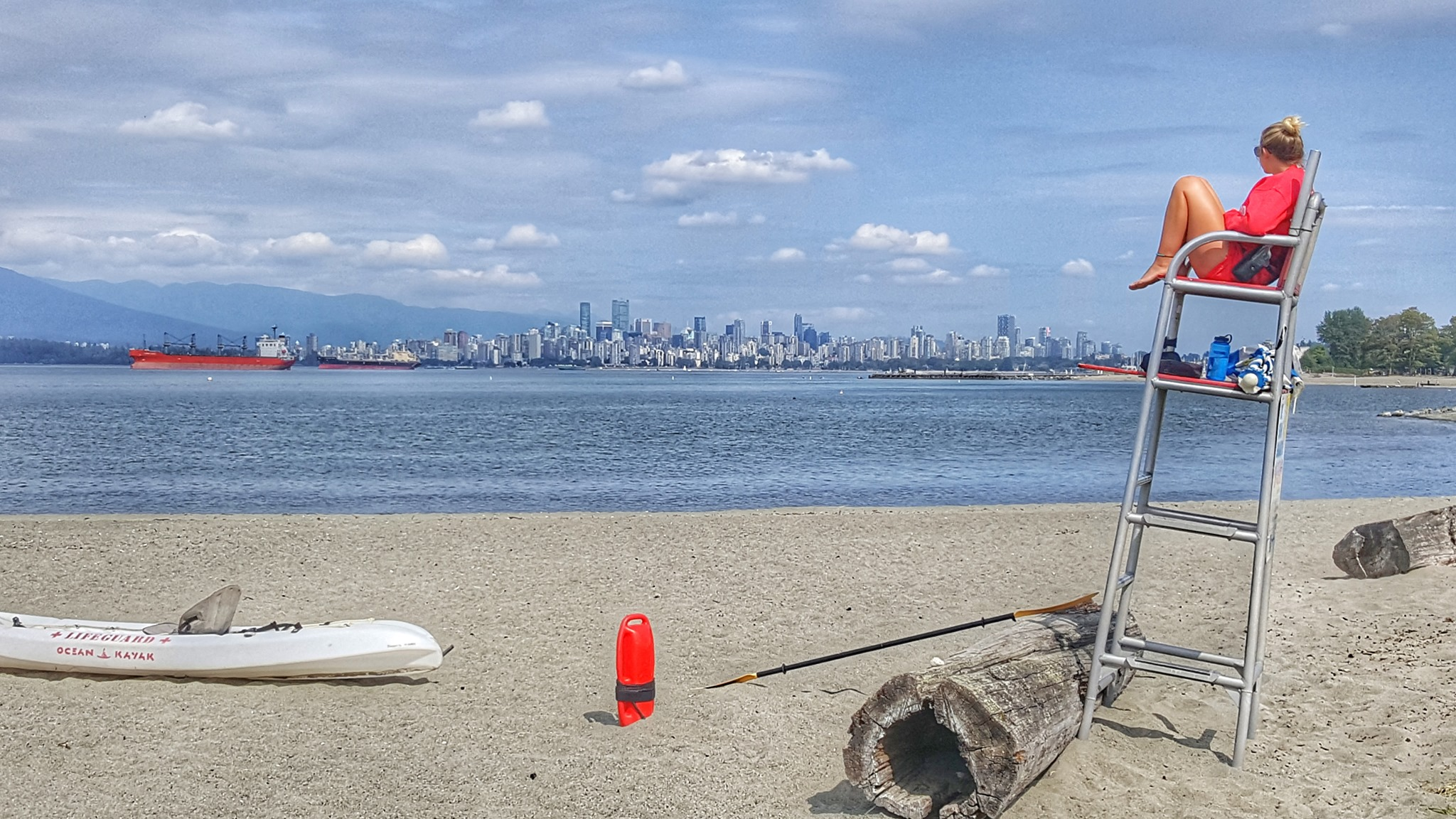
Lifeguard at work Spanish Banks Beach

=== Spanish Bank East ===
Spanish Bank East is situated west of Tolmie Street on Northwest Marine Drive. The beach is equipped with thirty sand volleyball courts that operate on a first-come, first-served basis. There are lifeguards on site (from Victoria Day to Labour Day), and a concession stand. A popular activity on Spanish Banks East is skimboarding in the many shallow pools and waves.

=== Spanish Bank West ===
Spanish Bank West is located west of Spanish Bank East on Northwest Marine Drive. Like Spanish Bank East, this beach has eight volleyball courts, life guards on site in summer and a concession stand. However, this beach is designated as a quiet beach so no amplified music is permitted.

=== Spanish Bank Extension ===
Spanish Bank Extension is to the west of Spanish Bank West and is the westernmost part of Spanish Banks before the shoreline becomes much narrower and rocky as it heads towards Acadia Beach. There are lifeguards on site in summer, but there are no concession stands or volleyball courts as there is little sand. Most of Spanish Banks Extension is a designated dogs off-leash area.
