= Point Grey =

Canadian promontory

Coordinates: 49°16′15″N 123°15′44″W

Boundaries of the Municipality of Point Grey, 1908–1929

Point Grey (Halkomelem: ʔəlqsən; Squamish: Ts’ats’lhm) is a headland marking the southern entrance to English Bay and Burrard Inlet in British Columbia, Canada. The headland is the site of Wreck Beach, Tower Beach, Point Grey Beach and most notably, since 1925, on its top is the Point Grey Campus of the University of British Columbia.

During World War II Tower Beach was the site of submarine watchtowers and gun emplacements while the UBC campus was CFB Point Grey. The watchtower ruins still stand and the gun emplacements have been incorporated into the Museum of Anthropology at UBC.

The name Point Grey is often used as a short form for the Vancouver neighbourhood of West Point Grey. It was named by Captain Vancouver for his friend Captain George Grey. The Spaniards, a year earlier, had named it Punta de Langara in honour of Admiral Don Juan de Langara.

Point Grey was also a shortened name for the Municipality of Point Grey, created in 1908 when it separated from the Municipality of South Vancouver. The municipality's eastern boundary south of 16th Avenue was Cambie Street, and Blanca Street was its eastern boundary north of 16th. Point Grey amalgamated with the City of Vancouver in 1929.

== See also ==
- List of World War II-era fortifications on the British Columbia Coast
