= Constance Hamilton =

British-Canadian government official and activist

Constance E. Hamilton

Toronto City Councillor for Ward 3
- In office 1920–1922

Personal details
- Born: 1862 Yorkshire, England
- Died: June 27, 1945 (aged 82) Toronto, Ontario, Canada
- Spouse: Lauchlan A. Hamilton
- Education: Conservatory of Music (Leipzig, Germany)
- Occupation: Politician, philanthropist, activist, patron
- Known for: Tied as first female councilperson in Ontario
- Website: Constance Hamilton Award

Constance Eaton Hamilton (1862 – June 27, 1945) was a British-Canadian government official and activist. After activism supporting refugees and women in Winnipeg, she moved to Toronto and continued to support causes such as women's suffrage, becoming president of the Equal Franchise League of Toronto. She was elected for a one-year term on the Toronto City Council in the 1920 elections, becoming the first female member of Toronto City Council and tied as the first woman in Ontario to hold elected office at either the federal, provincial, or municipal level. After two terms she resigned to continue her work campaigning for immigrant settlement and refugee issues, and for equal rights. In 1979, the Toronto city council established the Constance E. Hamilton Award on the Status of Women.

== Early life and education ==
She was born in Yorkshire, England in 1862 to Dr George Fowler Bodington (1829-1902) and Caroline Mary Eaton (1825-1873). Early she studied with private tutors. Fluent in German, she attended the Conservatory of Music in Leipzig, Germany and became a skilled pianist. She also worked as a part-time farmer for parts of her early life. Hamilton immigrated to Canada with her family in 1887 and settled in Vancouver. The following year she met and married Lauchlan Hamilton, an older businessman.

== Career ==
=== Civic activities in Winnipeg and Toronto ===
In 1888 she and her husband moved to Winnipeg, when her husband was transferred there as senior Canadian Pacific Railway land commissioner. During her time in Winnipeg, she was one of the six women who founded the Women's Musical Club of Winnipeg, and served as the first president when it was formally organized in 1899. She also used her German to assist new immigrants to the city.

She and her husband moved to Toronto, Ontario in 1899, when the city's population was 200,000. A supporter of women's suffrage, she became president of the Equal Franchise League of Toronto and also the National Suffrage Organization. With a passion described as focusing on the broad themes of "Bach, agriculture and politics," she chaired the Toronto branch of the National Refugee Committee and would lead the National Council of Women's agriculture committee. She founded Toronto's Bach Society. She was a volunteer for Big Sisters and YWCA, and a writer, arts patron, linguist, and social advocate.

=== Elected office in Toronto in 1920 ===
In 1919, women obtained the right to run for elected office in Ontario. Previously married women had been barred, by law, from doing so. The elective office of public school trustee was open to Ontario widows and unmarried women who owned property from about 1884, although the first female trustees to be elected in Toronto were in 1892. Hamilton ran for Toronto city council for a one-year term in 1920, in the first year that women over 21 could vote. Hamilton fought the race over eight other male opponents, for one of three spots in Ward 3, "a long, narrow downtown ward, stretching from the waterfront north almost to St. Clair Ave., and taking in King, Front, Church, Yonge and Bay streets." Her platform was a mix of social and practical concerns, including a stronger police force and more library funding. Winning the race, she became one of the first two women in Ontario to hold elected office at either the federal, provincial, or municipal level. While newspapers reported her the first, Margaret Foley had been elected by acclaimation to Orangeville council three days prior. Her swearing in ceremony received little press. In office, she championed issues such as a raise in minimum wage, health initiatives, for more women judges, and urged reforms for hiring of domestic workers, also championing a maximum 10-hour workday.

=== Second term and retirement ===
She was re-elected for another one-year term in 1921. After two terms in office she resigned for reasons that "remain a mystery." According to the city of Toronto, she resigned so that she could continue to campaign for immigrant settlement and refugee issues, and for equal rights. After politics, much of her time went into finding employment for new refugees in Toronto, and she also served on the board of Woman's Century, a magazine.

== Personal life and legacy ==
Hamilton married Canadian Pacific Railway land commissioner and civil engineer Lauchlan Alexander Hamilton (1852-1941), who was also Vancouver City Alderman and designed the Coat of arms of Vancouver. They did not have any children, but Lauchlan had a daughter (Isabella) from his marriage to Isabella Hamilton (1858?-1888). Her husband died in 1941 and she died in Toronto on June 27, 1945.

She and her husband lived in Toronto at 30 Saint Joseph Street, in a "sparsely furnished old house just north of Wellesley Street" with a "scruffy, homey and lived-in look." The Bach Society met in the drawing room, and friend later said that Hamilton "filled the rackety old house with a succession of lame dogs and tame cats; refugee cellists from Austria; Englishmen with a gift of the gab who were down on their luck; unemployed Italian waiters; poverty stricken painters; young clergymen whose faith had been shaken." It also became a "magnet" for those in the literary, cultural, and radio broadcasting worlds of Toronto. She also maintained a summer home at Lorne Park west of Toronto for "indigent artists and musicians" with a dozen "ramshackle" cottages on a large property with pine trees. She would cook for the collection of artists herself, never charging money for the meals.

In 1979, city council established the Constance E. Hamilton Award on the Status of Women, to be awarded to a resident of Toronto whose actions have "had a significant impact on securing equitable treatment for women in Toronto, either socially, economically or culturally." The women members of Toronto City Council select the recipient, or multiple recipients.

== Election results ==
- 1920 Toronto municipal election - Ward 3 (Central Business District and The Ward)

F.W. Johnston (incumbent) - 1,835
Alfred Burgess - 1,825
Constance Hamilton - 1,626
Charles W. Mugridge (incumbent) - 1,388
George Rose - 1,369
John W. Beatty - 1,284
William Harper - 945
Harry Winberg - 943
William Stevenson - 383

- 1921 Toronto municipal election - Ward 3 (Central Business District and The Ward)

Alfred Burgess (incumbent) - 2,685
George Rose - 1,867
Constance Hamilton (incumbent) - 1,815
F.W. Johnston (incumbent) - 1,614
C.A. Reed - 1,608
Aubrey Bond - 1,604
Andrew Carrick - 1,182
Robert Morse - 211

== See also ==
- List of electoral firsts in Canada
- Agnes Macphail
