= Kitsilano Beach =

Beach in Vancouver, British Columbia, Canada

Kitsilano Beach X̱epx̱páy̓em (Squamish)
- Beach
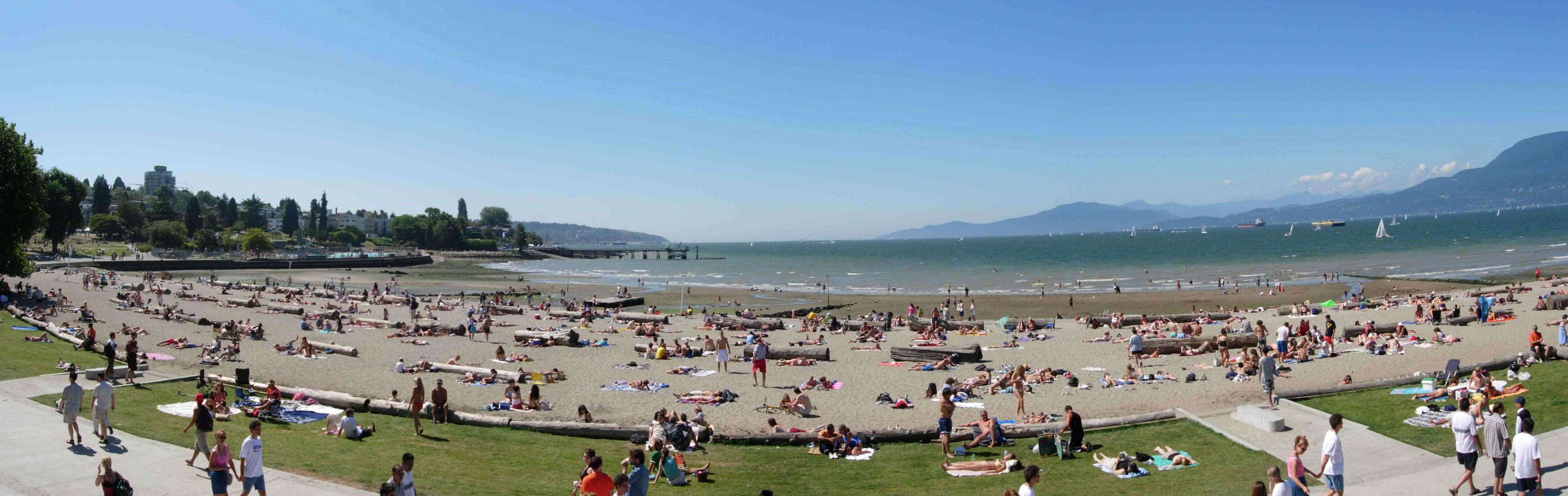
- Fish-eye view of Kitsilano Beach

- Location within British Columbia
- Coordinates: 49°16′26″N 123°9′18.4″W
- Topo map: NTS 92G6 North Vancouver

Kitsilano Beach (Squamish: X̱epx̱páy̓em) is a beach on English Bay in the Kitsilano neighborhood of Vancouver, British Columbia, Canada. It is one of the most popular beaches in the city.

== Description ==
In the Squamish language, is called Xwupxpayʼem, which translates to "having red cedar".

The beach is home to the longest swimming pool in Canada, the salt-water outdoor Kitsilano Pool, operated by the Vancouver Park Board and open annually from May to September. Toward the northern edge of the beach is a playground and a number of beach volleyball courts.

== History ==
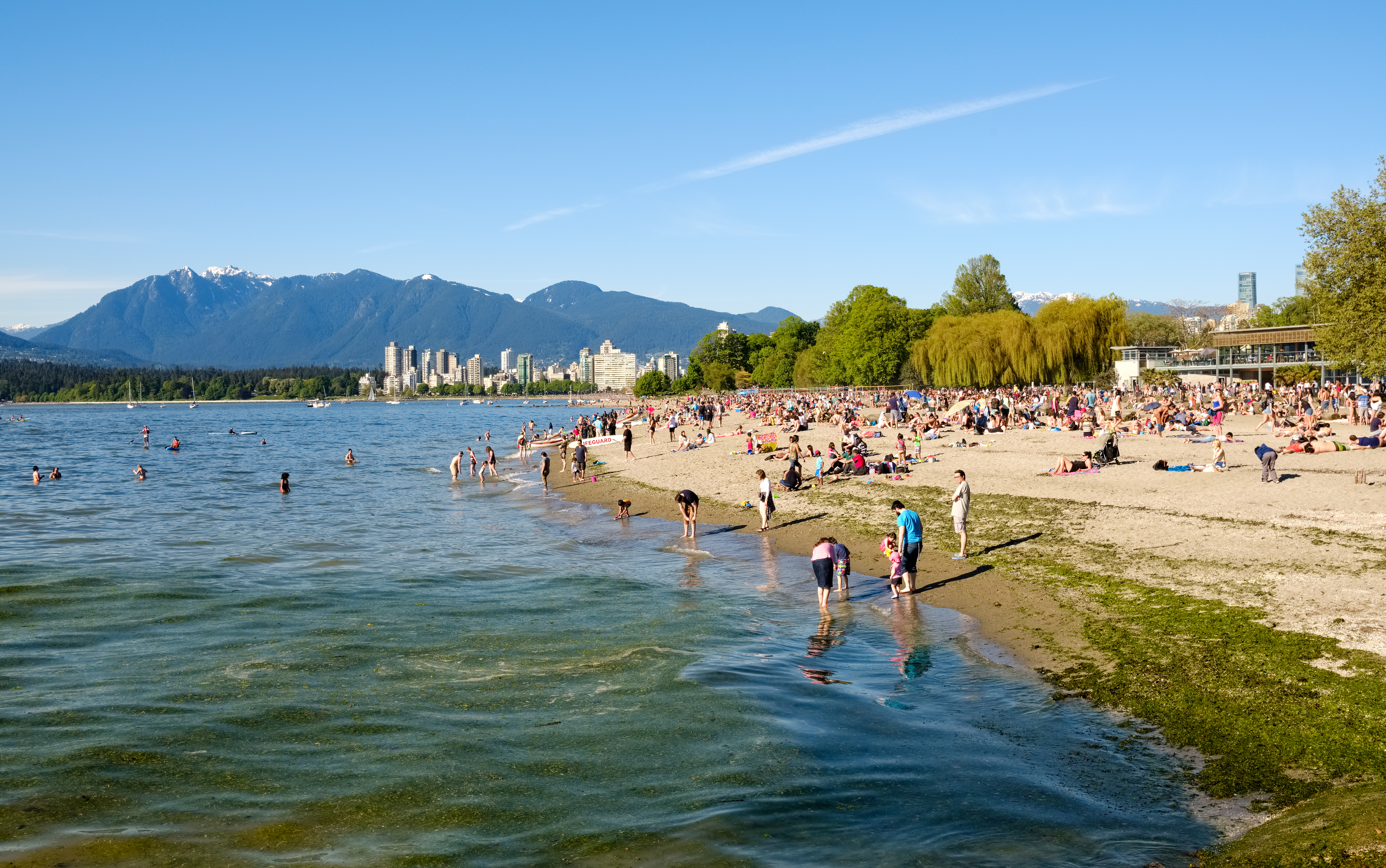
Kitsilano Beach with the West End, Stanley Park and the North Shore Mountains in the distance

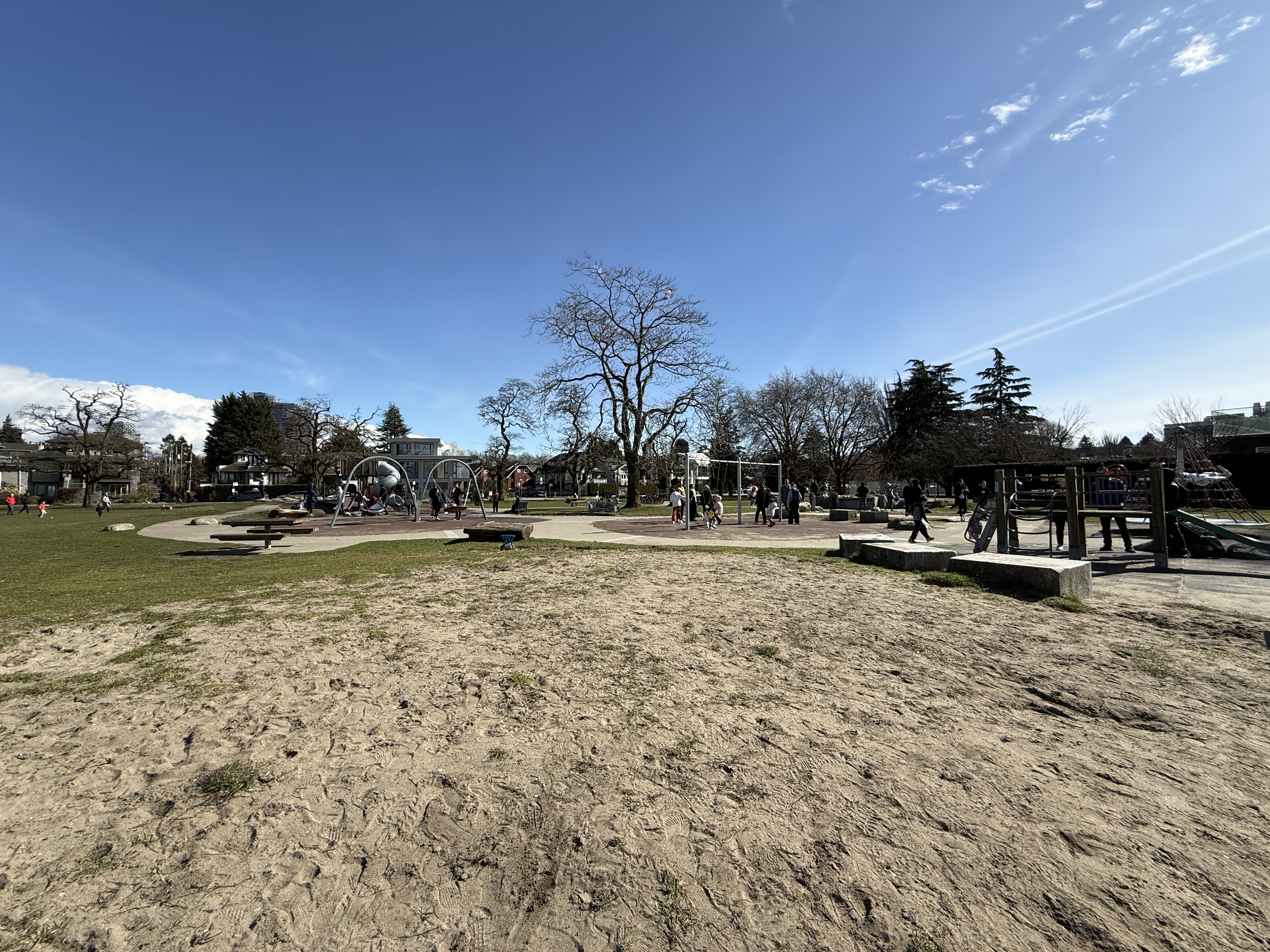
Kitsilano Beach Playground

In 1901, the beach was being transformed for future inclusion in a city park system: "The whole approach to the beach will be cleared, graded and seeded, and the beach itself cleared of what rocks and driftwood there is to annoy bathers, and the magnificent property will be made available for the people."

Vancouver residents first knew the area as "Greer's Beach" after settler Sam Greer, who pre-empted 160 acres on the waterfront in 1882 for farming. When the provincial government granted Greer's land to the Canadian Pacific Railway, he was forced out and his home destroyed. The railway considered developing the area into a rail-serviced port facility, but ultimately sold it.

In 1905, the name "Kitsilano" began appearing in real estate advertisements, such as one for "Lots at Kitsilano - Greer's Beach" for sale by the British Columbia Electric Railway. In 1906, campsites were advertised at "'Kitsilano' Greer's Beach". The British Columbia Electric Railway made a deal with the Canadian Pacific to run a tram from downtown Vancouver "to a point called Greer's Beach, or Kitsilano".

In 1906, the company managing the facilities at the beach for the Canadian Pacific announced plans for a baseball field, a dance pavilion over the water, and a dock for a small ferry to run to the new "country club" at Jericho Beach.

Commencing in 1909 and continuing over several years, the City of Vancouver acquired several portions of what is now the public beach park. In 2005, the bath house structure was demolished and replaced with a modern structure featuring the Watermark restaurant on top, boasting an expansive view of the beach and English Bay. The Watermark building was later sold to The Boathouse restaurant franchise.
