= Locarno Beach =

Beach in British Columbia, Canada

Coordinates: 49.2757°N 123.2045°W

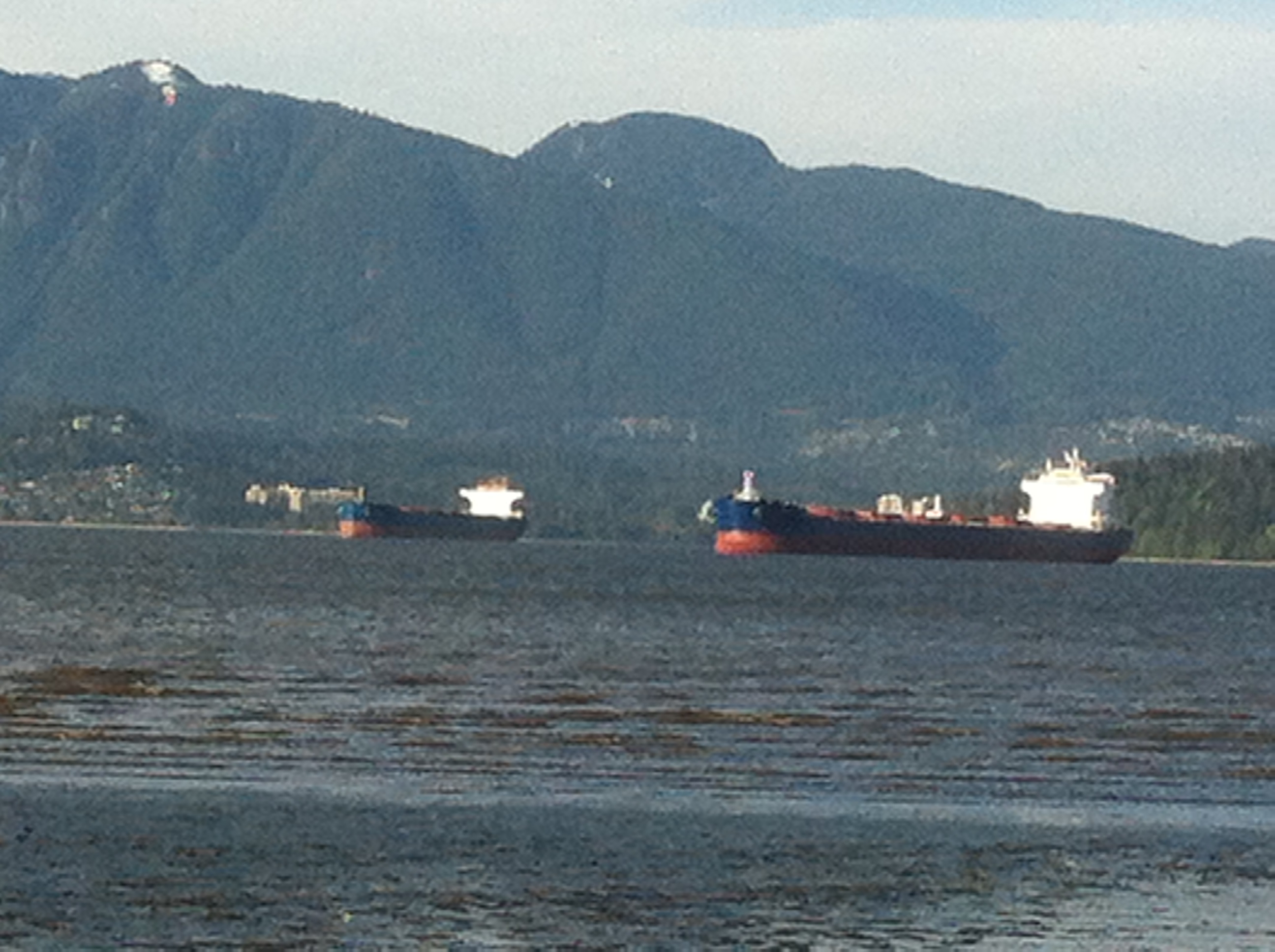
English Bay off Locarno Beach, Vancouver, Canada

Locarno Beach (Squamish: Ḵweḵw7úpay̓, "lots of crab apple trees") is one of the beaches that line English Bay in Vancouver. It is situated in the West Point Grey neighbourhood, between Jericho Beach and the Spanish Banks beaches. It was named after the Swiss city where a peace treaty was signed in 1925.

Although Locarno Beach is designated as one of Vancouver's "quiet beaches", the park area nearby is popular with families having picnics and barbecues in the summertime. It is also located near Vancouver's largest Youth Hostel.
