= Flag of Vancouver =

Canadian municipal flag

- Use: Civil and state flag
- Proportion: 1∶2
- Adopted: May 17, 1983; 43 years ago
- Designed by: Robert Watt

The flag of Vancouver is a white field with five wavy blue bars and a green pentagon on the hoist side surmounted by a gold shield with the city badge, which consists of a mural crown with a crossed axe and paddle. It was adopted by Vancouver City Council on May 17, 1983, and designed by Robert Watt, the director of the Museum of Vancouver at the time, and later the Chief Herald of Canada.

== Symbolism ==
The white and blue symbolize Vancouver's position as a natural harbour on the Pacific Ocean, while the green pentagon represents the land on which the city was built, and the forests that stood on the land. These features echo the motto on the pre-1969 municipal coat of arms "By Sea and Land We Prosper". The mural crown in the city badge reflects Vancouver's status as an incorporated city, while the axe and paddle stand for the city's traditional industries, logging and fishing.

== Protocol ==
The flag of Vancouver is flown alongside the flag of British Columbia on 24-metre (80 ft) poles on the northern lawn of Vancouver City Hall. The city council must pass a motion to change these flags, except during Vancouver Pride Week, when the rainbow and transgender pride flags are flown in their place. While the Vancouver and British Columbia flags are flown with equal priority, the Canadian flag always occupies the tallest flagpole (if they are uneven) and the position of honour (i.e. centred for odd numbers of flags and to the farthest left of the viewer for even).

== Former flag ==
Prior to the 1983 flag, Vancouver had a different municipal flag that was the winner of a contest held in 1978. The winning submission was designed by Rudolph Danglemaier, who received CA$300 in prize money. The flag featured a white Canadian pale flanked by a green stripe on the hoist side, and a blue stripe on the fly side. The shield, helmet, mantling and crest from the city arms were placed in the centre of the flag. The flag was approved by the city council, but never adopted nor manufactured due to a lack of public interest.
