= Our Lady of Perpetual Help School =

Our Lady of Perpetual Help Catholic School

Location
- 2550 Camosun Street; Vancouver, British Columbia, V6R 3W6; Canada
- Coordinates: 49.2641°N 123.1964°W

Information
- School type: Private Elementary school
- Motto: Ad Jesum per Mariam
- Founded: 1927
- School board: CISVA (Catholic Independent Schools of the Vancouver Archdiocese)
- Principal: Deirdre O'Callaghan
- Grades: Junior Kindergarten-Grade 7
- Enrollment: Approximately 550 (2024-2025 School Year)
- Language: EnglishFrench
- Area: West Point Grey
- Colours: Blue, White, Navy
- Team name: Eagles
- Website: www.olphbc.ca

Our Lady of Perpetual Help School in Vancouver, British Columbia, is a Catholic elementary school. The school opened in 1927, was run by the Sisters of Charity of Halifax.

The school, along with the O.L.P.H. parish, on Camosun Street, on 2250 Camosun Street. There are two classes in each grade, with the exception of preschool, with three classes. The school offers education from Junior Kindergarten to Grade seven.

== School Sports ==
The school provides sports to students, for example,Cross Country,Track and Field,Basketball,Soccer,Badminton,pickleball,high and long jump.

== 2005 school fire ==
On March 5, 2005, at about 4:00 am local time, a 3-alarm fire began in the 5B classroom, destroying the oldest section of the school in fire and water damage. Vancouver College took in the whole school community until the beginning of May 2005, where the burned sections were closed off, and portables were set up in place of the damaged classrooms.

Finally, the school was entirely repaired before the end of the 2005–06 school year, and the portables were removed and there has been no fire since as of mid 2026
