= Where Are Your Keys? =

Interactive technique for learning languages

Where Are Your Keys? (WAYK) is an interactive technique for learning languages directly from native speakers. It is a game-based approach that uses gesture and sign language to facilitate immediate communication in the target language. The game is based on repeated questions and answers, with a set of gestures. Initially, the student makes gestures for specific, concrete objects, such as keys or a rock, and then moves on to adjectives. The student always responds in full sentences. The language gestures used are based on American Sign Language. Because the focus is creating an interactive game between the native speaker and the learner, it may be preferable to select a native speaker without language-teaching experience. The game trains speakers in language fluency.

The technique has been used in instruction of Alutiiq, Chinuk Wawa, Konkow, Kutenai, Mohawk, Navajo, O'odham, Squamish, Unangax, French, Latin, Irish, Korean, Turkish, and at a Chickasaw language immersion camp for families. Users report that the Where Are Your Keys? technique can be used with any language for which a willing fluent speaker is available.

According to creator Evan Gardner, Where Are Your Keys? is partially based on the Total Physical Response technique.

Where Are Your Keys? language acquisition workshops have been held at the American Indian Language Development Institute of the University of Arizona, at Stanford University, at Northwest Indian College, at the 2010 "Save Your Language" Conference in Vancouver, British Columbia, at the Northeast Conference on the Teaching of Foreign Languages, and at the 2012 Maryland Foreign Language Association Fall Conference, held at Notre Dame of Maryland University.

As of 2012, a Where Are Your Keys? podcast and wiki are available, as well as online videos and an official website.

== See also ==
- Total physical response (TPR)
- Fluency
- Hand game
