= James Blomfield =

Canadian stained glass artist and designer

- Born: James Jervis Bloomfield; 1879; Maidenhead, Berkshire, England
- Died: 1951 (aged 71–72); Toronto, Ontario
- Education: studied painting and engraving in Calgary, Alberta (1887, 1889); art education in England and Belgium (1894); Art Students League, New York
- Spouse: Mary Augusta Diamond

James Jervis Blomfield (1879-1951) was an English-born Canadian artist and designer. He is best known for his design of the coat of arms of Vancouver and as a pioneer in the field of stained glass art in Canada, with an extensive body of works completed in British Columbia and Ontario, including the Beechwood Cemetery Mausoleum in Ottawa, Canada's national cemetery. He lived in Toronto for the last 30 years of his life and painted many watercolours of the city. In 1927, he said, "I hope to be known as the discoverer of Toronto."

== Background ==
He was born James Alfred Bloomfield in Maidenhead, Berkshire, England. The middle name he added from his mother's maiden name later in life when he also dropped the second 'o' in Bloomfield. He was born deaf and worked for a period of time as a junior draftsman. before moving with his family to Canada, to Calgary, Alberta in 1887. In Calgary, he studied painting and engraving (1887, 1889). His father Henry Bloomfield was an artist and engraver and the family lived in Calgary, then moved to New Westminster, British Columbia. There in 1890, Henry established the first art glass studio in British Columbia which he ran with his sons James and Charles, later moving the operation to Vancouver in 1899. In Vancouver, Blomfield attracted the attention of Lord Aberdeen who paid for his art education in England and Belgium.

== Foundations & work ==
On his return to Canada, his career flourished with such commissions as Holy Trinity Cathedral, New Westminster, St. Paul's Anglican Church in Vancouver, Gabriola, the home of Benjamin Tingley, and the original Rogers Window at Government House in Victoria (destroyed by fire in 1957).

Together with Robert McKay Fripp, S.M. Everleigh, and A. Woodroffe, in 1900 he co-founded the Arts and Crafts Association of Vancouver, which later became the Studio Club (1904) and finally the British Columbia Society of Fine Arts (1908).

Some time after the turn of the century, he moved to Washington State and later to Chicago where he became professor of design at the Chicago Academy of Fine Art. In 1918 he worked for the Christian Science Monitor as a staff writer.

== Final years ==
By 1922, he had removed to Toronto where he would spend his final years. He died after being struck by a motorist in downtown Toronto at the age of 72. He was married in 1903 to Mary Augusta Diamond of Belleville, Ontario, who predeceased him in 1930. They had no children. Their remains are interred at the Hamilton (now Bayview) Mausoleum in Hamilton, Ontario; the stained glass windows of the mausoleum were designed by Blomfield in the 1920s.

== Recognition ==
In 1982, a plaque commemorating Blomfield was unveiled at the Hamilton Mausoleum. There is a plaque on his former home at W 10th Ave & Columbia St, in Vancouver. Blomfield's name is included on the official list of potential Vancouver street names. He was a member of the Ontario Society of Artists.
