= Wreck Beach =

Clothing-optional beach in British Columbia, Canada

Coordinates: 49.2611°N 123.2614°W

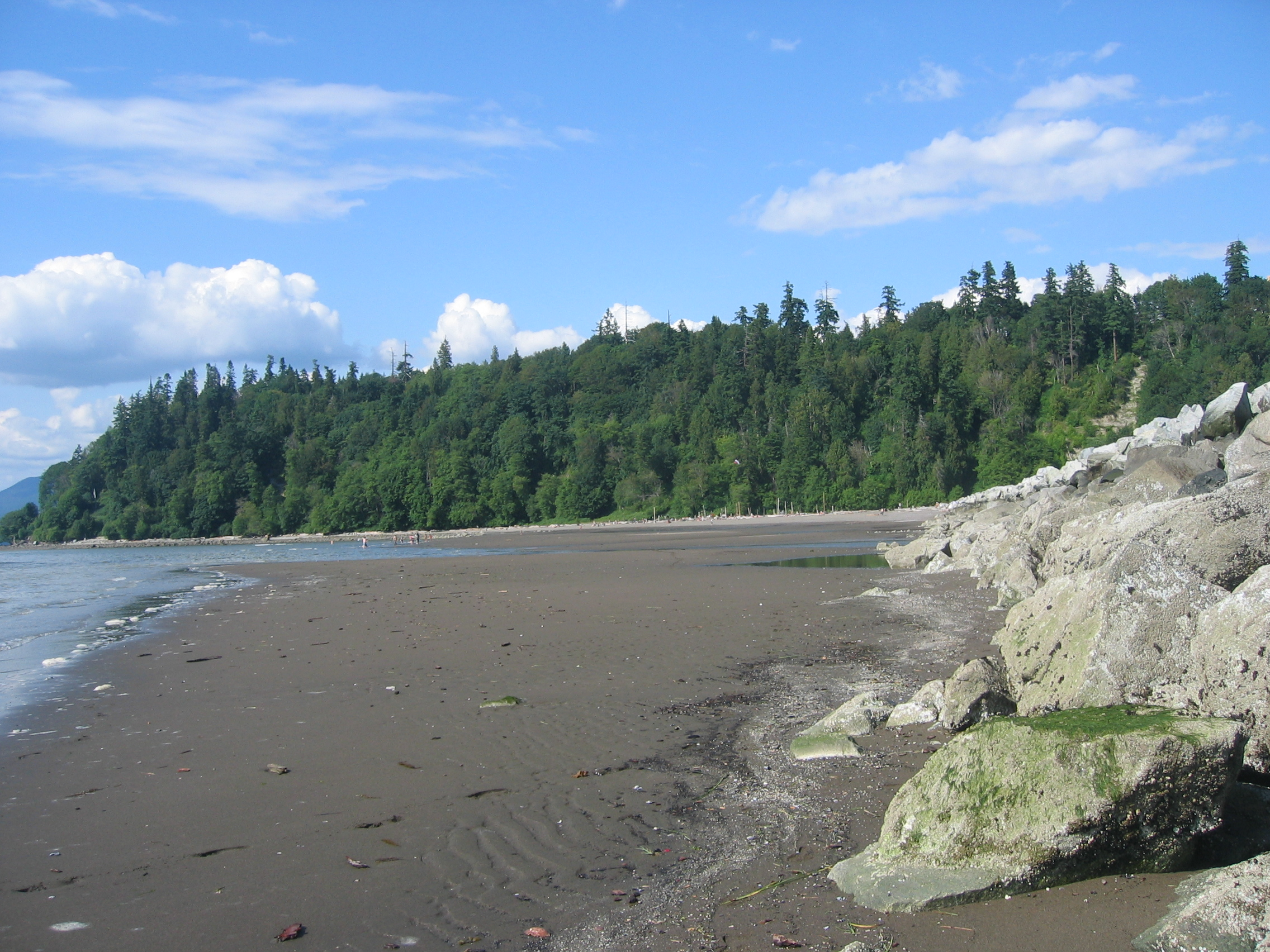
View of Point Grey from Wreck Beach proper

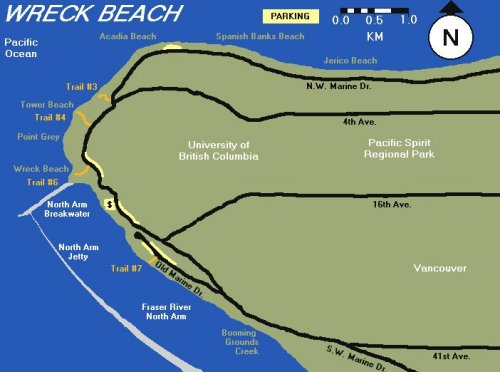
Map of Wreck Beach

Wreck Beach (Squamish: Tsʼatʼlhm) is a clothing-optional beach located in Pacific Spirit Regional Park, a part of Electoral Area A just west of Vancouver, British Columbia, Canada. The clothing-optional section is clearly marked with signs and stretches about 6.7 kilometres or 4.2 miles from Acadia Beach, in the north, to the Booming Grounds Creek on the north arm of the Fraser River. The park is administered by Metro Vancouver, though Indigenous claims are repeatedly asserted, particularly by the Musqueam Nation.

== History ==
World War II–era "instrument tower"

The earliest evidence of Indigenous peoples inhabitation dates back to 13,000 B.C. being the hunting, fishing, logging, spiritual connection grounds for the Musqueam, referred to as "Ulksen" or "the nose". The beach is reclaimed from the sea in a joint venture with the Canadian Army and UBC to train cadets for beach landings in World War I, hence the presence of the "instrument towers".

During the Great Depression, nude bathing became popular due to high costs of swimsuits with men congregating on Siwash Rock in Stanley Park, to escape the puritanicalist oppression of local residents, a legacy of the Victorian era, they then flocked to Wreck Beach. The beach increased in popularity with hippies until the late 1960s when a police raid in 1970 yielded a dozen arrests. The Georgia Straight staged a nude-in protest with 3,000 showing up and the charges were dropped, with the police designating the area as a "no-harm, no-foul zone" until 1991 when it was officially designated a legally recognised nudist beach.

On January 25, 1977, the Citizens Concerned for Coward's Cove was formally established, then changed to Wreck Beach Committee, then to the Wreck Beach Preservation Society in 1983. The WBPS has fought against these developments: a 20-million cubic meter dredging operation behind the North Arm breakwater; a parallel trail from Trail 6 to Trail 7 (One already built there quietly by two unknowns); a proposal to barge millions of gallons of "jet-fuel A" past Wreck Beach weekly; toe-to-cliff-top condominiums (proposed in 2004); a 20-foot high, 10-foot wide sea wall over the beach it would supposedly have been meant to protect; viewing platforms which would have changed the interpretation of the Canadian Criminal Code insofar as nudity was concerned; the cutting of 40-acres of cliff face forest and then, the shaving of the cliffs in those 40-acres, and the construction of an RCMP service road to and along the beach. Current threats to the beach area include a restaurant overlooking the beach, the elimination of all curb-side parking, the grassing in of Marine Drive, and possible washrooms on the beach level instead of above and out of sight of the beach. In 2012, permanent toilet outhouses were installed.

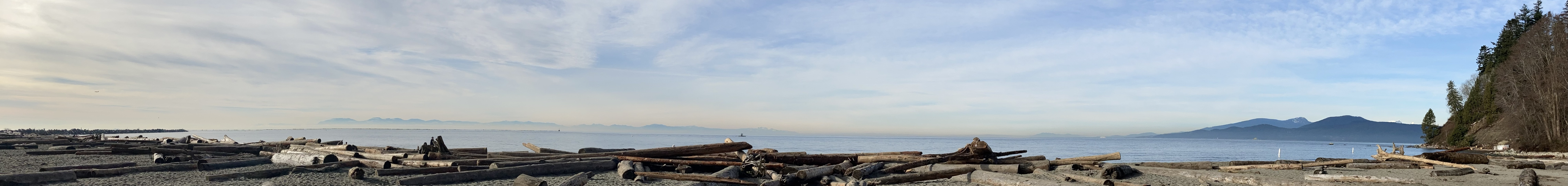
Panorama of Wreck Beach

== See also ==
- Clothes free organizations
- List of public outdoor clothes free places
