= English Bay, Vancouver =

Bay in Vancouver, Canada

English Bay
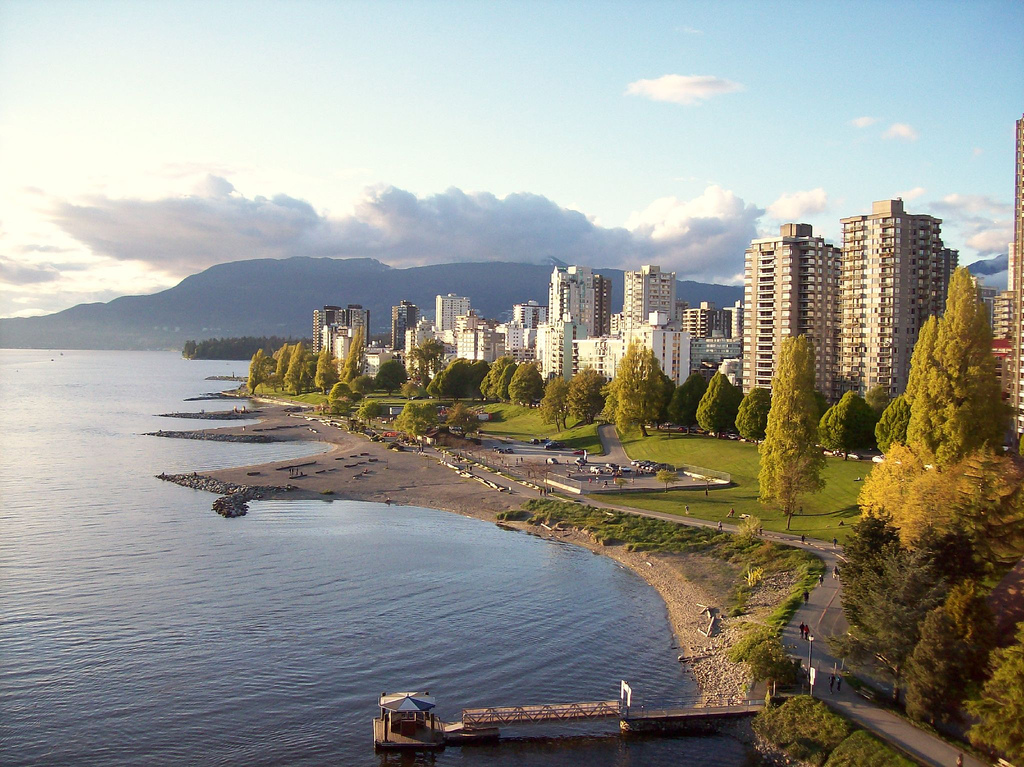
- High-rise apartment buildings along English Bay

- Location of English Bay in the Lower Mainland
- Coordinates: 49°17′00″N 123°09′15″W
- Type: Bay
- Part of: Burrard Inlet
- Frozen: Never
- Settlements: Vancouver

English Bay is an open bay northwest of the Burrard Peninsula in British Columbia, Canada, extending from the headland between Siwash Rock and Prospect Point on Vancouver's Downtown peninsula in the northeast, to the northwestern tip of Point Grey in the southwest. The bay encompasses the coasts of Stanley Park, the West End, Kitsilano, West Point Grey and the University Endowment Lands, and makes up the southeastern portion of the outer Burrard Inlet. There is a narrow inlet named False Creek at its eastern end.

== Attractions ==
English Bay Beach, near the city's West End residential neighbourhood, is a popular sunbathing, swimming, and sunset-watching beach in the downtown Vancouver area. Other downtown beaches facing English Bay include Sunset Beach, Second Beach, and Third Beach. Along the south shore of the bay lie Kitsilano Beach, Jericho Beach, Locarno Beach, and the Spanish Banks beaches, while on the North Shore are Ambleside Beach and various smaller cove-beaches in the city of West Vancouver. The beaches facing English Bay are a major tourist attraction all year long, with the peak season being late summer.

The Vancouver Seawall runs all the way around English Bay from Stanley Park in the northeast around False Creek at Point Grey facing the Strait of Georgia in the southwest. This is a favourite destination for walkers, runners, bicyclists, and roller-bladers. (Note: the Seawall is one-way for cyclists and roller-bladers, running counter-clockwise from just east of the Lions Gate Bridge to Third Beach.)

English Bay Beach is host to a number of public events. The Celebration of Light is a fireworks competition that is held for two weeks every summer (usually the last week in July and first week in August). While this competition often struggles to secure funding, it has successfully run since 1990 and is the largest off-shore fireworks display in the world. Each winter it is the host of Vancouvers' annual Polar Bear Swim and each summer the Vancouver Pride Parade and Festival is held on English Bay Beach.

== History ==
In the late 19th and early 20th centuries, English Bay Beach was home to Vancouver's first official lifeguard, the legendary Joe Fortes, who taught hundreds of the city's early residents how to swim, and patrolled the beach from his cabin on its shore. Today, the waters of the bay are often dotted with hundreds of small pleasure boats, as well as huge freighters waiting at anchor to load cargoes at Vancouver's port.

The beach was the site of an oil spill on April 8, 2015. The official cause of the spill has not been confirmed, but at least 2,700 litres (590 imp gal; 710 US gal) of "bunker fuel" are known to have escaped from a cargo ship into the bay. The highly toxic oil later washed up on nearby beaches, creating a slick 15–20 centimetres (5.9–7.9 in) thick. At least twenty seabirds were injured or affected by the spill, but the full extent of any environmental and economic damage is unknown at this early stage. The federal government was criticized for its response to the spill, including the delay in notifying the public of the health hazard, by the mayor and premier, environmental scientists, and an international shipping expert. Coast Guard officials defended the response, with regional director Assistant Commissioner Roger Girouard saying, "it was exceptional".

The beaches were tested and most were reopened following a ten-day closure. While the water and soil at most of the beaches tested was found not to have harmful levels of oil present, the government cautioned that "small amounts" of oil may remain, and urged people to be aware of the possible hazard and avoid contact with any oil. The reopened beaches will continue to be tested and the need for further cleanup assessed as needed.

== Gallery ==
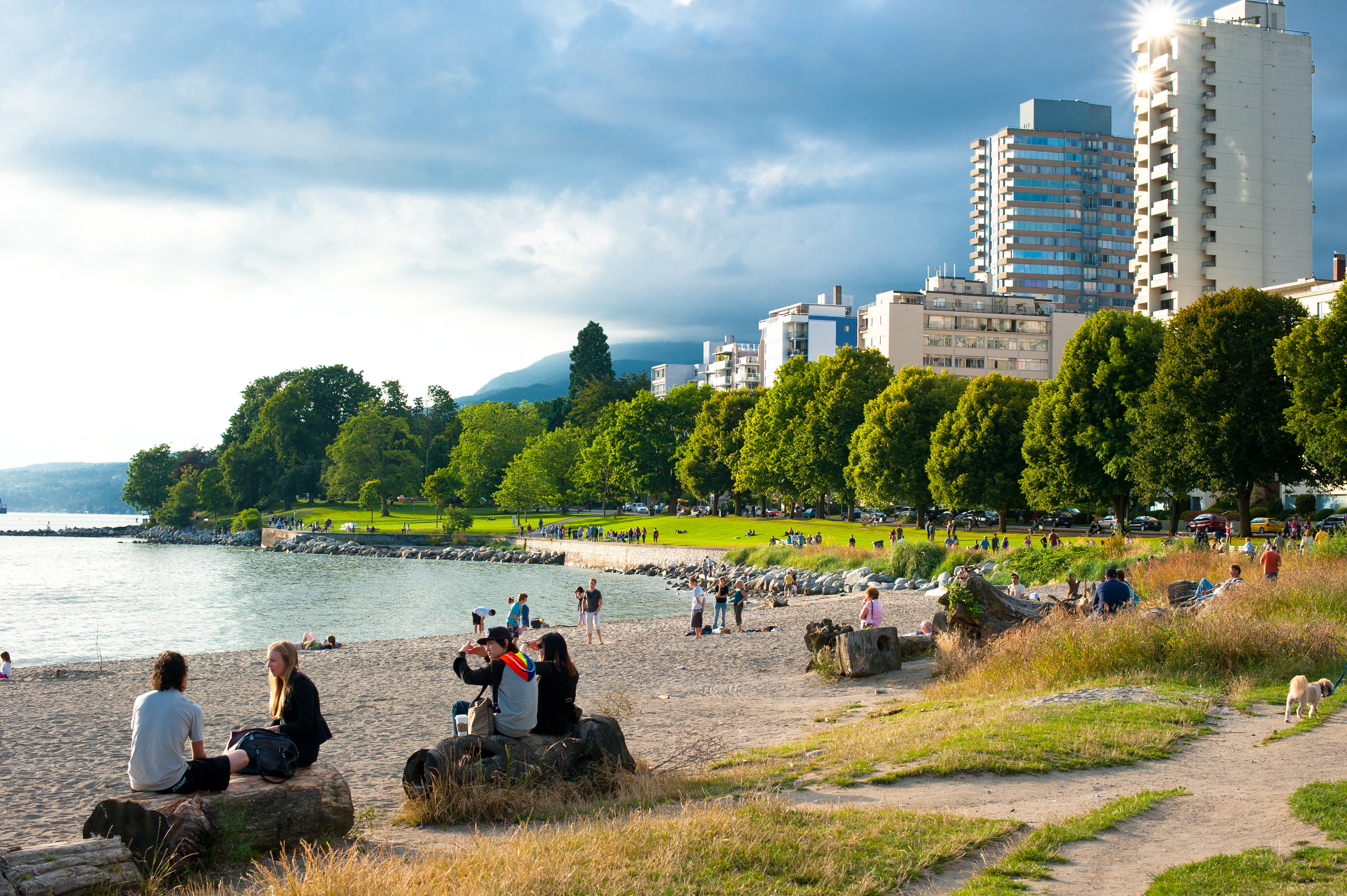
A cloudy day along English Bay

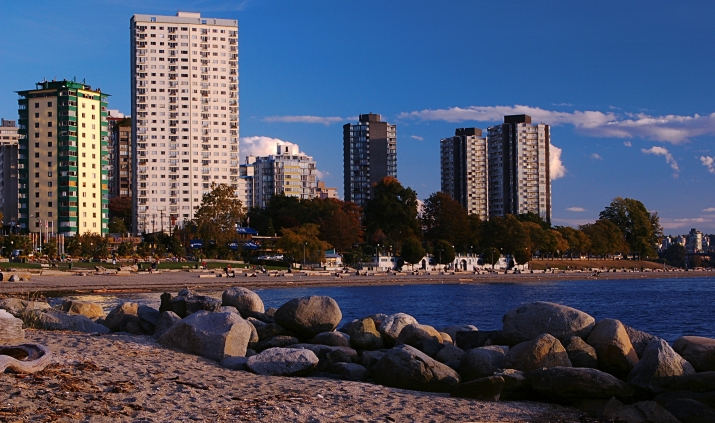
Looking along English Bay Beach in the West End

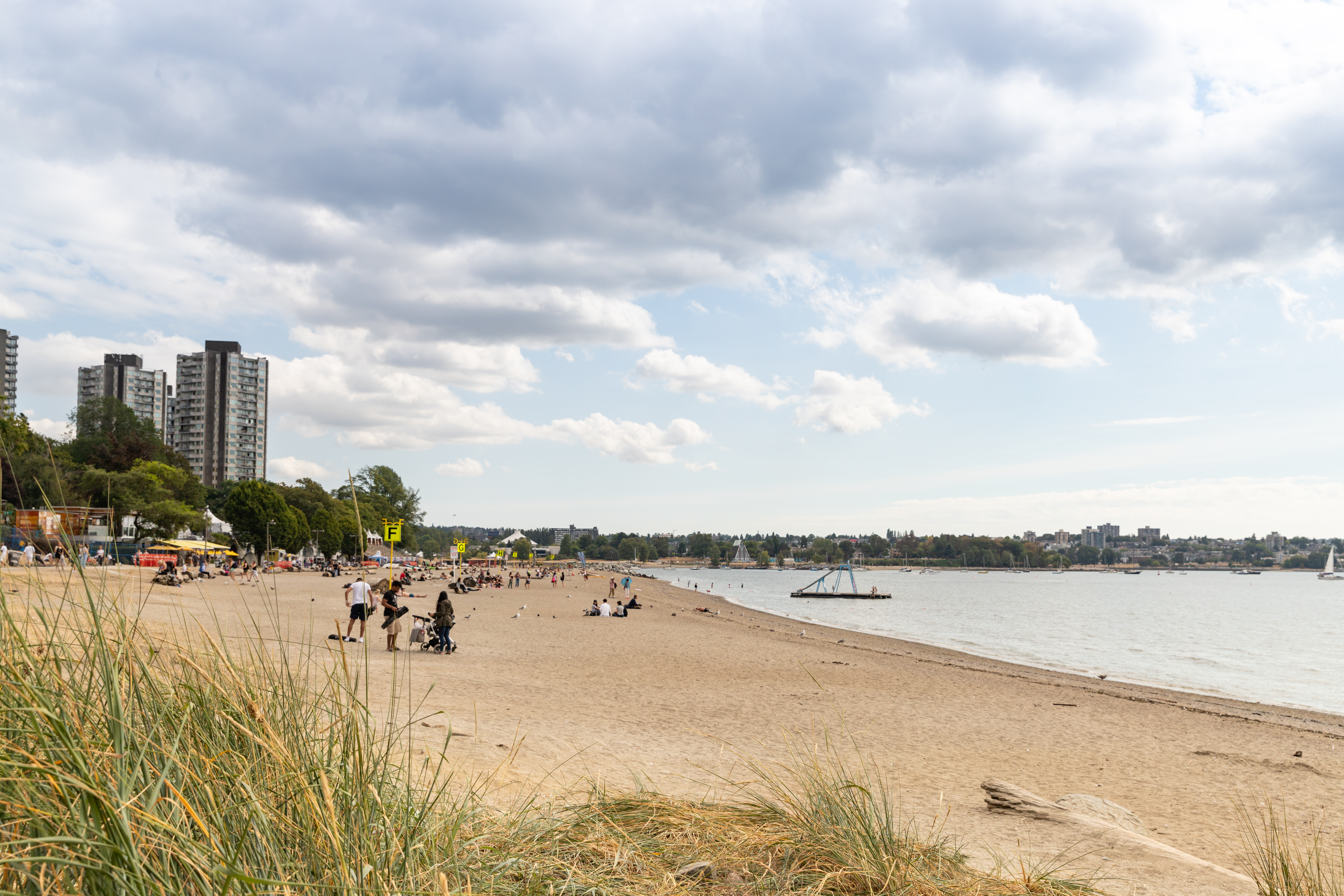
English Bay Beach, Vancouver

English Bay at sunset

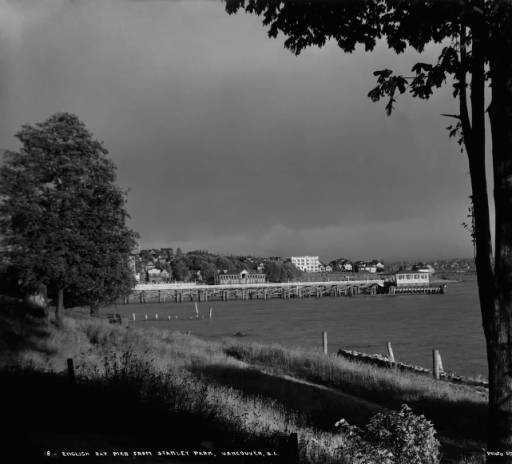
English Bay Pier from Stanley Park

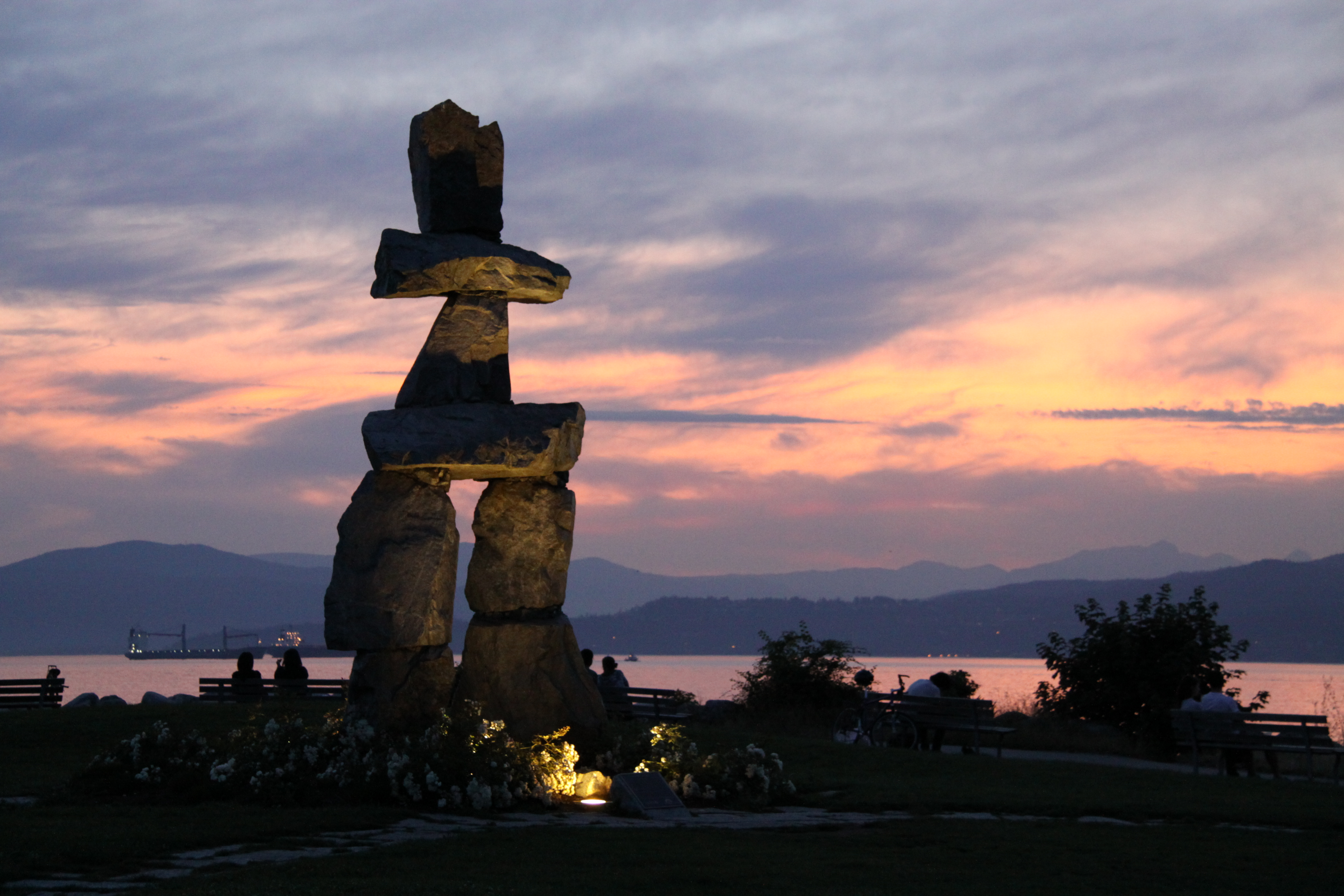
Sunset on the inuksuk at English Bay

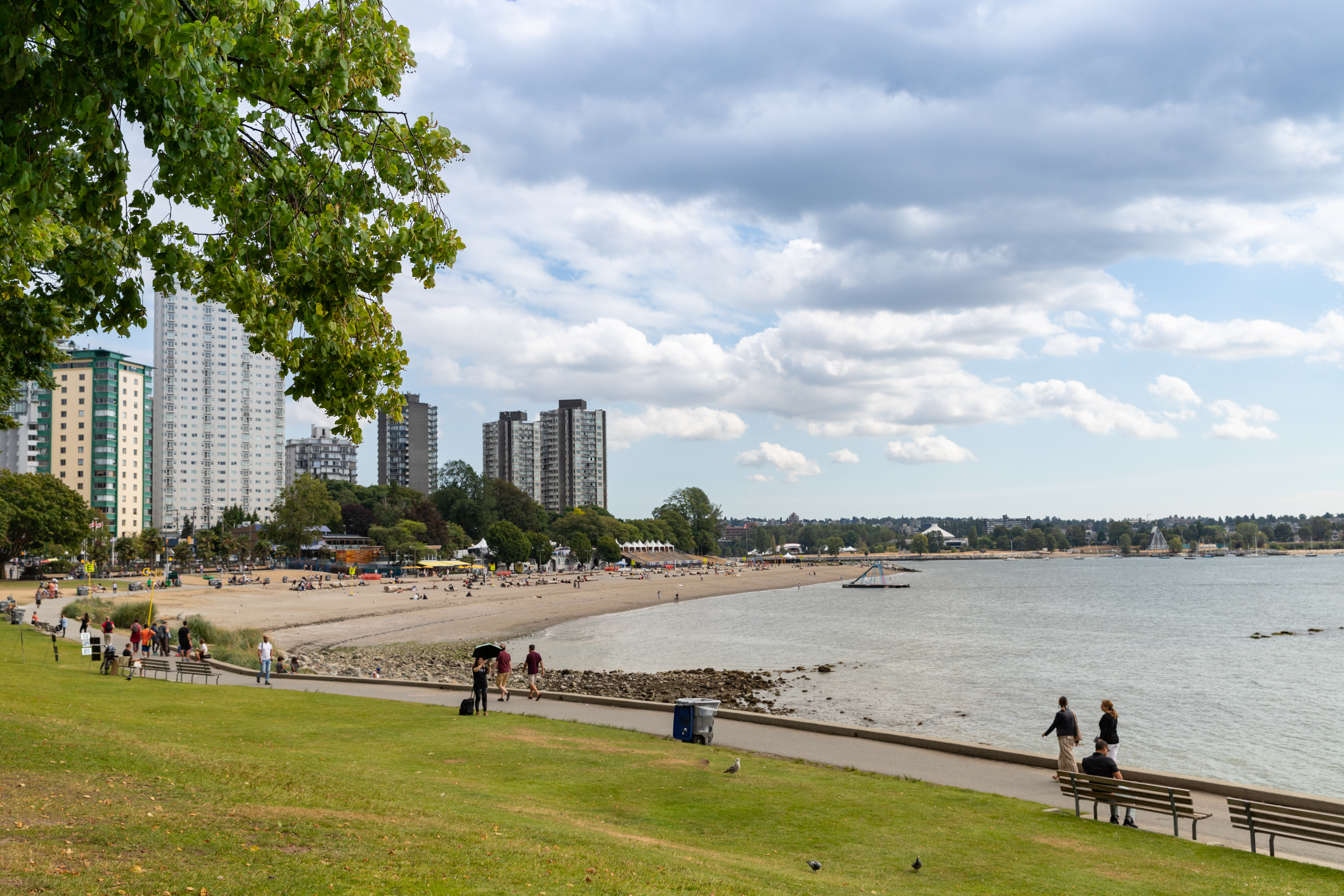
English Bay Vancouver

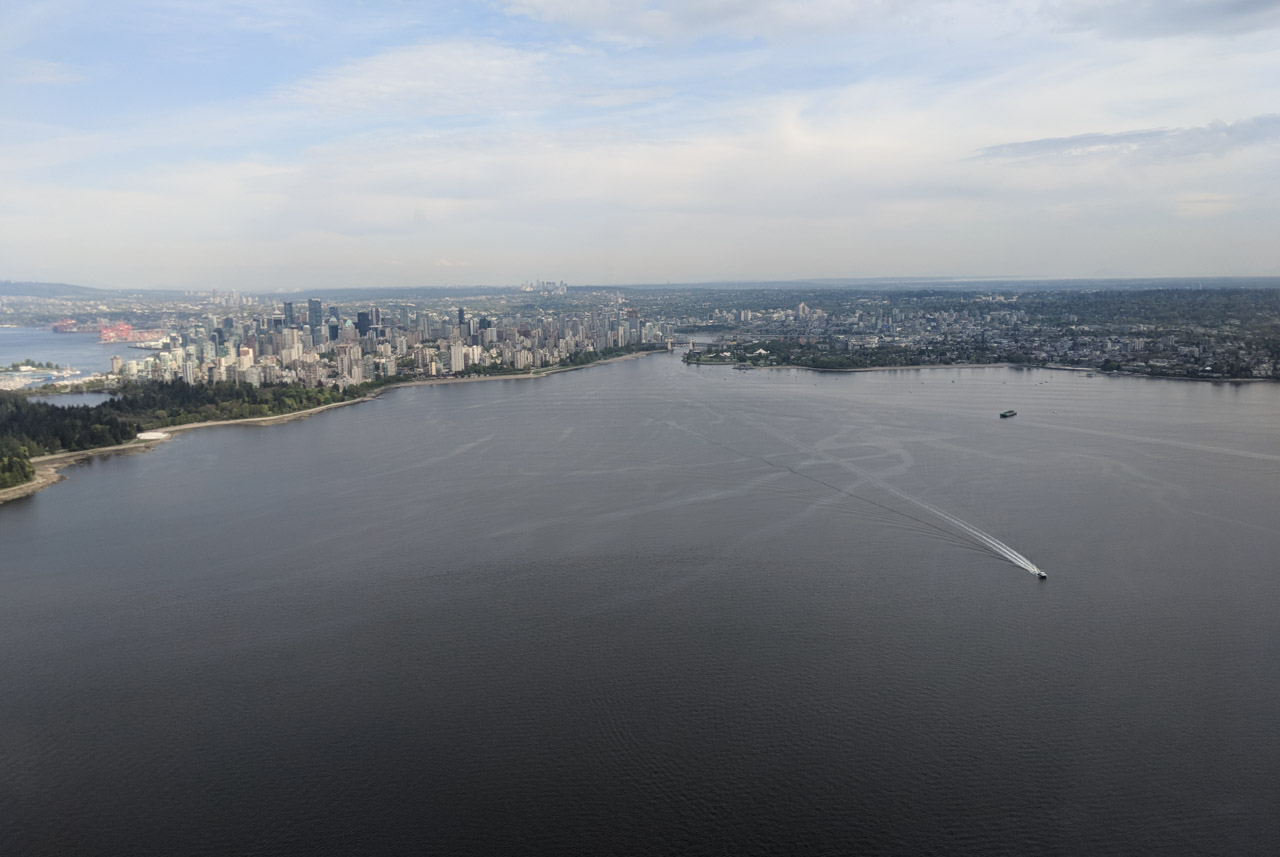
Aerial photo of English Bay looking east, including downtown, the West End, and Kitsilano
