= Coat of arms of Vancouver =

Heraldic emblem of the city

- Armiger: Vancouver
- Adopted: 1969
- Crest: Issuant from a mural crown per pale or and azure masoned sable a ship's mast proper bearing a filled sail argent and a pennant vert
- Helmet: A Gentleman's helm mantled azure doubled argent
- Shield: Barry wavy of eight azure and argent on a chief or two dogwood flowers proper overall on a pile vert a totem pole of Kwakiutl design embodying representations of an eagle grizzly bear and halibut Or
- Supporters: Dexter a logger proper bearing an axe in the dexter hand, sinister a fisherman proper bearing a fishing net in the sinister hand
- Motto: "By Sea Land and Air We Prosper"

The coat of arms of Vancouver was granted by the College of Arms on 31 March 1969.

== History ==
The city of Vancouver assumed its first municipal seal upon incorporation in 1886. Designed by City Alderman Lauchlan Hamilton, it was pictorial in nature depicting a tree, a sailing ship and a train, and did not conform to any rules of heraldry. The seal was in use until 1903, when a new armorial achievement was assumed. Designed by James Blomfield, it contains many of the elements used in the current coat of arms: the pile (charged here with a caduceus), the logger and the fisherman as supporters, and the wavy bars alluding to the ocean. It also retains the motto from the previous emblem, By Sea Land and Air We Prosper.

The development of the current coat of arms started in 1928, when the city council attempted to register the arms designed by Blomfield with the College of Arms. The college rejected the registration. Between 1928 and 1932, a committee sat occasionally before shelving the issue. In 1962, the matter was reopened. Members of city staff visited the college to go over the design of the arms, assisted by the Chester Herald, Walter Verco. The grant of arms, as well as a badge derived from the arms, was finally approved on 31 March 1969 and presented to Vancouver City Council the following January.

== Symbolism ==
- Crest: A Ship signifying Vancouver's importance as a seaport, upon a mural crown, the traditional heraldic emblem for a city.
- Shield: The dogwood flowers in the chief are a symbol of the province (they can also be found in the compartment of the coat of arms of British Columbia). The main charge is a Kwakiutl totem pole, symbol of the area's native heritage, surmounting wavy ribbons of blue and silver (for the waters surrounding the city).
- Supporters: A logger and a fisherman, standing for the traditional industries of the area.
- Motto: By Sea Land and Air We Prosper; the word "air" was added to the existing motto to acknowledge the growing importance of aviation to Vancouver's development.

== Derived symbols ==
The mural crown from the crest forms the basis for the city badge. Inside the crown is an axe and an oar placed in saltire, alluding to the same two industries (logging and fishing) represented by the supporters of the arms. The city badge is featured on the flag of Vancouver.

The shield of arms also serves as the central feature of the Vancouver Police Department's badge.

== See also ==
- Canadian heraldry
- National symbols of Canada
- List of Canadian provincial and territorial symbols
