= Jericho Beach =

Beach in Vancouver, British Columbia, Canada

Coordinates: 49.272°N 123.192°W

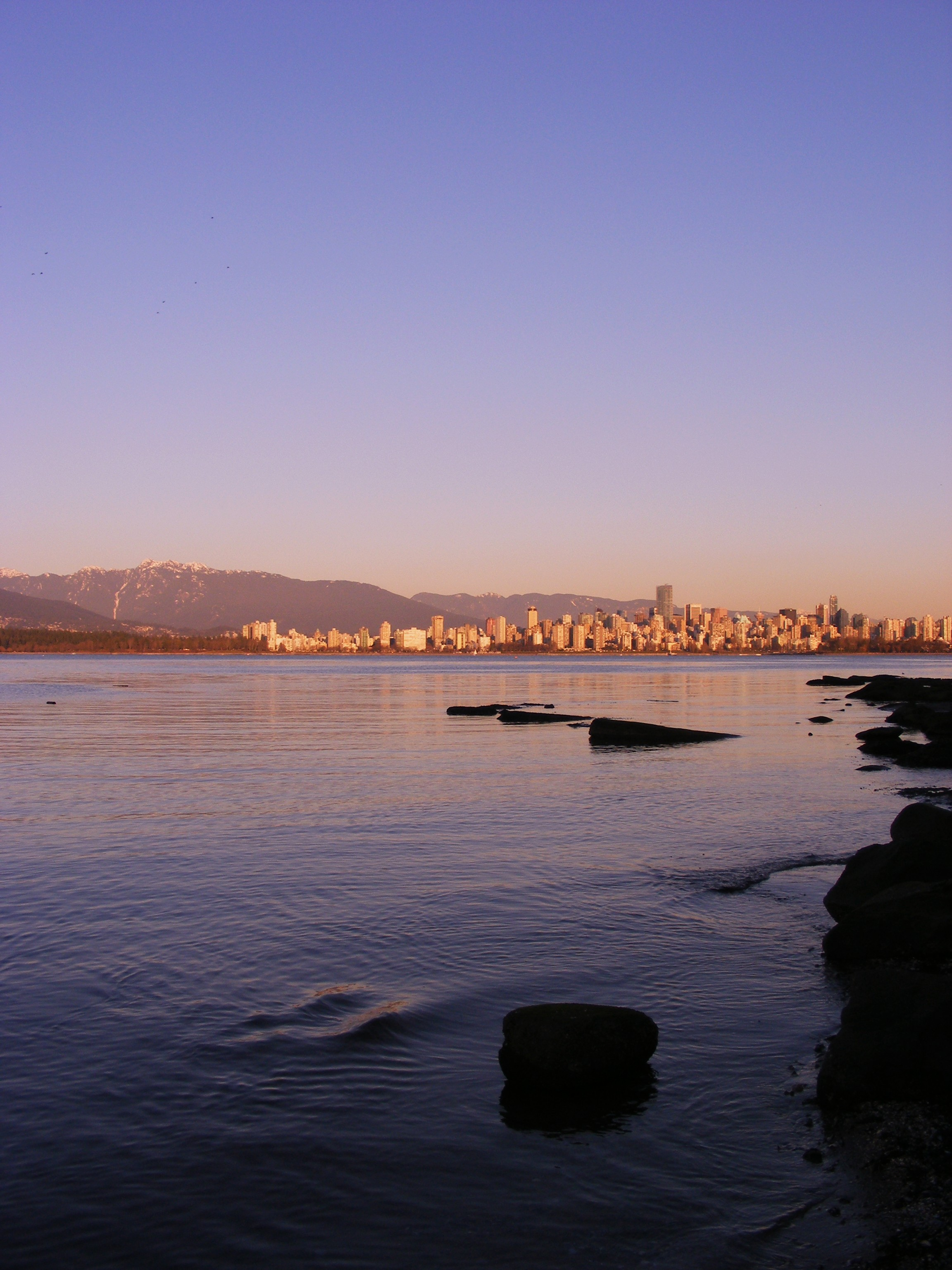
Downtown Vancouver, seen from Jericho Beach

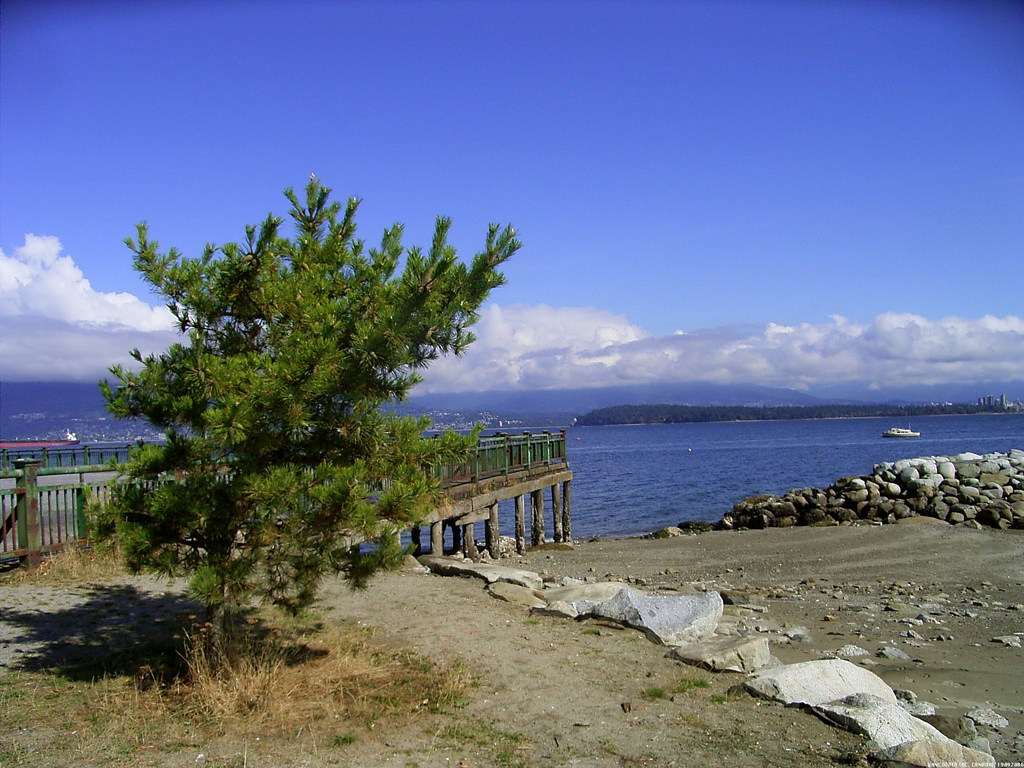

Jericho Beach (Squamish: Iy̓ál̓mexw, Hən̓q̓əmín̓əm̓: ʔəy̓alməxʷ) a Vancouver beach, is located west of the seaside neighbourhood of Kitsilano. It is surrounded by Jericho Beach Park, a grassy area with a pond, which is a picnic destination. Jericho Beach is the home of the Jericho Sailing Centre Association.

== Name ==
There are two explanations for the name Jericho Beach.

The first is that it derived from Jeremiah Rogers, a successful lumberman in the area; the area's name came to be "Jericho" as a corruption of either "Jerry's cove" or "Jerry& Co."

Alternatively, the name is from Jericho Charlie, Shenáwtsut, who owned a cedar long house on these lands.

== Jericho Beach ==
The beach is home to concessions, soccer and baseball fields, picnic tables, public washrooms, among other amenities like beach volleyball nets. Also, there are lifeguards on duty for beach safety from late May to early September. It is home to the Jericho Works Yard for the Vancouver Parks Board, a youth hostel, the annual Vancouver Folk Music Festival and the Jericho Sailing Centre.

== Jericho Beach Park ==
Jericho Beach Park is a park that is near Jericho Beach. The park includes a pond, a tennis court, and many picnic areas. Along with Locarno Beach Park (which is a park adjacent to Jericho Beach Park), Jericho Beach Park is home to many animals throughout the year such as coyotes, beavers, turtles, as well as a large population of invasive feral rabbits that have descended from domestic rabbits that were either released or escaped into the park.

== Jericho Beach Flying Boat Station ==
Jericho Beach Flying Boat Station was the first Canadian Air Force station in British Columbia and, in 1924 when the Canadian Air Force became '"Royal", the first Royal Canadian Air Force station in the province. It operated from 1920–1947. An educational monument at the Jericho Beach Flying Boat Station was installed by 801 (Vancouver) Wing, Air Force Association of Canada; Air Crew Association (Vancouver Branch); Air Force Officers Association and the British Columbia Veterans Commemorative Association. The old headquarters building is now used by 39 Canadian Brigade Group.
