= Squamish language =

Coast Salish language spoken in Canada

Squamish
- Sḵwx̱wú7mesh sníchim
- Pronunciation: [sqʷχʷoʔməʃ snit͡ʃim]
- Native to: Canada
- Region: British Columbia
- Ethnicity: 4,700 Squamish people (2022, FPCC)
- Native speakers: 45 (2021 census)
- Revival: 349 active learners (2022)
- Language family: Salishan: Coast Salish; Central; Squamish
- Writing system: Latin (Sḵwx̱wú7mesh alphabet)

Official status
- Official language in: Sḵwx̱wú7mesh Úxwumixw

Language codes
- ISO 639-3: squ
- Glottolog: squa1248
- ELP: Sḵwx̱wú7mesh sníchim (Squamish)
- Squamish Territory

- Squamish is classified as Critically Endangered by the UNESCO Atlas of the World's Languages in Danger.

- Person: Sḵwx̱wú7mesh
- People: Sḵwx̱wú7mesh
- Language: Skwxwú7mesh sníchim
- Country: Skwxwú7mesh-ulh Temíxw

Squamish (/ˈskwɔːmɪʃ/ SKWAW-mish; Sḵwx̱wú7mesh sníchim, sníchim meaning 'language') is a Coast Salish language spoken by the Squamish people of the Pacific Northwest. It is spoken in southwestern British Columbia, Canada, centred on their reserve communities in Squamish, North Vancouver, and West Vancouver. An archaic historical rendering of the native Sḵwx̱wú7mesh is Sko-ko-mish but this should not be confused with the name of the Skokomish people of Washington state. Squamish is most closely related to the Sechelt, Halkomelem, and Nooksack languages.

The Squamish language was first documented in the 1880s by German anthropologist Franz Boas; however the grammar of the language was documented by the Dutch linguist Aert Kuipers in the 1960s. The orthography or spelling system of the language came about in the 1960s, while the first Squamish dictionary was published only in 2011. The language shares certain similarities with languages like Sechelt and Halkomelem which are spoken in similar regions.

== Documentation ==
Anthropologists and linguists have been researching the Squamish language since the 1880s. After some time a written system was formed for the Squamish language, which was once an oral language. German anthropologist Franz Boas was the first to collect Squamish words, while anthropologist Charles Hill-Tout recorded some Squamish sentences and stories. In the 1930s, anthropologist Homer Barnett worked with Jimmy Frank to collect information about traditional Squamish culture, including some Squamish words. In the 1950s, Dutch linguist Aert H. Kuipers worked on the first comprehensive grammar of the Squamish language, later published as The Squamish Language (1967). In 1968, the British Columbia Language Project undertook more documentation of the Squamish language and culture. The Squamish writing system presently in use was devised by Randy Bouchard and Dorothy Kennedy, the main collaborators on this project, using a modified Latin script called Sḵwx̱wú7mesh (1990). The Squamish-English bilingual dictionary (edited by Peter Jacobs and Damara Jacobs) was published by the University of Washington Press in 2011.

== Use and language revitalization efforts ==
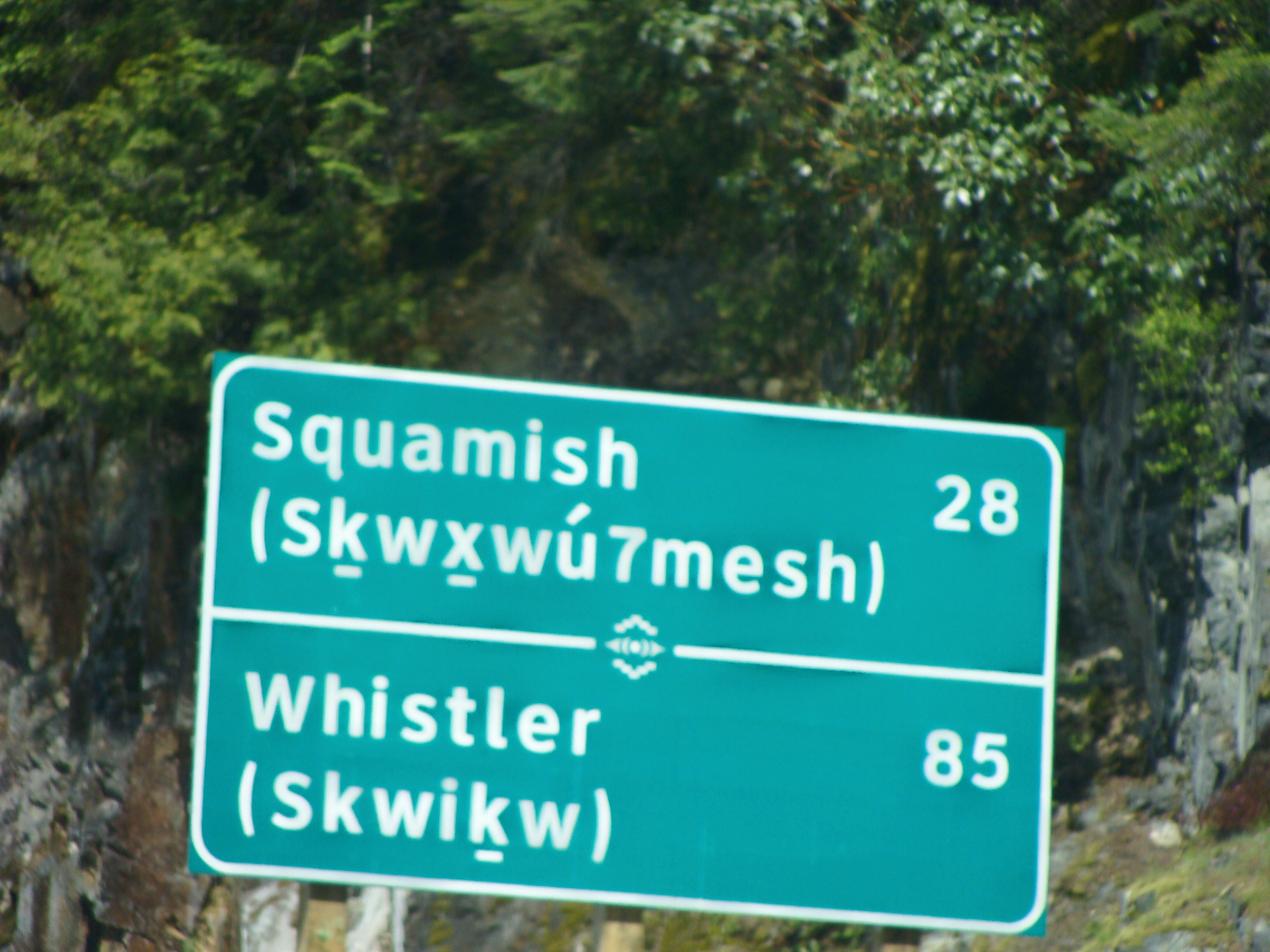
Bilingual road sign in Squamish and English languages, on Highway 99

In 1990, the Chief and Council of the Squamish people declared Squamish to be the official language of their people, a declaration made to ensure funding for the language and its revitalization. In 2010, the First Peoples' Heritage, Language and Culture Council considered the language to be "critically endangered" and "nearly extinct", with just 10 fluent speakers. In 2011, the language was being taught using the "Where Are Your Keys?" technique, and a Squamish–English dictionary was also completed in 2011.

A Squamish festival was scheduled for April 22, 2013, with two fluent elders, aiming to inspire more efforts to keep the language alive. Rebecca Campbell, one of the event's organizers, commented:

The festival is part of a multi-faceted effort to ensure the language's long-term survival, not only by teaching it in the schools, but by encouraging parents to speak it at home. Squamish Nation cultural workers, for example, have begun to provide both parents and children with a list of common Squamish phrases that can be used around the home, as a way to reinforce the learning that takes place in the Sea to Sky School District schools. So far 15 families in the Squamish area are part of the program ... "The goal is to revive the language by trying to have it used every day at home—getting the parents on board, not just the children."

Currently, there are 449 Active Language Learners of the Squamish language. In 2014, a Squamish-language program was made available at Capilano University. The program, Language and Culture Certificate, is designed to let its respective students learn about the language and culture. Additionally, Simon Fraser University has launched the Squamish Language Academy, in which students learn the Squamish language for two years. The aforementioned programs increase the number of active language learners each year.

== Phonology ==
=== Vowels ===
The vowel system in Squamish phonemically features four sounds, /i/, /a/, /u/, as well as a schwa sound /ə/, each with phonetic variants. There is a fair amount of overlap between the vowel spaces, with stress and adjacency relationships as main contributors. The vowel phonemes of Squamish are listed below in IPA with the orthography following it.

	Front	Central	Back
High	i ⟨i⟩		u ⟨u⟩
Open-mid		ə ⟨e⟩	
Low		a ⟨a⟩	

==== Vowel variants ====
/i/ has four main allophones [e, ɛ, ɛj, i], which surface depending on adjacency relationships to consonants, or stress.

- [ɛ] surfaces preceding uvular consonants, and can exist in a non-adjacent relationship so long as no other vowels intervene. [ɛj] surfaces proceeding a uvular consonant, before a non-uvular consonant.
- [e] surfaces in non-uvular environments when /i/ is in stressed syllables.

/a/ has four main allophones [ɛ, æ, ɔ, ɑ].

- [ɛ, æ] surfaces when palatals are present (with the exception of /j/
- [ɔ] surfaces when labial/labialized consonants are present (with the exception of /w/.
- [a] surfaces when not in the prior conditions. Stress usually does not change the vowel.

/u/

- [o] surfaces in stressed syllables.

=== Consonants ===
The consonant phonemes of Squamish, first in IPA and then in the Squamish orthography:

		Labial	Alveolar			Post- alveolar	Velar		Uvular		Glottal
		Labial	plain	sibilant	lateral	Post- alveolar	plain	labial	plain	labial	Glottal
Plosive/ Affricate	plain	p ⟨p⟩	t ⟨t⟩	t͡s ⟨ts⟩		t͡ʃ ⟨ch⟩	(k ⟨k⟩)	kʷ ⟨kw⟩	q ⟨ḵ⟩	qʷ ⟨ḵw⟩	ʔ ⟨7⟩
Plosive/ Affricate	ejective	pʼ ⟨pʼ⟩	tʼ ⟨tʼ⟩	t͡sʼ ⟨tsʼ⟩	t͡ɬʼ ⟨tlʼ⟩	t͡ʃʼ ⟨chʼ⟩	(kʼ ⟨kʼ⟩)	kʷʼ ⟨kwʼ⟩	qʼ ⟨ḵʼ⟩	qʷʼ ⟨ḵwʼ⟩	ʔ ⟨7⟩
Fricative				s ⟨s⟩	ɬ ⟨lh⟩	ʃ ⟨sh⟩		xʷ ⟨xw⟩	χ ⟨x̱⟩	χʷ ⟨x̱w⟩	h ⟨h⟩
Sonorant	plain	m ⟨m⟩	n ⟨n⟩		l ⟨l⟩	j ⟨y⟩		w ⟨w⟩			
Sonorant	glottalized	m̰ ⟨m̓⟩	n̰ ⟨n̓⟩		l̰ ⟨l̓⟩	j̰ ⟨y̓⟩		w̰ ⟨w̓⟩			

=== Modifiers ===
Other symbols include the glottal stop and stress marks.

⟨ʔ⟩ or 7 represent a glottal stop. Glottalization can occur on a variety of consonants (w, y, l, m, n), and after or before vowels. Glottalized sonorants are written with an apostrophe on top, whereas ejectives are written with an apostrophe after.

== Orthography ==
The following table shows the vowels and consonants and their respective orthographic symbols. Consonants are sorted by place (bilabial to uvular descending) and type (Left – Plosives, Right – Sonorants and Fricatives). Squamish contains no voiced plosives, as is typical of Salish language family languages. Because the /ʔ/ character glyph is not found on typewriters and did not exist in most fonts until the widespread adoption of Unicode, the Squamish orthography conventionally represents the glottal stop with the number symbol 7; the same character glyph is also used as a digit to represent the number seven.

The other special character is a stress mark, or accent (á, é, í or ú). This indicates that the vowel should be realized as louder and slightly longer.

Phoneme	Orthography	Phoneme	Orthography
Vowels
/i/	i	/u/	u
/ə/	e	/a/	a
Consonants
/p/	p	/m/	m
/pʼ/	pʼ	/ˀm/	m̓
/t/	t	/n/	n
/tʼ/	tʼ	/ˀn/	n̓
/ts/	ts	/s/	s
/tsʼ/	tsʼ	/l/	l
/tɬʼ/	tlʼ	/ˀl/	l̓
/tʃ/	ch	/ɬ/	lh
/tʃʼ/	chʼ	/ʃ/	sh
/k/	k	/j/	y
/kʼ/	kʼ	/ˀj/	y̓
/kʷ/	kw	/x/	x
/kʷʼ/	kwʼ	/xʷ/	xw
/q/	ḵ	/χ/	x̱
/qʼ/	ḵʼ	/χʷ/	x̱w
/qʷ/	ḵw	/h/	h
/qʷʼ/	ḵwʼ		
/ʔ/	7		

== Grammar ==
Squamish, like other Salish languages, has two main types of words: Clitics and full words. Clitics can be articles, or predicative clitics. Squamish words are able to be subjected to reduplication, suffixation, prefixation. A common prefix is the nominalizer prefix /s-/, which occurs in a large number of fixed combinations with verb stems to make nouns (e.g.: /t'iq/ "to be cold" -> /s-t'iq/ "(the) cold").

=== Reduplication ===
Squamish uses a variety of reduplication types, serving to express functions such as pluralization, diminutive form, aspect, etc. Squamish contains a large variety of reduplicative processes due to its lack of inflectional devices that would otherwise mark plurality, which allows for a range of different interpretations.

=== Syntax ===
Squamish sentences follow a Verb–Subject–Object form (the action precedes the initiator and the initiator of an action precedes the goal). Sentences typically begin with a predicate noun, but may also begin with a transitive, intransitive, or passive verb.

The table below summarizes the general order of elements in Squamish. Referents are nominal.

Order:	1	2	3	4	5
	Noun (predicate)		Subject		
	Verb (intransitive)	R2 (other referent related term)	Subject		R1(referent related term)
	Verb (Transitive)		Subject	Object	
	Verb (Passive)	R1(Initiator of action)	Subject		R2 (other referent related term)

== See also ==
- Squamish Nation
- History of Squamish and Tsleil-Waututh longshoremen, 1863–1963

== Bibliography ==
- Bar-el, Leora (1998). Verbal Plurality and Adverbial Quantification: A Case Study of Skwxú7mesh (Squamish) (MA thesis). University of British Columbia.
- Bar-el, Leora (2005). Aspectual Distinctions in Skwxwú7mesh (PhD thesis). University of British Columbia.
- Bar-el, Leora (2005). "Minimal and Maximal Events". In Armoskaite, S.; Thompson, J. (eds.). Proceedings of WSCLA 10. University of British Columbia Working Papers in Linguistics. Vol. 17. pp. 29–42.
- Bar-el, Leora; Davis, Henry; Matthewson, Lisa (2005). "On Non-Culminating Accomplishments". In Bateman, L.; Ussery, C. (eds.). Proceedings of the 35th NELS Conference. Amherst, MA: GLSA.
- Bar-el, Leora; Jacobs, Peter; Wiltschko, Martina (2001). "A [+Interpretable] Number Feature in Squamish Salish". In Megerdoomian, Karine; Bar-el, Leora (eds.). Proceedings of WCCFL 20. Los Angeles: University of Southern California. pp. 43–55.
- Bar-el, Leora; Watt, Linda T. (1998). "What Determines Stress in Skwxwú7mish (Squamish)?" (PDF). ICSNL. 33: 407–427.
- Bar-el, Leora; Watt, Linda T. (2001). "Word Internal Constituency in Skwxwú7mesh (Squamish Salish". In Gessner, S.; Oh, S.; Shiobara, K. (eds.). Proceedings of WSCLA 5. UBCWPL. Vol. 5. pp. 3–18.
- Burton, Strang; Davis, Henry; Jacobs, Peter; Watt, Linda Tamburri; Wiltschko, Martina (2001). "A Boy, a Dog, and a Frog" (PDF). ICSNL 36. UBCWPL. Vol. 6. pp. 37–54.
- Currie, Elizabeth (1996). "Five Sqwuxwu7mish Futures" (PDF). Proceedings of the International Conference on Salishan and Neighboring Languages. Vol. 31. pp. 23–28.
- Darnell, Michael (1990). "Squamish /-m/ Constructions". Berkeley Linguistics Society. 16: 19–31.
- Darnell, Michael (1997). A Functional Analysis of Voice in Squamish (PhD thesis). Milwaukee: University of Wisconsin.
- Davis, Stuart (1984a). Moras, Light Syllable Stress and Stress Clash in Squamish. WCCFL. Vol. 3. pp. 62–74.
- Davis, Stuart (1984b). "Squamish Stress Clash". In Davis, S. (ed.). Coyote Papers: Studies on Native American Languages, Japanese and Spanish. Tucson: University of Arizona. pp. 2–18.
- Demers, Richard; Horn, George (July 1978). "Stress Assignment in Squamish". International Journal of American Linguistics. 44 (3): 180–191. doi:10.1086/465543.
- Déchaine, Rose-Marie; Wiltschko, Martina (2002). "The Position of Negation and its Consequences". In Bar-el, L.; Watt, L.; Wilson, I. (eds.). Proceedings of WSCLA 7. UBCWPL. Vol. 10. pp. 29–42.
- Demirdache, Hamida; Gardiner, Dwight; Jacobs, Peter; Matthewson, Lisa (1994). "The Case for D-Quantification in Salish: 'All' in St'át'imcets, Squamish, and Secwepmectsin". Papers for the 29th International Conference on Salish and Neighboring Languages. Pablo, Montana: Salish Kootenai College. pp. 145–203.
- Galloway, Brent (1996). An Etymological Analysis of the 59 Squamish and Halkomelem Place Names on Burrard Inlet Analyzed in Suttles Report of 1996. [Material filed in evidence in the land claims cases of Mathias vs. HMQ, Grant, and George; Grant vs. HMQ and Mathias; and George vs. HMQ and Mathias.]
- Gillon, Carrie (1998). "Extraction from Skwxwú7mesh relative clauses.". In Lee, K.-J.; Oliveira, M. (eds.). Proceedings of the 14th Northwest Linguistics Conference. pp. 11–20.
- Gillon, Carrie (March 23–25, 2001). Negation and Subject Agreement in Skwxwú7mesh (Squamish Salish. Workshop on the Structure and Constituency of the Languages of the Americas 6. Memorial University of Newfoundland.
- Gillon, Carrie (2006a). "DP structure and semantic composition in Skwxwú7mesh (Squamish)". In Bateman, L.; Ussery, C. (eds.). Proceedings of the North East Linguistic Society. Vol. 35. pp. 231–244.
- Gillon, Carrie (2006b). Kiyota, M.; Thompson, J.; Yamane-Tanaka, N. (eds.). Deictic features: evidence from Skwxwú7mesh determiners and demonstratives. UBCWPL. Vol. 41: Papers for the International Conference on Salish and Neighbouring Languages (ICSNL). pp. 146–179.
- Gillon, Carrie (2009). "Deictic Features: Evidence from Skwxwú7mesh". International Journal of American Linguistics. 75 (1): 1–27. doi:10.1086/598201.
- Gillon, Carrie (2013). The Semantics of Determiners: Domain Restriction in Skwxwú7mesh. Newcastle upon Tyne: Cambridge Scholars Publishing.
- Gillon, Carrie; Wiltschko, Martina (2004). Brown, J.C.; Peterson, T. (eds.). Missing determiners/complementizers in wh-questions: Evidence from Skwxwú7mesh and Halq'eméylem. UBCWPL. Vol. 14: Papers for ICSNL 39.
- Jacobs, Peter (1992). Subordinate Clauses in Squamish: a Coast Salish Language (MA thesis). University of Oregon.
- Jacobs, Peter (1994). "The Inverse in Squamish". In Givón, Talmy (ed.). Voice and Inversion. Amsterdam: Benjamins. pp. 121–146.
- Jacobs, Peter (2012). Vowel harmony and schwa strengthening in Skwxwu7mesh. UBC Working Papers in Linguistics. Vol. 32.
- Jacobs, Peter; et al., eds. (2011). Squamish-English Dictionary. University of Washington Press.
- Kuipers, Aert H. (1967). The Squamish Language. The Hague: Mouton.
- Kuipers, Aert H. (1968). "The categories noun-verb and transitive-intransitive in English and Squamish". Lingua. 21: 610–626. doi:10.1016/0024-3841(68)90080-6.
- Kuipers, Aert H. (1969). The Squamish Language. Vol. 2. The Hague: Mouton.
- Nakayama, Toshihide (1991). "On the Position of the Nominalizer in Squamish" (PDF). Proceedings of the International Conference on Salishan and Neighboring Languages 26. pp. 293–300.
- Shipley, Dawn (1995). "A structural semantic analysis of kinship terms in the Squamish language" (PDF). Proceedings of the International Conference on Salishan and Neighboring Languages 30.
- Watt, Linda Tamburri; Alford, Michael; Cameron-Turley, Jen; Gillon, Carrie; Jacobs, Peter (2000). Skwxwú7mesh (Squamish Salish) Stress: A Look at the Acoustics of /a/ and /u/ (PDF). International Conference on Salishan and Neighboring Languages 35. University of British Columbia Working Papers in Linguistics. Vol. 3. pp. 199–217.
