= Museum of Vancouver =

Coordinates: 49°16′34″N 123°08′38″W

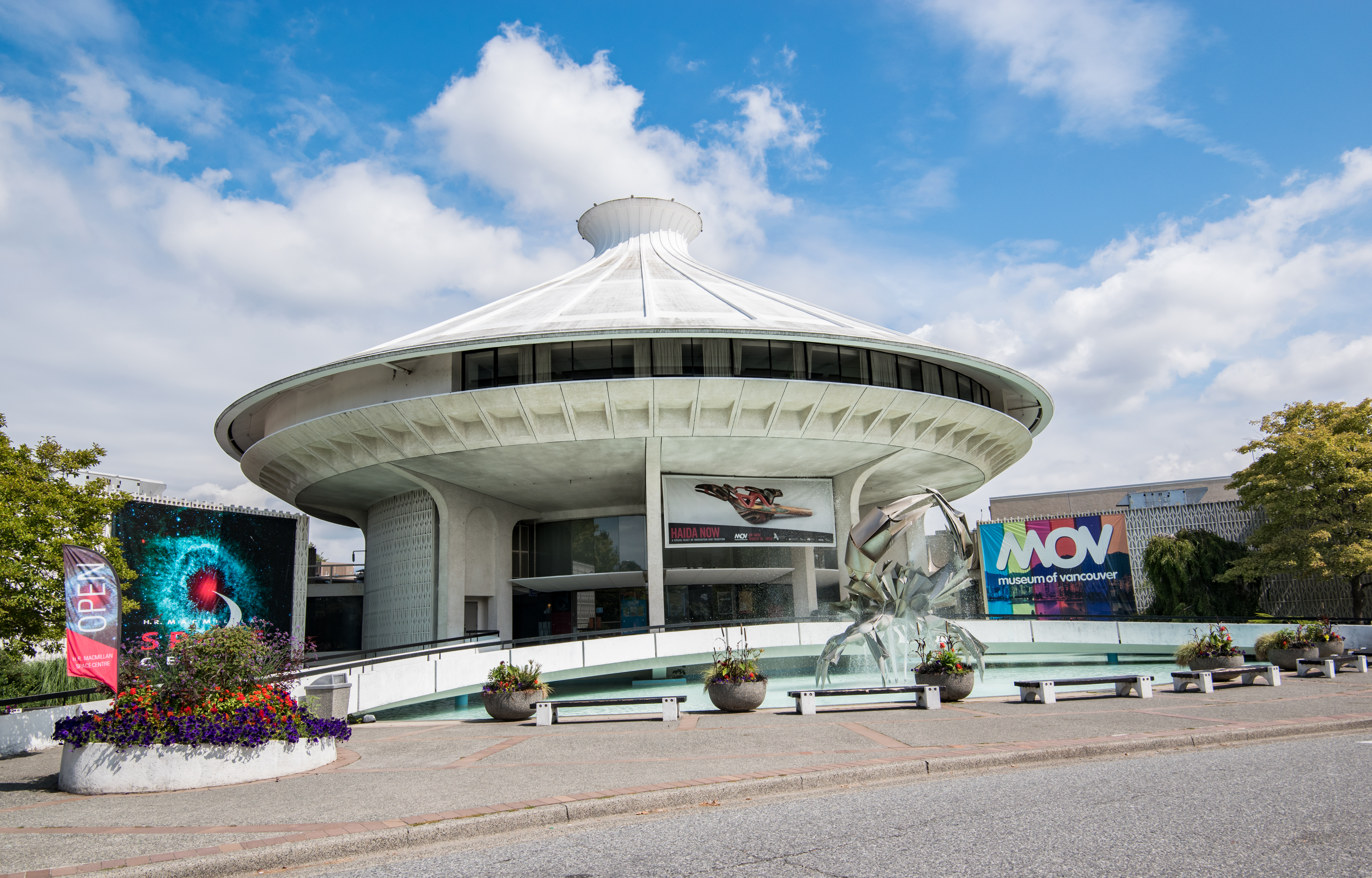
- Established: 1894
- Location: Vancouver, British Columbia, Canada
- Type: Civic museum
- Visitors: 78,101 (2018)
- Director: Ryan Hunt - CEO
- Curators: Viviane Gosselin, Wendy Nichols, Sharon Fortney, Denise Fong, Christine Pennington
- Website: museumofvancouver.ca

The Museum of Vancouver (MOV) (formerly the Vancouver Museum and prior to that the Centennial Museum) is a civic history museum located in Vanier Park, Vancouver, British Columbia. MOV is the largest urban museum in Canada and the oldest museum in Vancouver. The museum was founded in 1894 and went through a number of iterations before being rebranded as the Museum of Vancouver in 2009. It creates Vancouver-focused exhibitions and programs that encourage conversations about what Vancouver was, is, and can be. It shares an entrance and foyer with the H. R. MacMillan Space Centre but MOV is much larger and occupies the majority of the space in the building complex where both organizations sit, as well as separate collections storage facilities in another building.

The Museum of Vancouver states that its mission is to "be a gathering space that fosters connection, learning, and new experiences of Vancouver’s diverse communities and histories." MOV has approximately 80,000 objects in its collection, roughly 90% of which are photographed and accessible through the museum's online database. The museum actively works to repatriate objects in its collection associated with Indigenous Peoples, establishing an official repatriation policy in 2006 that was later updated in 2020. MOV launched an exhibition in 2025, entitled The Work of Repair: Redress and Repatriation at the Museum of Vancouver, that focuses on how the museum is working towards repatriation, community engagement, and research that reconnects Indigenous belongings to their histories.

== History ==
The museum was founded by the Art, Historical, and Scientific Association of Vancouver (AHSA), which formed on April 17, 1894, with the objective of cultivating "a taste for the beauties and refinements in life." Shortly after its inaugural meeting the AHSA opened its first temporary exhibition ('Paintings and Curiosities') in rented premises on the top floor of the Dunn Building on Granville Street, Vancouver. This exhibition triggered a series of donations to the new museum's collections which were mostly natural history or ethnographic in origin. The first recorded donation to the collection was of taxidermy - a stuffed Trumpeter Swan which was donated by Mr Sydney Williams in 1895. Regular purchasing of artefacts for the collections of the AHSA began in 1898 and acquisitions were eclectic and multi-disciplinary reflecting the interests of the decision-makers rather than any strategic approach to collecting.

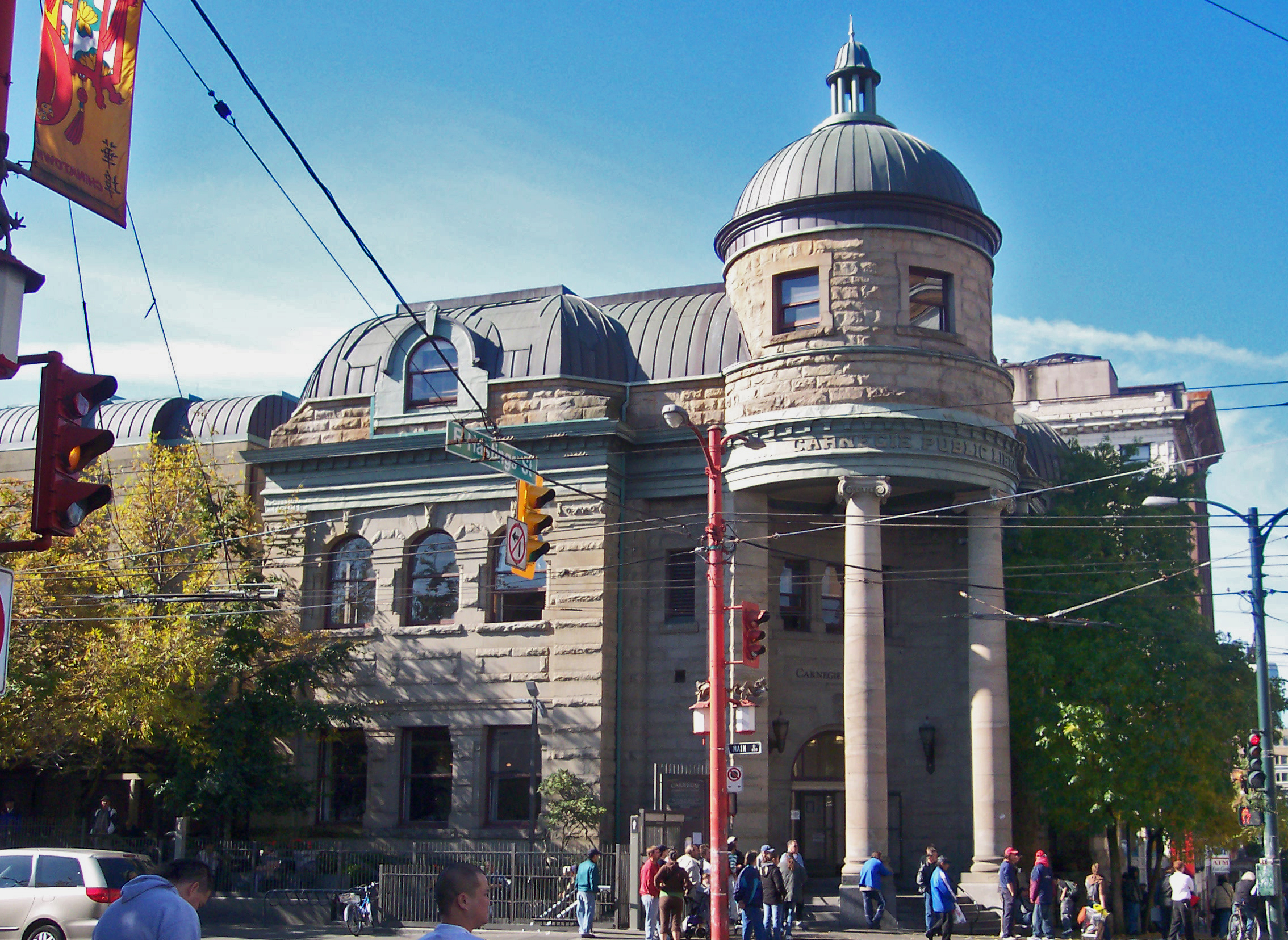
The museum opened in 1905, at the top floor of the Carnegie Library.

As the collection grew the question was raised as to a permanent place to display it and following discussions with the Vancouver City Council agreement was reached on August 26, 1903 that title to the museum collection would pass to the Council in exchange for the provision of suitable and convenient premises where they could be displayed. It was agreed at the same time that the new museum would be located on the top floor of the new Carnegie Library. The museum opened at this location on April 19, 1905.

Between 1915 and 1925 the museum and the AHSA attempted to establish in Stanley Park a reconstructed First Nations village built around a series of major totem and house poles that had been acquired by the AHSA. This project ultimately failed but it did result in the current display of totem poles in Stanley Park which remain one of the most photographed tourist attractions in Vancouver.

In 1930 the museum sponsored an extensive series of archaeological excavations of the Marpole Midden which was one of the most important archaeological sites on the Pacific Northwest Coast but was also an unceded ancestral territory of the Musqueam First Nation and was where the village of c̓əsnaʔəm (Musqueam Marpole Village Site) had been located. The outcome of this has been dealt with in the award-winning exhibition c̓əsnaʔəm, the city before the city, a joint project between the Musqueam Indian Band, the Museum of Vancouver and the Museum of Anthropology.

In 1957 the public library, which shared the Carnegie building with the museum, moved to a new dedicated building on Burrard Street, tripling the available storage and display space for the museum. In 1959 the museum was incorporated into the City Council and became a city department under the control of a Civic Museum Board. A report was commissioned on the future of the museum (the Heinrich Report of 1965) and this recommended the building of a new museum on the south shore of False Creek near the Burrard Bridge. Federal and provincial money was made available for the 1967 Confederation Centennial celebrations and the current building was constructed which opened to the public in October 1968. From the opening of the new building until 1981, the museum was branded as Centennial Museum, before reverting its name back to Vancouver Museum.

In 1972 the city council relinquished its control of the museum and a joint Museum and Planetarium Association was formed as a descendant of the original AHSA which founded the museum. In 1977 the museum was designated a Category A cultural institution by the federal government and named in the Cultural Property Export and Import Act.

In 2009, CEO Nancy Noble, with Amanda Gibbs leading public engagement, re-branded the organization as the Museum of Vancouver. This reflected a change of focus to the urban region rather than the lower mainland region of British Columbia as originally set out in its objectives and reaffirmed in 1977.

== Building ==
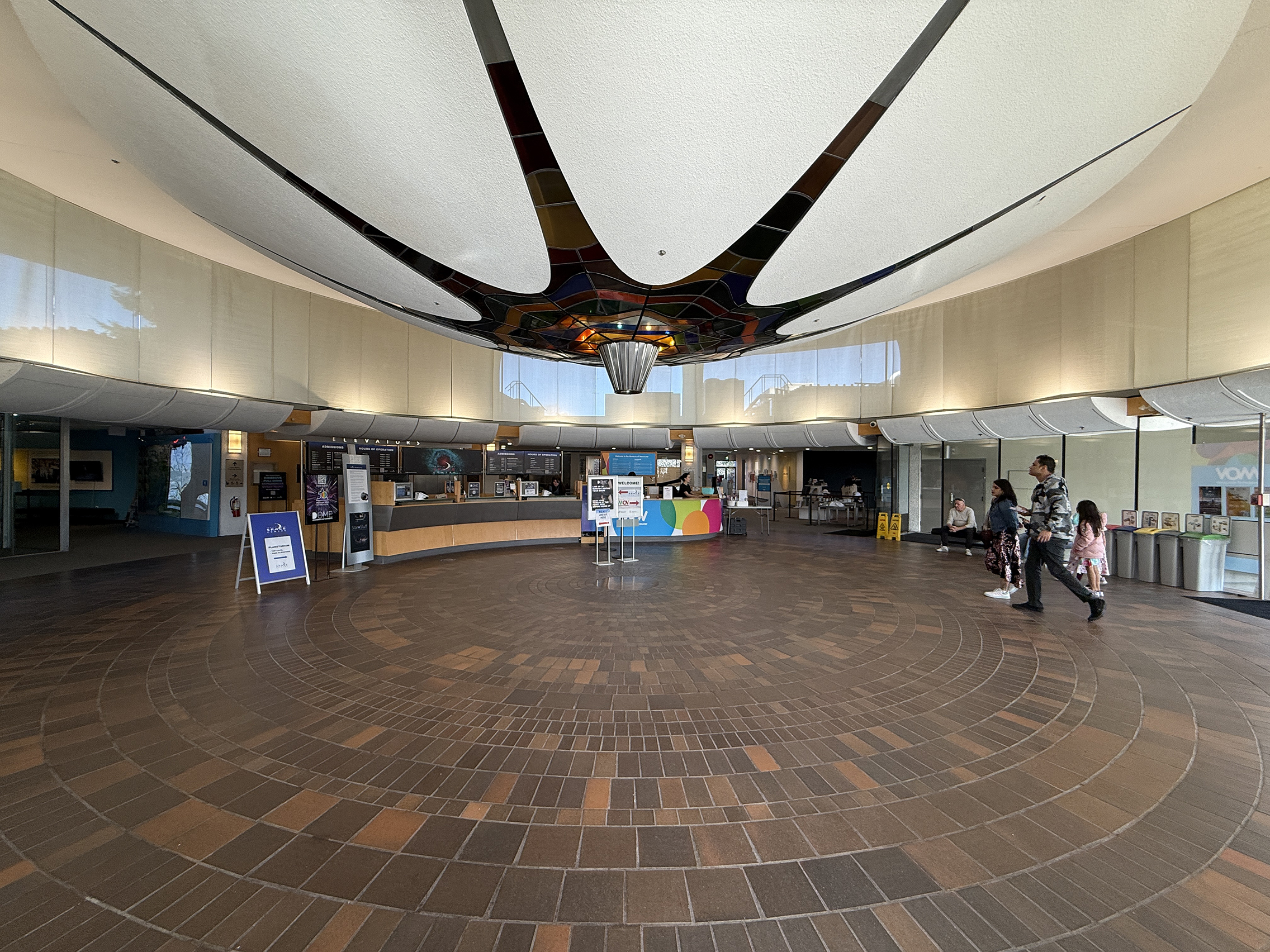
Lobby

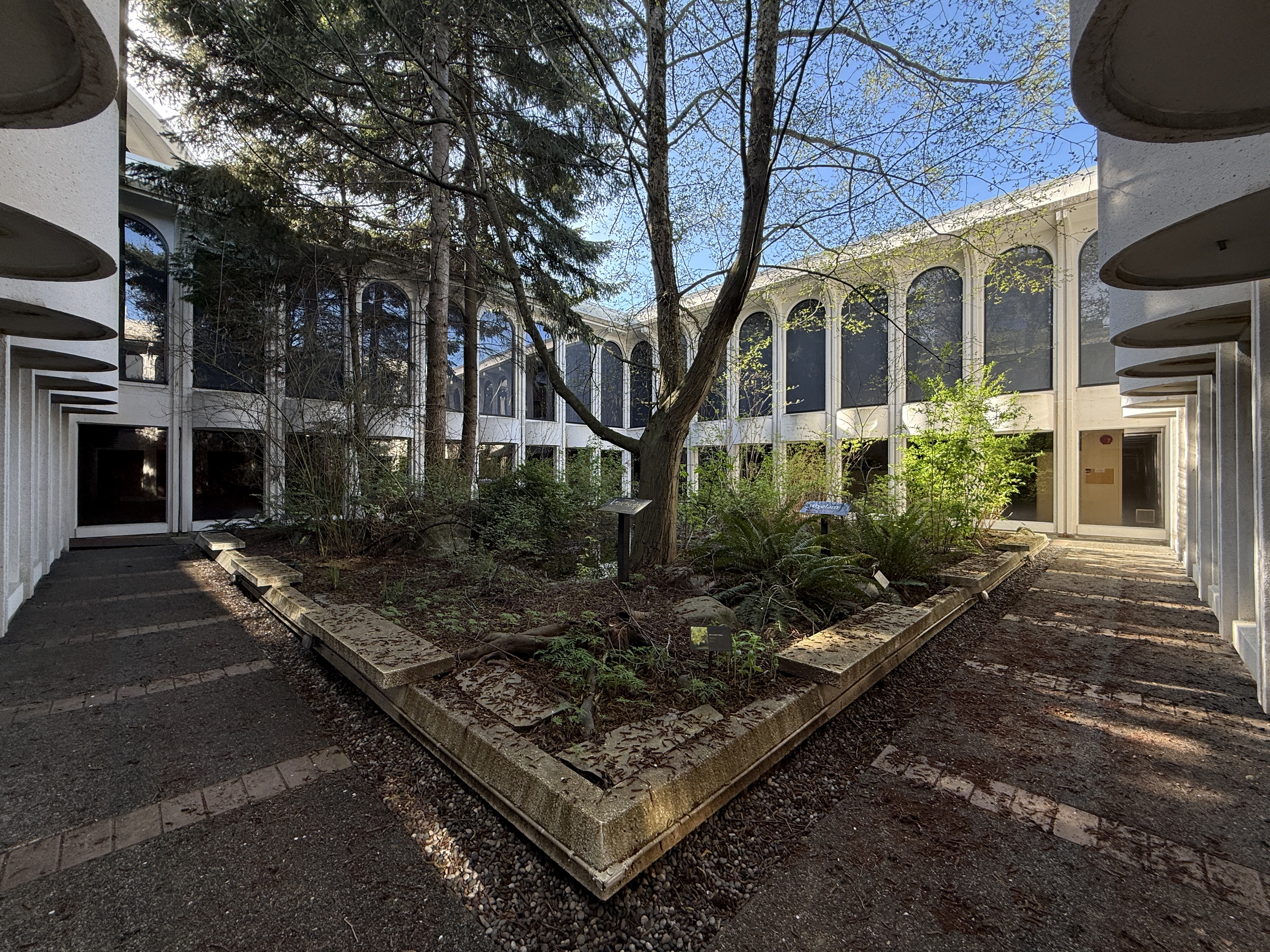
BC Native Plant Garden

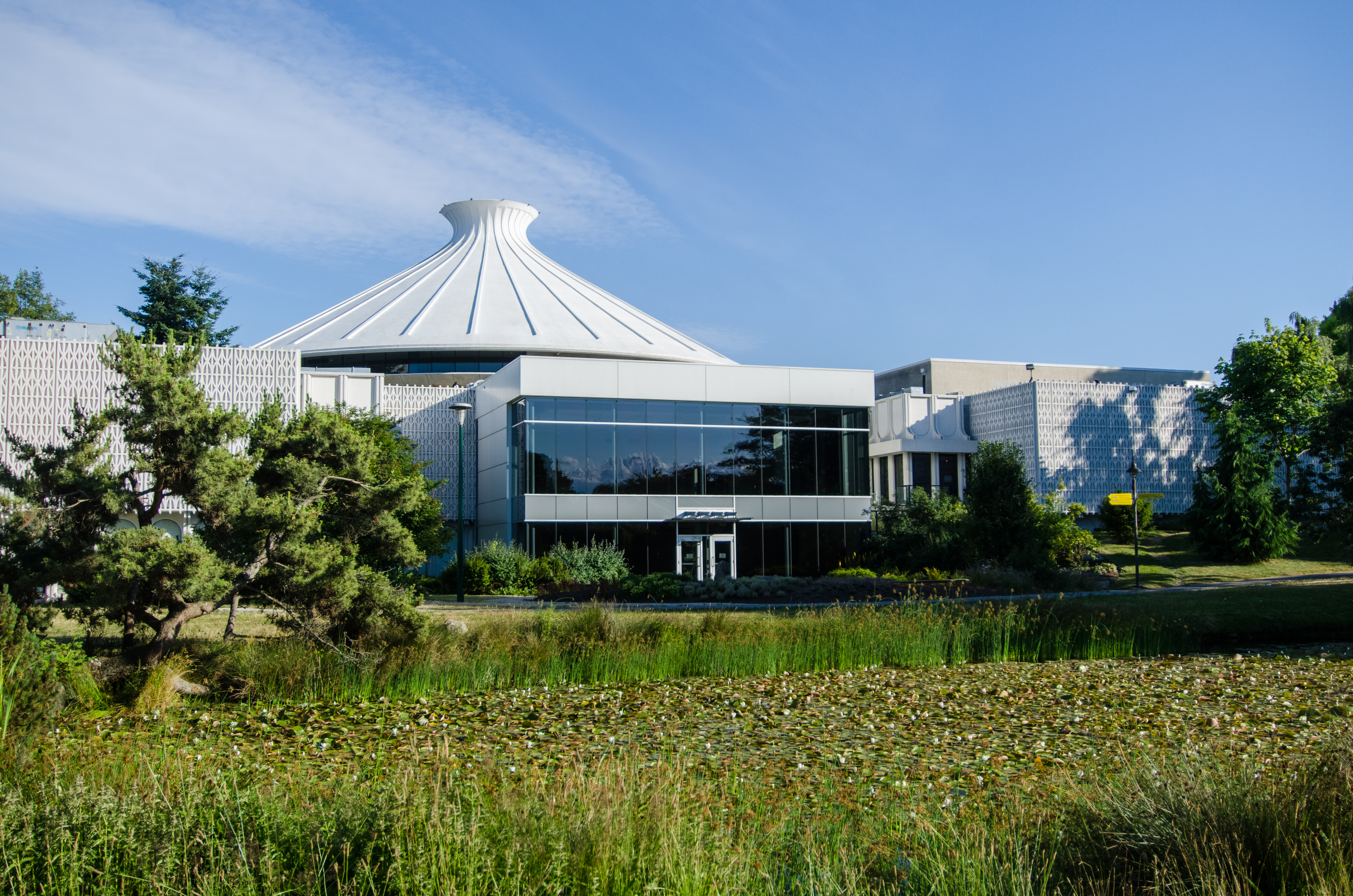
The Museum of Vancouver as seen from Vanier Park. The museum is situated at the southern portion of the park.

The building is located at 1100 Chestnut Street in Vanier Park, in the neighbourhood of Kitsilano in Vancouver, BC. The museum is situated at the south end of Vanier Park, with the park acting as a connecting green space between the Vancouver Maritime Museum, Bard on the Beach, the Vancouver Archives, and the Vancouver Academy of Music.

The building was constructed in 1967 to a design by the architect Gerald Hamilton who had studied at Leeds University before moving to Vancouver in 1950. Hamilton was a practitioner of the New Formalism school of architecture and its most visible proponent in Vancouver at the time.

Originally, the building was planned to only house a museum, but a generous gift by the lumber magnate H.R. MacMillan allowed the architect to incorporate a planetarium into the design. The distinctive roof was added as a pre-construction modification supposedly designed to reflect the shape of a woven basket hat made by Northwest Coast First Nations people. Because the roof also resembles a flying saucer, there has been ongoing confusion over the identity of the building, with many people mistakenly assuming it houses only the planetarium when much of the building is occupied by the Museum of Vancouver. The planetarium was renamed the H.R. MacMillan Space Centre in the late 1990s. The building was officially dedicated on May 20, 1967 and the ceremony was attended by Her Royal Highness Princess Alexandra, who was the granddaughter of Queen Mary and King George V and also a cousin of Queen Elizabeth II.

Alex Bozikovic remarks that the building closesly resembles the John Nugent Studio designed by Saskatchewan architect Clifford Wiens built six years earlier. Bozikovic was likely unaware that Gregory Dreicer had revealed in the MOV exhibition, Unbelievable (2017), that the building seemed to be directly modeled on the Annunciation Greek Orthodox Church in Wauwatosa, Wisconsin, designed by Frank Lloyd Wright and built in 1962. In the exhibition, Dreicer quoted architecture critic Trevor Boddy: “Myths people tell each other about buildings are forms of truth.” The building is considered iconic by Vancouverites and is one of the most immediately recognisable buildings in Vancouver. It was nicknamed 'the Taj Mahal on the creek' when first built and is characterised by its sweeping conical shape and reflecting pools crossed by curved pedestrian bridges.

== Collection ==
The museum has a large collection of objects which reflect to a large extent the interests of the donors and of the curators who made decisions on acquisitions over the years in a similar way to many museums that were established in this way. The collection is nationally significant but much of it remains in storage due to a lack of exhibition space.

The collection includes the First Nations and Oriental artefacts that were collected by Mary Lipsett who established along with her husband the Lipsett Indian Museum which opened in a former aquarium in the PNE grounds in 1941. This collection was said to be the finest in Canada when reported on by the Vancouver Sun in 1948 and Mary Lipsett was well-respected for her positive relationship with the First Nations and was honoured with the Kwawlewith name 'Ha-wini-po-la-o-gua', which means “a matriarch to whom many come for good counsel.” She donated the entire collection to the then Vancouver Museum and it remains in storage there.

Particular strengths in the MOV collection include but not all on display:

=== Ethnology ===
One of the most significant Pacific Northwest Coast First Nations collections in Canada with assemblages such as:

- Argillite carvings
- Small wooden carvings (mini totem poles, figures)
- Monumental wooden sculptures (totem poles, house posts)
- Baskets (extensive including Nuu-chah-nuith and Coast Salish)
- Objects carved by Charles Edenshaw including the Edenshaw Casket
- Glass slides painted by Frederick Alexcee
- Basket and bracelet collected by George Vancouver on his first voyage to the Pacific Northwest
- Selected masks, boxes, bowls, canoes, carvings, regalia
- Pauline Johnson's performance costume
- Human seated figure bowls and other anthropomorphic or zoomorphic carvings in stone

=== Asian antiquities ===
These include collections such as:

- Chinese art objects dating from the Shang dynasty (16th–11th century BCE) to the Qing dynasty (1644–1911) including a comprehensive ceramics collection from the Han dynasty (206 BCE–220 CE) to the Qing dynasty (1644–1911; a comprehensive coin collection; ivory carvings, jade carvings, lacquer objects, snuff bottles, textiles, and armor, largely form the Qing dynasty (1644–1911)
- Japanese objects dating from the Muromachi period (1392–1572) to the Meiji period (1868–1912) including woodblock prints, ceramics, ivory carvings, textiles, armour, swords, sword accessories, Buddhist and Shinto objects and dolls (20th century). The sword guard collection of over 400 items is the finest public collection in Canada.
- Indian, Nepalese and Tibetan stone, wood and bronze sculpture, textiles and paintings from the 16th to 20th century.
- Thai bronze Buddhist statues, Buddhist scriptures, textiles and ceramics dating from the 12th to the 20th century.
- Vietnamese and Cambodian ceramics.

=== Egyptian antiquities ===
These include:

- Ancient Egyptian collection, especially mummified boy (previously nicknamed 'Diana') discovered one mile from the Valley of the Kings near Luxor in 1915. The mummy wrappings are inscribed "Penechates, son of Hatres" and it probably dates from the 1st to the 3rd century CE
- Mummified crocodiles, hawk and cats
- Material excavated by Sir Flinders Petrie who was a member of the Vancouver Museum Board in 1934

=== History of Vancouver ===
These include objects such as:

- Furnishings and memorabilia related to important individuals, civic events, functions and structures
- Edwardian household furnishings and accessories, including an excellent collection of locally made stained glass
- Street furniture, including signs, street lamps, mailboxes and building fragments from Vancouver
- Material related to Chinatown and the Chinese community, especially the Yip Family Collection from the Wing Sang Building
- Tools, equipment and furnishings related to Vancouver shops, businesses and industries
- Women’s clothing shoes and accessories worn and/or made in Vancouver, c. 1870–1980
- Toys, dolls and children’s clothing used in Vancouver, c. 1890–1980
- Objects used in the communication of sounds and images in Vancouver, c. 1890–1970
- Paintings by early Vancouver artists, 1900s–1930s
- Objects related to major events: Habitat 76, EXPO 86, 1990 Gay Games, 2010 Olympic Games
- Objects related to Rogers Sugar Refinery
- Uniforms, accessories, badges, ephemera, etc. related to public transit from BCER to Translink
- An extensive collection of neon signs

== Galleries ==
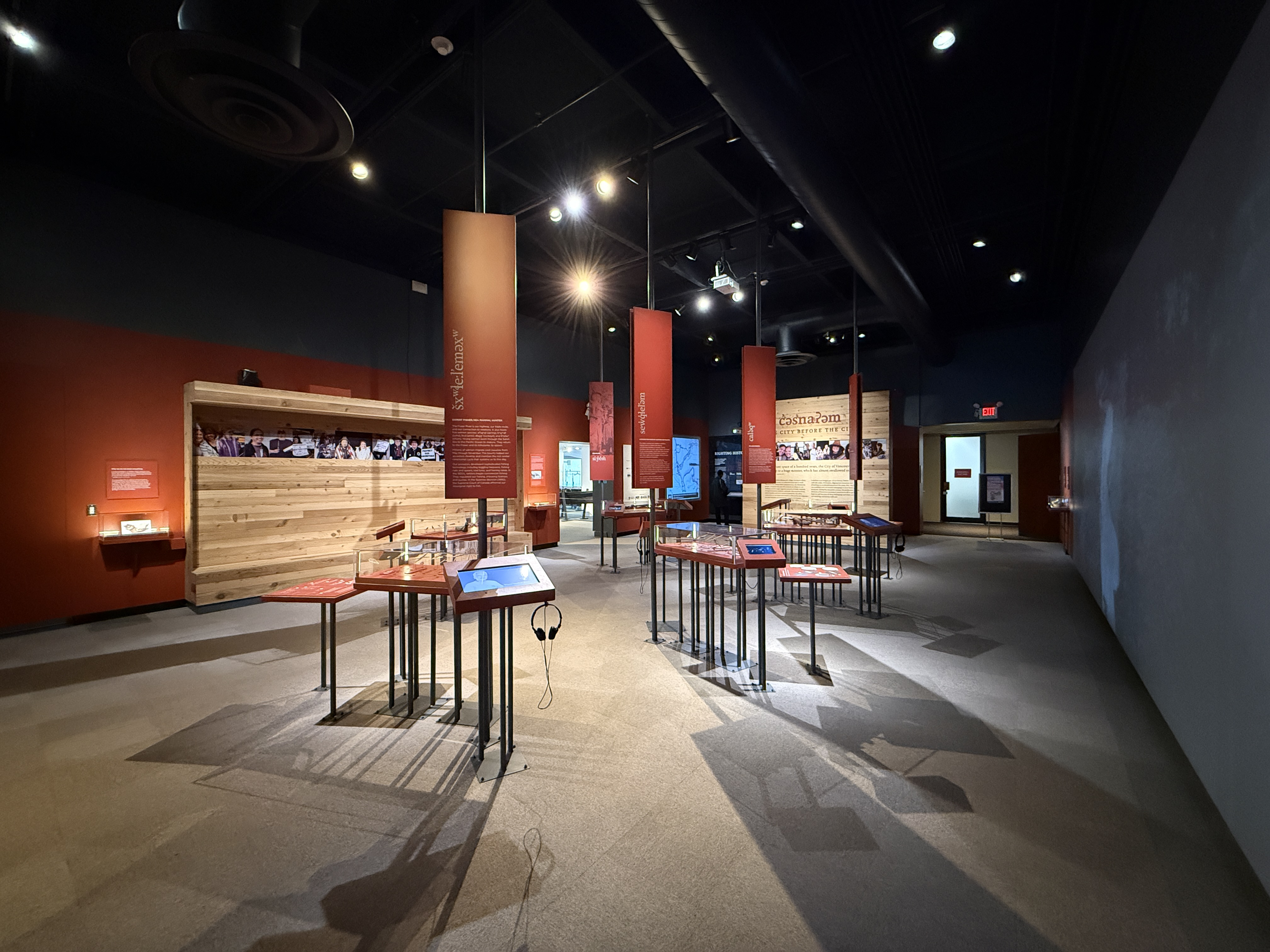
The c̓əsnaʔəm, the city before the city exhibition

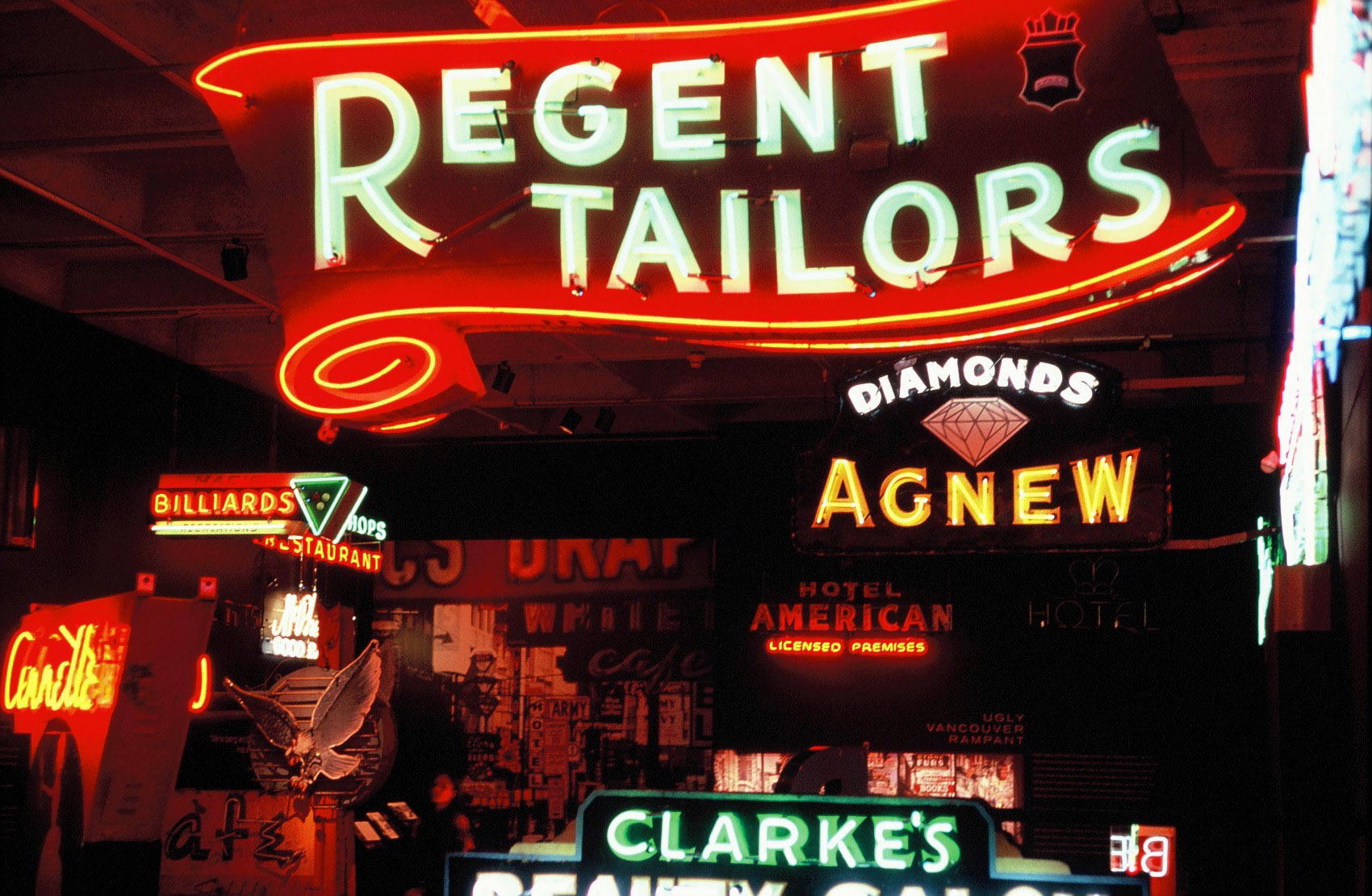
Neon Vancouver | Ugly Vancouver was a long-term restoration project that showcased former neon signs found in Vancouver from the 1950s to 1970s; it is ended in 2022.

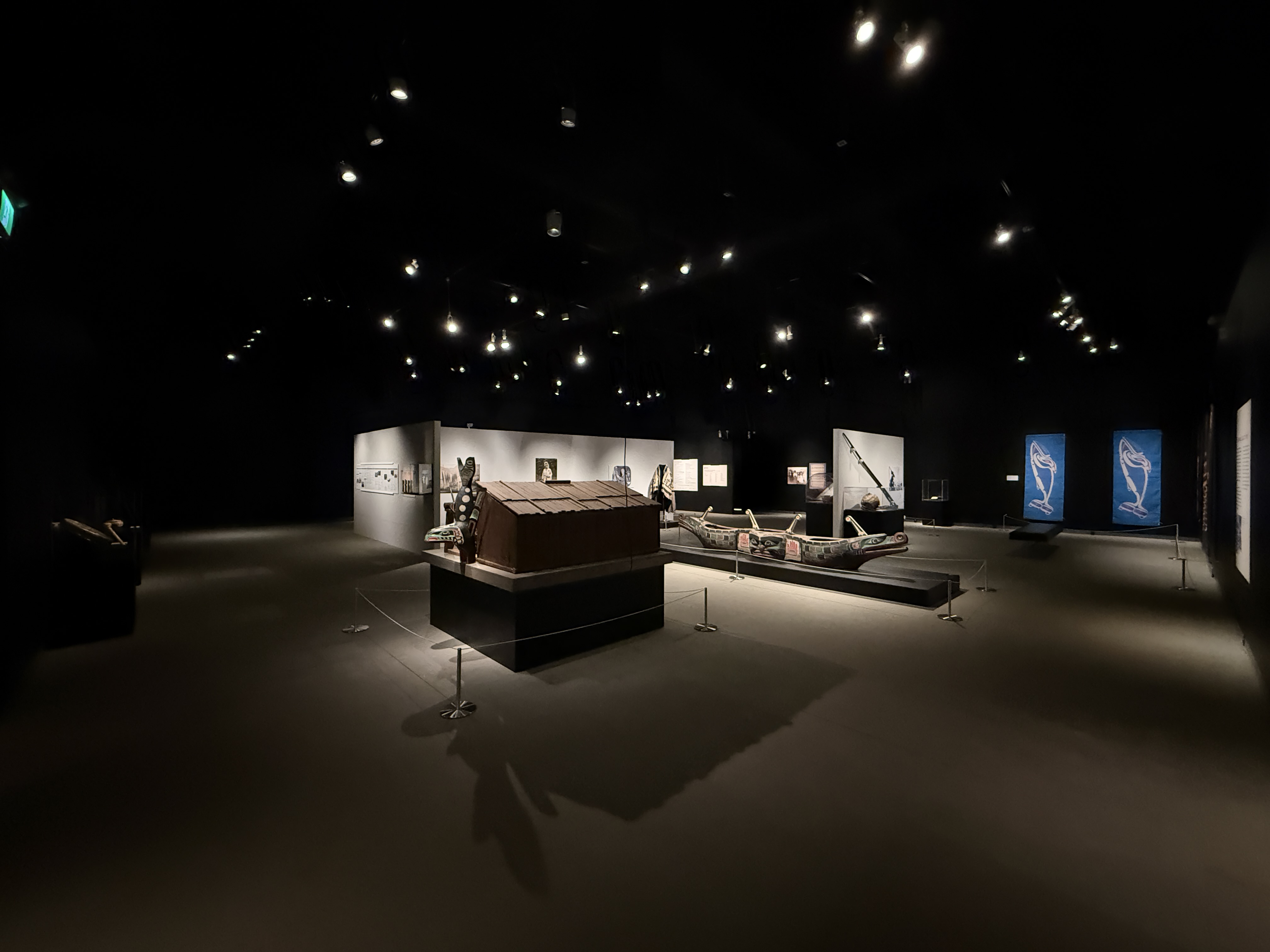
The Work of Repair: Redress & Repatriation at the Museum of Vancouver

The museum has a number of permanent galleries that cover the entire history of Vancouver in an experience which includes sound and film. In addition to the historical permanent galleries, permanent galleries at the Museum of Vancouver include:

- c̓əsnaʔəm The City Before the City
- "That Which Sustains Us"
- 1900s–1920s History Gallery: Gateway to the Pacific
- 1930s–1940s History Gallery: Boom, Bust, and War
- 1950s History Gallery: Vancouver in The Fifties
- 1960s–1970s History Gallery: You Say You Want A Revolution
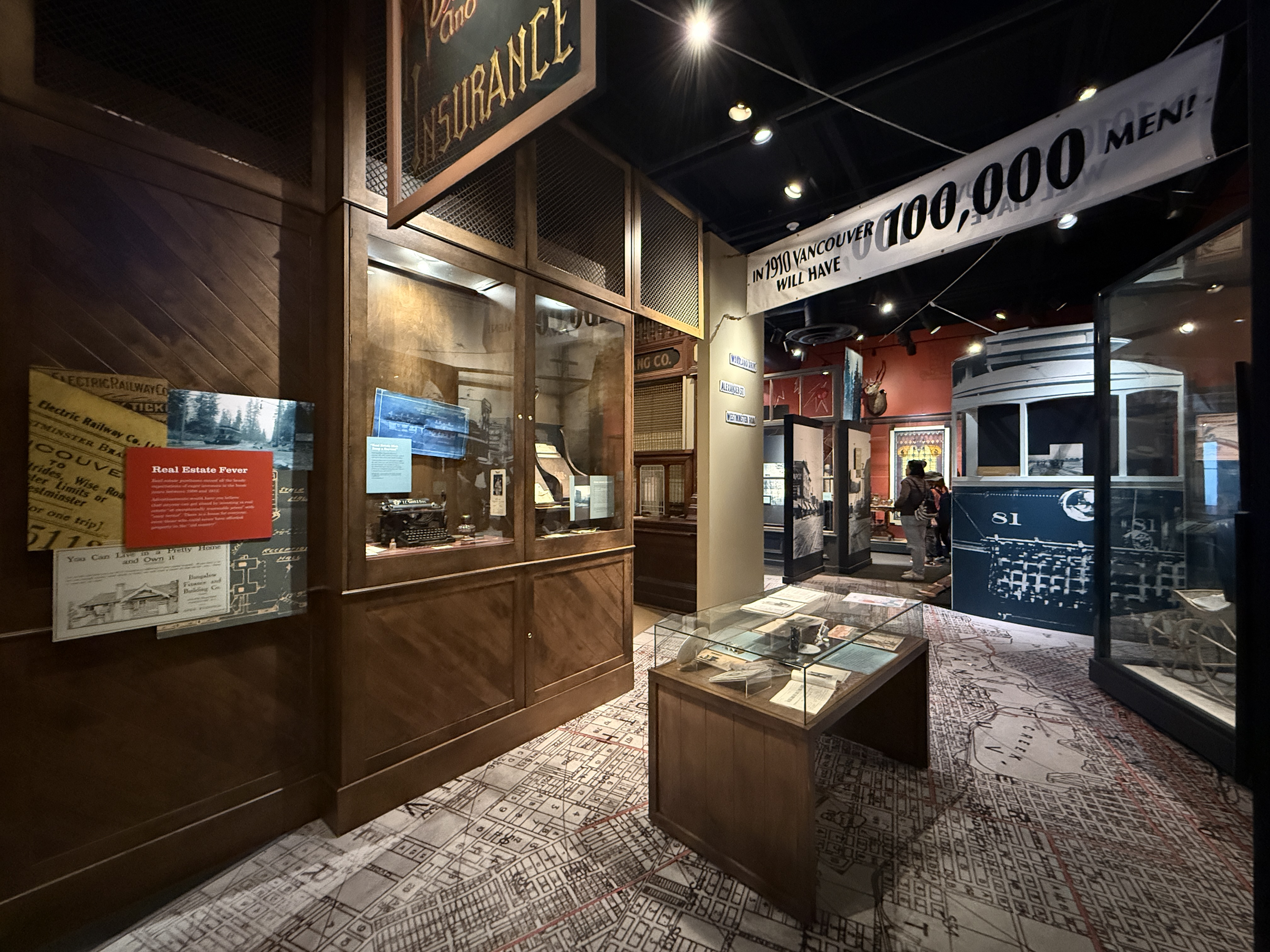
1900s–1920s History Gallery: Gateway to the Pacific

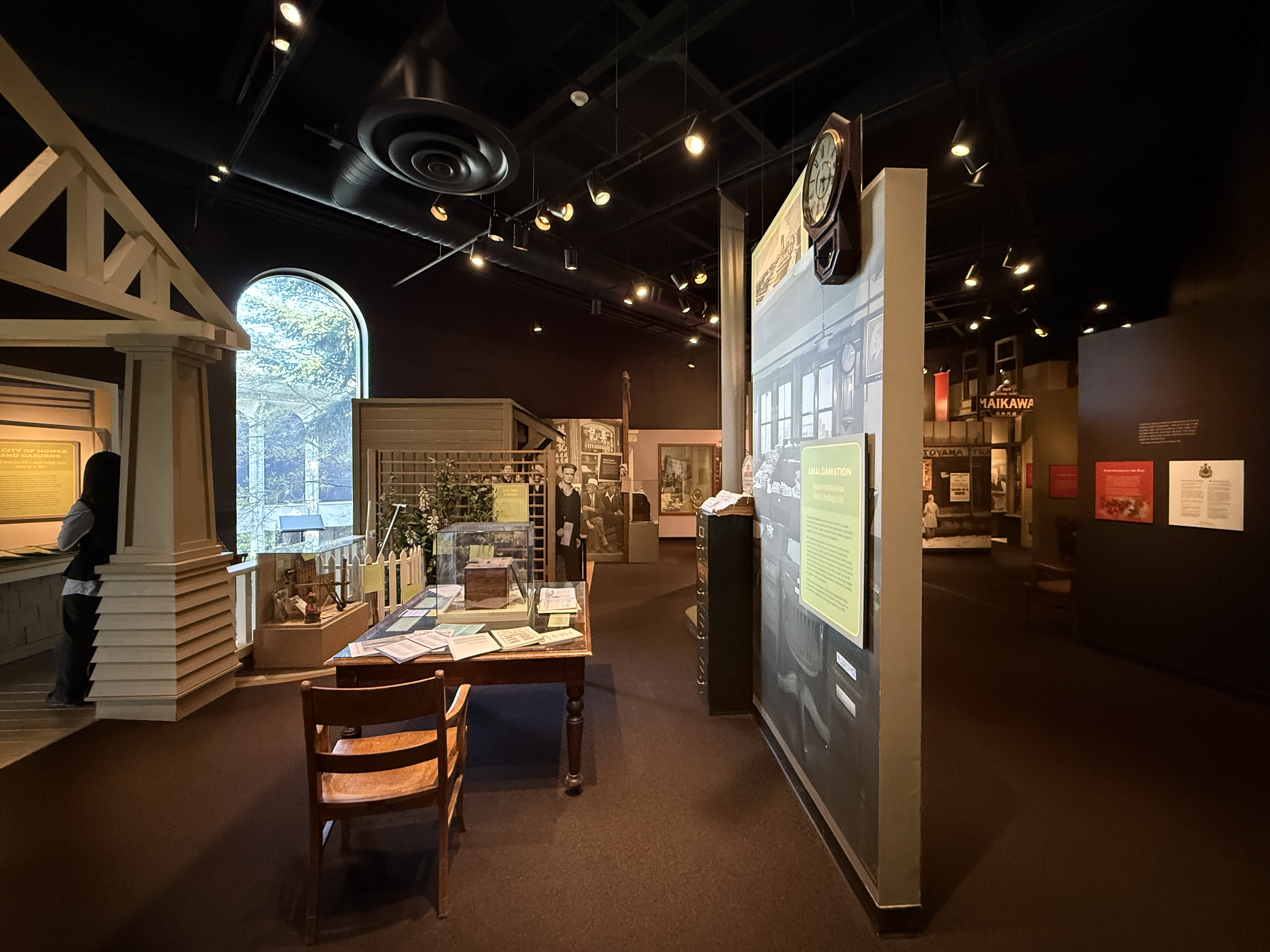
1930s–1940s History Gallery: Boom, Bust, and War

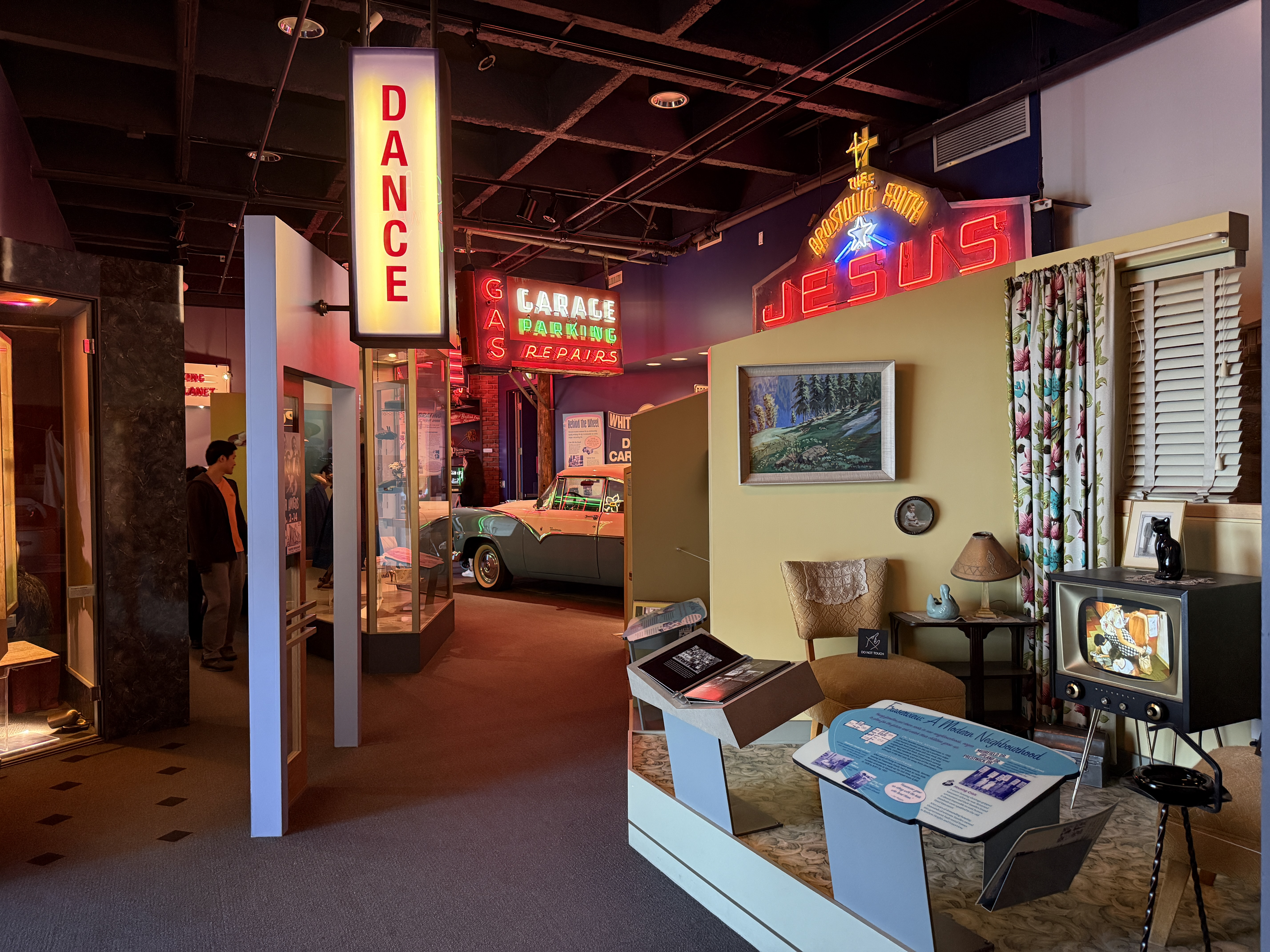
1950s History Gallery

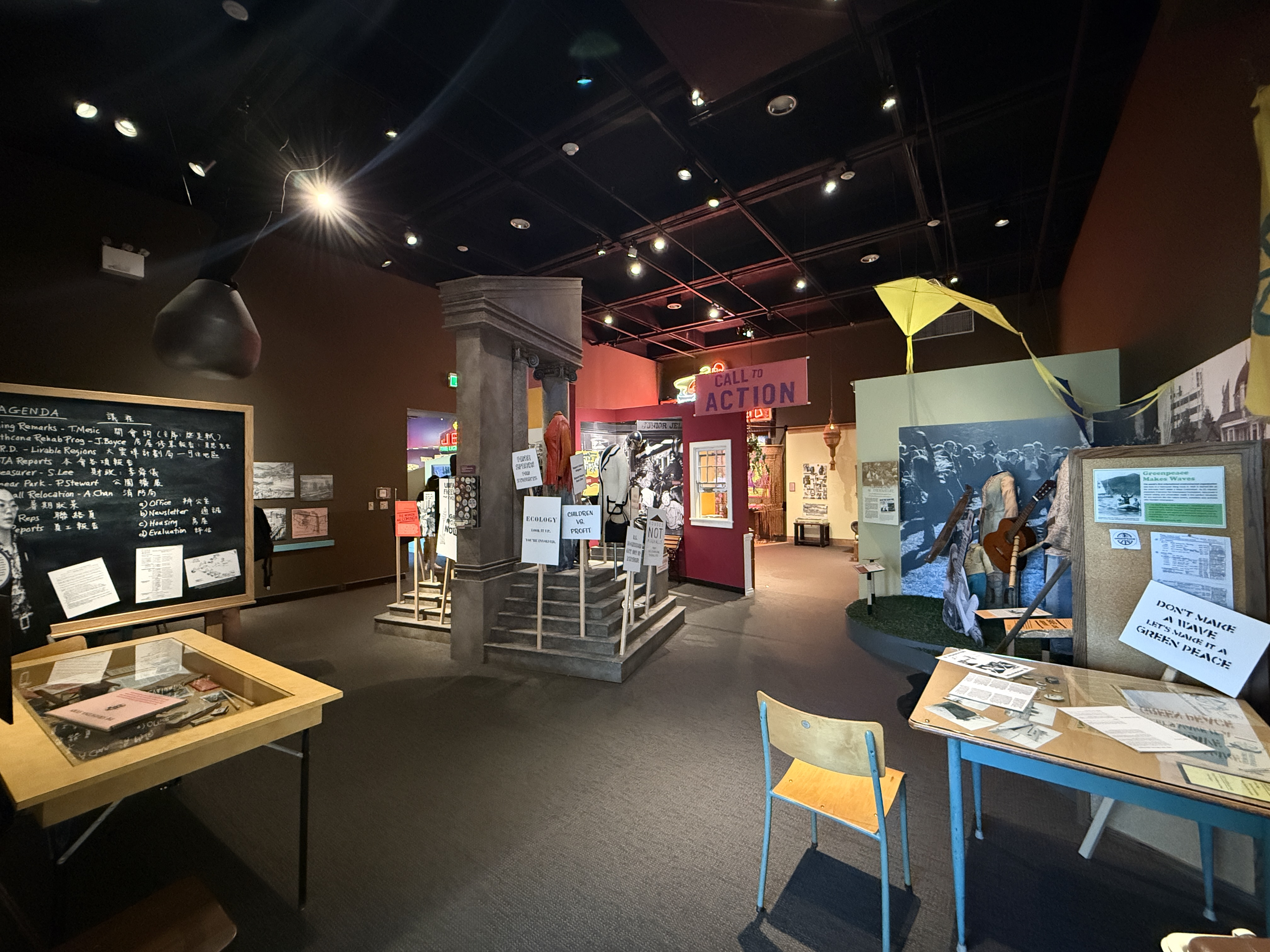
1960s–1970s History Gallery: You Say You Want A Revolution

While most of these galleries explore the history of Vancouver during its specified time period, the Neon Vancouver gallery features a collection of neon signs that were used in Vancouver from the 1950s to 1970s.

Along with its permanent galleries, the Museum of Vancouver typically hosts temporary exhibitions. Three temporary exhibitions are presently held at the museum. Exhibitions devoted to Indigenous cultures included c̓əsnaʔəm, the city before the city, developed in partnership with the Musqueam Indian Band (opened in 2015 and still on display) and HAIDA NOW: A Visual Feast of Innovation and Tradition (2018–2021).
