= Dynamic Mobile Steel Sculpture =

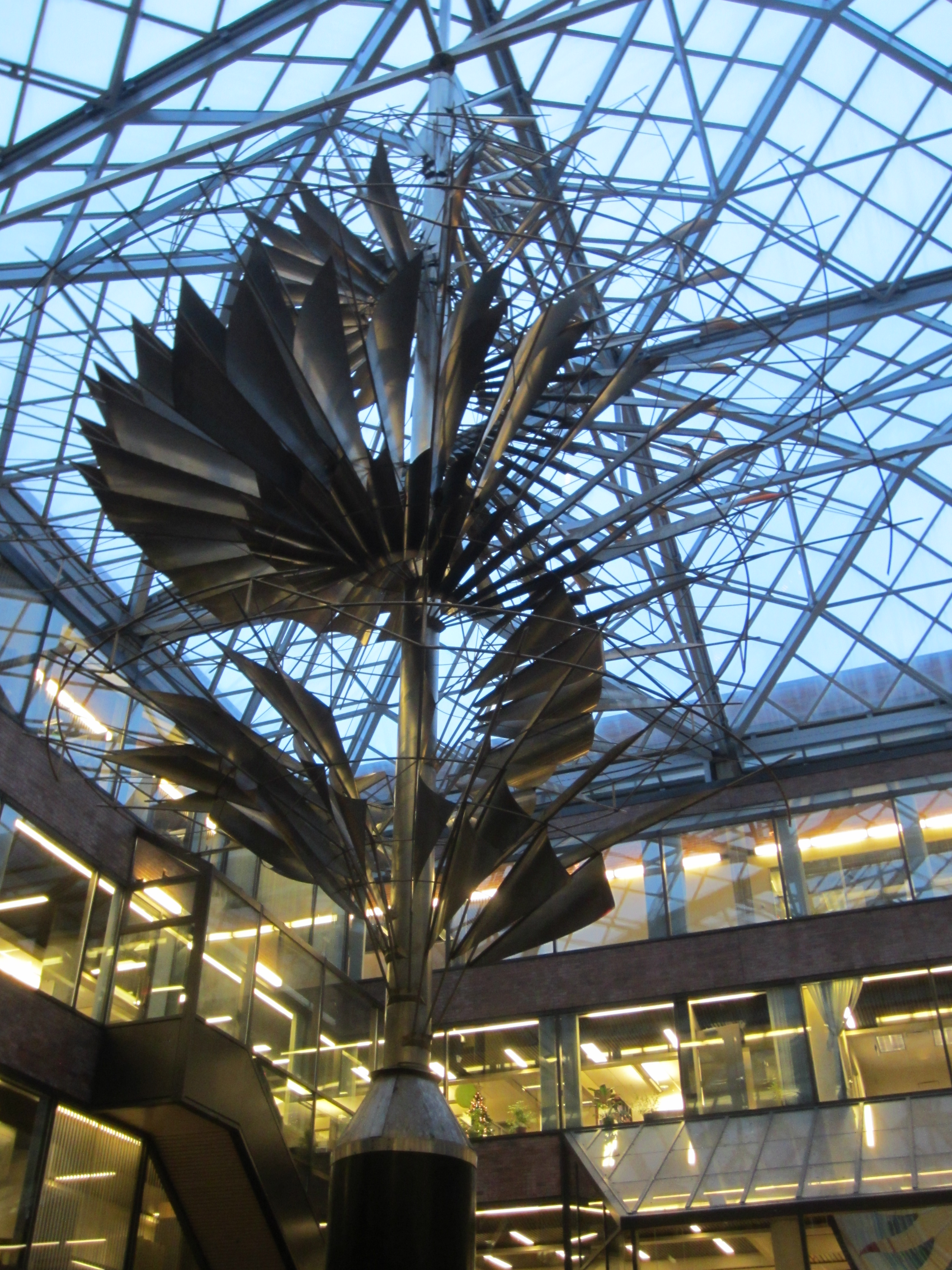
- The sculpture in 2012
- Artist: George A. Norris
- Medium: Steel sculpture
- Location: Victoria, British Columbia, Canada
- 48.42325°N 123.36423°W

Dynamic Mobile Steel Sculpture is an abstract sculpture by Canadian artist George A. Norris, hanging in the atrium of the Central Branch of Greater Victoria Public Library in Victoria, British Columbia, Canada.

The work is included in at least one published Frommer's walking tour of Victoria.
