= George Norris =

George Norris may refer to:

- George A. Norris (1928–2013), Canadian sculptor
- George W. Norris (1861–1944), American politician
  - SS George W. Norris, a Liberty ship
- George Norris, master of the Sprightly, who named Bouvet Island in 1825

== See also ==
- George W. Norris House, a National Historic Landmark in Nebraska
- George Norris Williams (1866–1949)
