= H. R. MacMillan Space Centre =

Astronomy museum in British Columbia, Canada

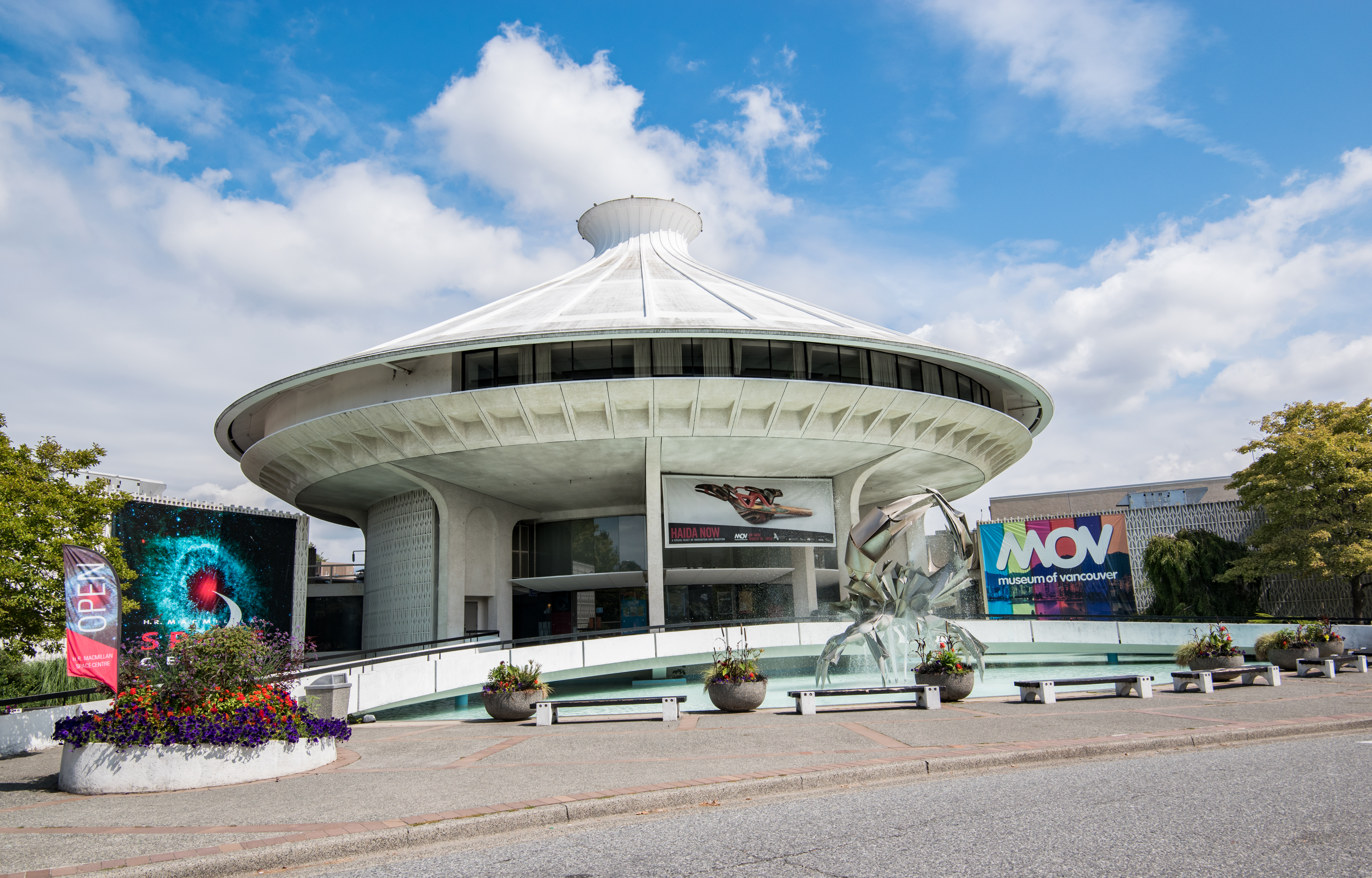
- Main entrance to the Space Centre, shared with the Museum of Vancouver
- Established: 1968
- Location: 1100 Chestnut Street; Vancouver, British Columbia, Canada
- Coordinates: 49.276205°N 123.1444°W
- Type: Planetarium
- Visitors: 126,420 (2018)
- Chairperson: Matthew Anthony
- Owner: H.R. MacMillan Space Centre Society
- Website: spacecentre.ca

The H.R. MacMillan Space Centre, is an astronomy museum located at Vanier Park in Vancouver, British Columbia. The museum was opened on October 28, 1968, containing a Planetarium Star Theatre. Today the museum includes an exhibit gallery and demonstration theatre where public lectures and events are hosted. The museum shares the building with the Museum of Vancouver. Next to the building is the Gordon MacMillan Southam Observatory.

== Name ==
The Space Centre is named after H. R. MacMillan, a local lumber magnate and philanthropist, who paid for the inclusion of the Planetarium Theatre into the design of the Centennial Museum Building. To this day, locals also refer to the Space Centre as the Planetarium.

== Design ==
The building was designed in the 1960s by architect Gerald Hamilton to house what was then called The Centennial Museum. The planetarium was added as part of a pre-construction re-design after a donation by H.R. Macmillan.

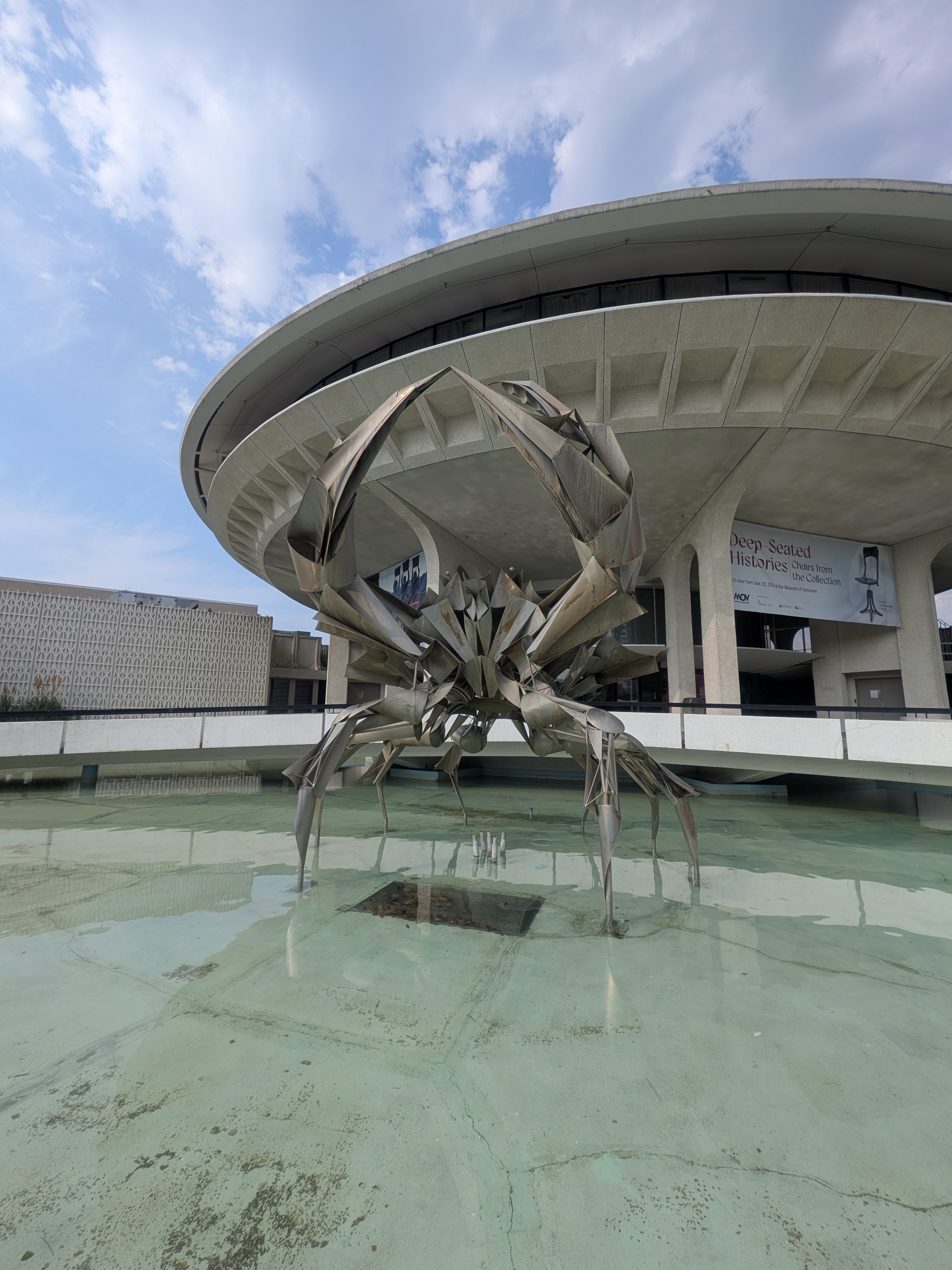
The Crab (August 2025)

Outside the museum is a sculpture by George Norris called The Crab. Norris's sculpture won a 1967 design competition. The Space Centre originated as the H.R. MacMillan Planetarium until its re-branding in the 1990s when it expanded to include exhibit space into one of the wings of the building it shares with the Museum of Vancouver. The facility was refurbished and renovated to include the Space Centre exhibit space in 1997-98 by Matsuzaki Wright Architects.
