= Gerald Hamilton (architect) =

Canadian architect

Gerald Hamilton (1923–1999) was a Canadian architect best known for his buildings in Vancouver, British Columbia.

Hamilton was born in Germany, but moved to the United Kingdom where he received training at Leeds University from 1940 to 1943. He joined the British Army from 1943 to 1947, before arriving in Vancouver in the 1950s.

His first New Formalist building in the city was the 1963 East Asiatic House. The building uses two office blocks connected by a pavilion. He also designed the H. R. MacMillan Space Centre in Vanier Park, with its conical dome, which opened in 1968.

He was made a Fellow of the Royal Architectural Institute of Canada in 1971.

== Works ==
- East Asiatic House (1963), 1201 West Pender Street
- Canadian Indemnity Building (1964), 1477 West Pender Street
- Frank Clair Stadium, now TD Place Stadium, and Ottawa Civic Centre, now TD Place Arena (1967), Ottawa
- H. R. MacMillan Space Centre (1968), Vanier Park
- St. George's Greek Orthodox Cathedral (1970), 4500 Arbutus Street
- Office building (1970), 1090 West Pender Street
