= Greater Victoria Public Library =

Public library system in British Columbia

Greater Victoria Public Library (GVPL)
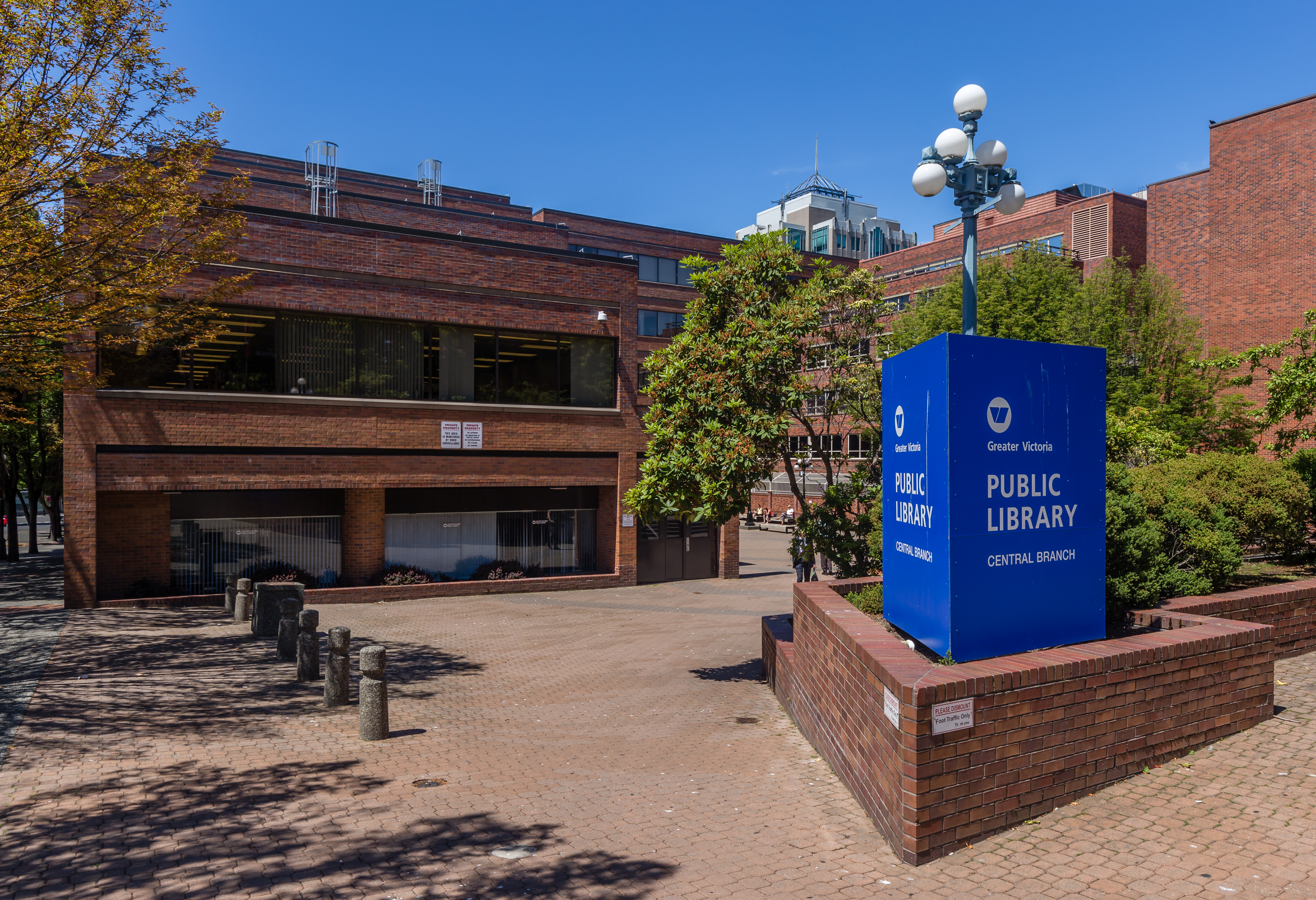
- Central Branch (2018)
- 48.423277°N 123.364400°W
- Location: 735 Broughton Street; Victoria, British Columbia; V8W 3H2
- Established: 1889
- Branches: 12

Collection
- Items collected: books, e-books, music, cds, periodicals, maps, genealogical archives, business directories, local history
- Size: 732,925 (2017)

Access and use
- Circulation: 4.6 M (2017)
- Population served: 320,000

Other information
- Website: Greater Victoria Public Library

The Greater Victoria Public Library (GVPL) is a public library that serves Victoria, British Columbia and the surrounding area.

== Services ==
In addition to services offered at each location, GVPL provides electronic resources (also known as bibliographic databases) to library cardholders through the library's web site. These "E-Resources" include the full text of Canadian newspapers, international magazines (currently licensed through EBSCO Industries), and standard reference works such as the World Book encyclopedia.

- Information and reference services
- Access to full text databases
- Community information
- Internet access
- Reader's advisory services
- Programs for children, youth and adults
- Interlibrary loan
- Free downloadable audiobooks

== Early history: 1858 to 1948 ==
=== Private libraries ===
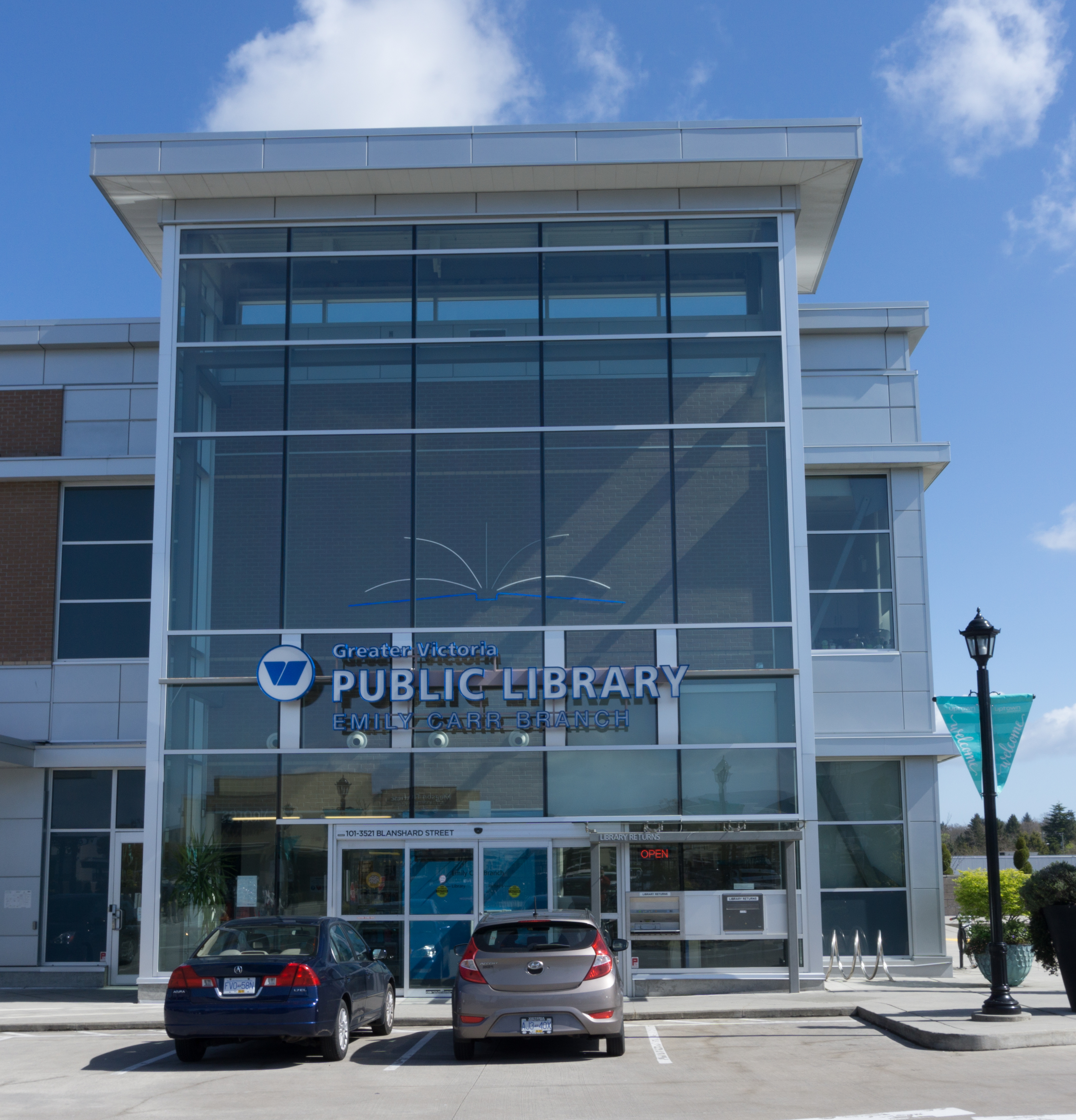
Emilly Carr Branch in Saanich

Prior to 1864, Victoria was served by at least two small, private lending libraries. In 1858, for instance, The Gazette described a library and reading room opened by a Mr W. F. Herre. This private library, located in the Hibben and Carswell Building on Yates Street near the corner of Wharf Street, was "fitted up in a very neat and comfortable style ...". It was, the writer conceded, "yet limited, but so soon as the books can be obtained from San Francisco, [it] will be greatly enlarged." The writer further explained that Mr Herre's library "filled a much needed want of the town".

In 1861, the Victoria Literary Institute was founded. The Victoria Literary Institute's objective as described in its constitution was "the formation of a Library, Reading Room, and Museum; the delivery of Lectures, and the diffusion of Literacy and Scientific knowledge among the people of Victoria." The Institute's shareholder's paid twenty-five dollars as well as a monthly fee of one dollar. Subscribers paid a five dollar entrance fee plus one dollar per month, or they could choose to pay for a lifetime membership at one hundred dollars. The Victoria Literary Institute however was only able to provide a series of evening lectures during the 1861–62 winter before being dissolved in the summer of 1862.

Another early library—that of the British Columbia division of the T. Eaton Company—was started in 1862 by department store manager David Spencer..

=== Mechanics' Institute ===
On December 16, 1864, the local Mechanics' Institute created Victoria's first community-oriented lending library. Located on Bastion Street, the library's collection included books donated by James Douglas (Governor). The Institute's rooms were "well lighted and warmed, and with their copious supply of reading matter, [formed] one of the pleasantest [sic] places in the city in which to pass a quiet hour."

In October, 1886, the Mechanics' Institute informed Victoria's city council that it intended to wind up its affairs and offered the book collection to the City. A referendum followed, and a majority of voters—fearing increased taxes—rejected the proposal as an unnecessary "frill."

The books, however, were purchased by Mayor James Fell (with personal funds) and kept in storage. A subsequent vote, held little more than a year later, resulted in the City's acceptance of the books and the beginning of Greater Victoria's first truly public library.

In 1889, the Mechanics' Institute collection of 4,150 volumes was presented to the City of Victoria as the nucleus of a new public library. An additional 389 works, valued at $500, were presented to the library by English publishers Cassells and Co.. The City, however, could not afford a purpose-built library; therefore, the collection was housed in rooms located in "Spencer's Arcade" (possibly provided by the YMCA) on Broad Street.

=== Victoria Public Library ===
Despite its difficult political and financial beginnings, the new Victoria Public Library that opened on May 10, 1889, fulfilled a clear and present need. According to a Colonist newspaper article, "Since the closing of the Mechanics' Institute, Victorians in the commoner walks of life have sorely missed the opportunities afforded of obtaining good and instructive reading [material]." The first book lent was The Life of Hon. George Brown. (Probably Alexander Mackenzie's The Life and Speeches of the Hon. George Brown published in Toronto in 1882.) It was borrowed by Victoria's Mayor John Grant.

The Victoria Public Library was located in the YMCA building on Broad Street for only two years. In 1892, possibly as a cost-saving measure, the City council ordered the Library moved to rooms in the City Hall.

In 1902 a bylaw was passed to limit library funding to $5,000 per year. In 1903, council deliberated over a permanent site for a library building. Two locations were chosen, with a price difference of $700. Council was against the higher priced property on the northwest corner of Yates and Blanshard Streets. But Stephen Jones, advocate of this site, broke the impasse by offering to pay the additional costs.

In 1903, a by-law created a board of three commissioners (one being a member of council) to administer the library. The first commissioners—Rev. Canon Beanlands, E. O. S. Scholefield (of the Provincial Library), and Alderman Thornton Fell (Chairman)—first met on May 15, 1905. Meanwhile, construction of the new Carnegie library had begun in 1904. The neo-Classical stone building, constructed for $53,000, was financed by Andrew Carnegie. It was completed in 1905, but the library's collection remained in its makeshift quarters at City Hall until January 2, 1906, when it moved to the new building.

=== Early disputes ===
The Library's early years in the new building were characterized by disputes between the Library Commissioners and the city council. The Library's books and other materials provoked controversy, and candidates for public office made "political capital" of the fact that works such as The Decameron were available to borrow. Although the Library Commissioners refused to remove the criticized works, they were moved to a shelf in the librarian's office. On the other hand, the Commissioners refused to allow religious newspapers (such as The Christian Science Monitor) on the shelves. (This policy was reversed around 1914.)

Weeks after taking over the new quarters, the matter of Sunday openings was before the Library Commissioners. In 1918, the Board maintained the policy of Sunday openings, despite the presence of city detectives, who (according to Pagett, 1934) would "visit the library, parade around on Sunday and subject the librarian in charge to heavy quizzing as to infringement of Sunday observance statutes."

=== Early automation ===
When this library building opened in 1906, books were kept in "closed stacks" that did not allow public access. Instead, a user would request an item, and the librarian or page (clerk) would retrieve it. However, to let patrons know whether a book was in or out, the new library was equipped with a recently developed "indicator system". But this English system, which involved red and blue signals (see Pagett, 1934), required a staff of several librarians to keep it up-to-date. Therefore, in 1911, Victoria Public Library borrowers were allowed access to the stacks for the first time.

=== Victoria Library School ===
Under the leadership of chief librarian Helen Stewart, a library school was inaugurated as part of the Victoria Library. One student, Margaret J. Clay, succeeded Stewart in 1924. Other graduates who went on to prominent positions included Margaret Crompton (later Mrs Thurston Taylor), who became reference librarian at the Enoch Pratt Free Library; Phyllis Knowles (later Mrs Byron Blood), who was cataloguing librarian at the Webb Institute of Naval Architecture; and Elsie Taylor, who became assistant cataloguer at the American Library in Paris.

=== Early gaming at the library ===
When the library opened in the Carnegie building, only the first floor was used. But by 1910, that floor had become too small to serve the needs of Victoria's growing community. The reading room was therefore moved to the second floor. At about this time a "Chess and Draughts Room" (for chess and checkers) was also opened on the second floor. Noise from the "gamesters," however, disrupted reading room users and the games were moved to an upstairs room in 1913, where they remained there for another ten years. Rooms in this upper floor were also used (prior to 1912) by the Natural History Society and the Victoria Musical Society.

=== Children's department ===
Although the idea of a children's department had been considered in 1910, that year's costs to re-arrange existing departments (and create the games room) left no funds to begin children's services. But the Library's commissioners explained the benefits of a "children's room" to City Council, hopeful the next year would bring the necessary funds:

In the first place the room is designed that the child may be introduced, under careful supervision, to that wonderful fairyland which is the bookworld, so that the little seeker after pleasure or knowledge may be started on the right path. If a child's reading is left to haphazard choice, it is not unlikely that his or her taste may become more or less perverted, simply because there has been no one to advise or to guide; in any event it is more than probably that in such cases a taste for the cheap and ephemeral will be acquired at the expense of an appreciation of what is best and purest in literature. It is the aim of the children's librarian to bring together the children and the right books under the most favorable conditions.

The first children's department opened in 1913. The first children's librarian was Mrs Lillian B. Steinberger. She was succeeded in 1914 by Mary Hughes, a graduate of the Carnegie Library Training School of Pittsburgh.

=== Service beyond the city of Victoria ===
The Library's core funding came from the City of Victoria, but residents of Oak Bay, Esquimalt and Saanich were able to use the library without restrictions. In 1912, however, the Library Commissioners asked each of these municipalities for an annual fee of $100, which would be applied to new book purchases. Fifteen months later, and no money having been received, the Commissioners requested $250. By January 1914, when Commissioners requested $500 from each municipality, Oak Bay contributed this amount. However, instead of applying the amount to new book purchases (as contracted with Oak Bay), the City of Victoria intended to use it to reduce the City's tax levy. Since this was not the purpose for which the Commissioners contracted with Oak Bay, the cheque was returned.

Attempts by Library commissioners to obtain contributions from surrounding municipalities continued until at least 1919. And well into the 1950s (and possibly not until the operating agreement of 1966) representatives of the other municipalities served by the Victoria Public Library had no representation (or else voice, but no vote) on the board of the Victoria Public Library.

In 1924, Margaret Clay became chief librarian. Her term of office, which lasted until 1952, was a time of much change for the library. One former GVPL librarian characterized this period as "a series of struggles that forged the old 'free library' into a 20th century public library" (Teece; 1989).

== Growth and troubles: 1949–1960 ==
=== New building addition ===
November 1949: Plans approved for a four-storey addition to the original Carnegie Library. The successful bidder was Luney Bros. & Hamilton ($224,500). This would replace the original building—designed to hold 15,000 volumes. By 1947, it held 76,000.

December 1949: Referendum to approve $350,000 for new construction, furnishings, and renovations to the existing Carnegie Library building.

Library operated in temporary quarters at the Pantorium building, corner of Fort and Quadra Streets.

Monday October 15, 1951: New addition officially opened. Departments gradually moved back.

=== Bookmobile service ===
October 1952: Library Board decision to acquire a Bookmobile..

April 5, 1954: Bookmobile service begins, although the decision to provide bookmobile service had been made in 1952. A newspaper editorial of the time expressed some dismay that such a service was even necessary:

By taking the books to the people, rather than requiring the people to come to the books, the board feels it will help to encourage good reading. Perhaps it is unfortunate that such a service should be considered necessary. It is nevertheless a symbol of the age and one which must be faced if the library is to extend its usefulness beyond the ranks of those who make use of the centrally located downtown building.

The bookmobile route included Mount Newton Crossroad, Saanichton Agricultural grounds, Elk Lake and the eastern part of Central Saanich, Brentwood, and Wilkinson Road. However, the launch of the new service was overshadowed by the circumstances surrounding the dismissal of John Marshall, first director of bookmobile services.

== The Marshall case: 1954 ==
On January 25, 1954, John M. Marshall, the recently hired director of bookmobile services, received notice of his termination, effective the following week. Outgoing Library Board Chairman J. F. K. English said no reason was required because Marshall's probationary period had not yet expired.

Newspaper reports cited unnamed sources who alleged various reasons for Marshall's termination—all involving either membership in or association with "Red-tinged organizations". According to one article, "A source in a position to have full details of the case informed the Times ... Mr. Marshall's dismissal resulted because his record showed at one time he was associated with the Westerner, a leftist newspaper published in Winnipeg, and that he attended Canadian Peace Congress meetings in Toronto in 1949, 1950 and 1951" (Book-Burning).

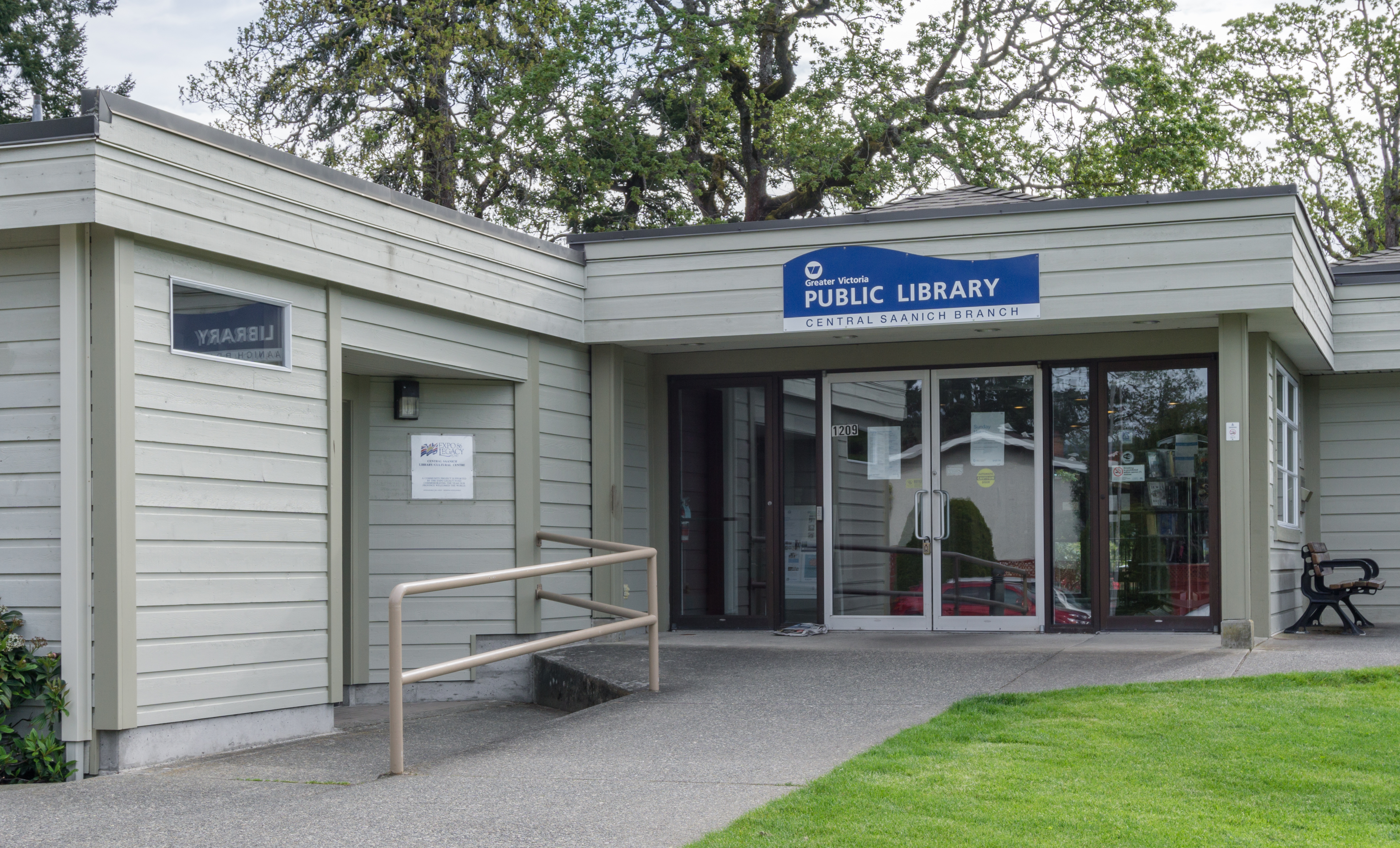
Central Saanich Branch in Brentwood Bay

At the same time as the Marshall case was unfolding, allegations surfaced of book censorship at the Victoria Public Library. Elgin Neish, an official of the Fisherman's Union, alleged that Victoria City Alderman Brent Murdoch was behind a "book-burning proposal" at Victoria Public Library. According to one newspaper report, "A suggestion [had] been made that pro-Communist books be 'cleaned up' in the library" (Book Burning).

At the first meeting of the new Library Board, on February 3, 1954, Chief Librarian Thressa Pollock resigned. As she reportedly explained, "a certain circumstance"—unconnected with either the Marshall case or the book censorship issue—"confirmed my recent suspicion that it would be utterly impossible for me to continue to carry on my work as chief librarian of the Victoria Public Library should certain members of the 1954 Library Board continue to hold office on the board." Board members for 1954 were James E. Neely (chair), Doris Lougheed, Ald. Brent Murdoch, Prof. Robert Wallace, and Lieut.-Col. Walter Mosedale (later disqualified because he did not live within Victoria's city limits).

Other resignations followed. These included Nora Dryburgh (appointed bookmobile director in a temporary capacity after Marshall's dismissal) and Mrs. Ross Napier (head of the cataloguing department for 19 years).

Library Board member Professor Robert Wallace publicly protested Marshall's dismissal and called on the board to allow Marshall not only to speak in his own defence, but also to reverse its decision to dismiss him. Support for Wallace's position came from the Victoria College Faculty and Staff Association, the Greater Victoria Teachers' Association, and the Saanich Teachers' Association."

While the controversy simmered, the Library Board appointed John C. Lort acting chief librarian, effective May 1, 1954.

== 1960s–present ==
Between July and October, 1962 a survey of the services offered by Victoria Public Library carried out by Rose Vainstein, assistant professor of the School of Librarianship at UBC. This survey was in response to complaints from PTAs and citizen groups and a desire for improved library service on the part of Saanich, Oak Bay, and Esquimalt.

In 1966 the Greater Victoria Public Library was incorporated to serve the four core municipalities of Victoria, Saanich, Oak Bay and Esquimalt. At this time, control of the library passed from the City of Victoria to a board made up of representatives from these four "core" cities/municipalities.

1966: Town & Country Branch opens in rented space in the Town & Country Plaza, Saanich.

1969: Esquimalt Branch opens in rented space in Esquimalt Plaza.

1971: Oak Bay Branch opens.

1972: Saanich-Victoria Branch opens, replacing Town & Country Branch.

1976: Nellie McClung Branch opens in Saanich. It is named after Canadian feminist, politician, author and social activist Nellie McClung.

1980: Central Branch moves to its present location at Broughton and Blanshard from the Carnegie Library building.

1985: April 16, Esquimalt Branch opens its own new building.

1985: Automated library service begins.

1989: December 3, a fire destroys the Nellie McClung branch and all its books. A temporary library opened a block away on Garnet Road with a smaller collection of books that were checked out at the time of the fire. The building was rebuilt, reopening in August 1991.

1996: Service extended to Colwood, Langford, Highlands District and Metchosin.

1997: December, the Juan de Fuca Branch in Colwood opens.

1999: Saanich-Victoria Branch renamed after the famous author and artist Emily Carr.

2002: Service extended to Central Saanich and View Royal.

2003: May 15, Esquimalt Branch moves into a new building at the back of the Esquimalt Municipal Hall.

2007: October 11, Saanich Centennial Branch opens in the Pearkes Arena Complex, Saanich.

2008: February 17, CUPE 410 library workers are locked out indefinitely by the Greater Victoria Library Board following extended rotating job action and the breakdown of negotiations. In early April library workers return to work after successful negotiations.

2008: October, Goudy Express Branch opens in Langford.

2010: March 19, CEO Barry Holmes resigns after serious concerns regarding inappropriate spending surface.

2014: January 6, Emily Carr Branch relocates to the upper level of the Uptown shopping complex.

2018: May 26, sxʷeŋxʷəŋ təŋəxʷ James Bay Branch opens. Pronounced s-hweng hw-ung tongue-oo-hw, sxʷeŋxʷəŋ təŋəxʷ is the Lekwungen name for James Bay, a name selected by the City of Victoria through their “Name That Library” campaign and in consultation with the Songhees and Esquimalt Nations.

The Greater Victoria Public Library system now comprises twelve branch libraries: Central Branch, Bruce Hutchison Branch, Central Saanich Branch, Emily Carr Branch, Esquimalt Branch, Juan de Fuca Branch, Langford Heritage Branch, Nellie McClung Branch, Oak Bay Branch, Saanich Centennial Branch, Goudy Express Branch, and sxʷeŋxʷəŋ təŋəxʷ James Bay Branch. Together, these libraries serve a population of over 300,000 residents in the ten municipalities named above.

== Chief Librarians/CEOs ==
- James McGregor, LL.D., 1889–1897
- Henry Goward, M.A., 1897–1905
- Dr J. G. Ha[nds?], M.D., 1905
- No library service; collection moved from City Hall to Carnegie Library, August 19, 1905 – January 2, 1906
- Dr Hands, 1907–1912
- Helen Gordon Stewart, 1912 – September 1924
- Margaret J. Clay, 1924–1952
- Thressa A. Pollock (later Mrs. F. R. Shenstone), October 1952 – February 1954 (resigned)
- John C. Lort, May 1954 – October 1970 (resigned)
- Donald (Don) Miller, March 1971 – July 1983 (died)
- [interim director]
- Madeleine Aalto, December 3, 1984 – March 30, 1988 (resigned)
- Lee Teal, May 2, 1988 – 1995
- Sandra Anderson, 1995–2006 (retired)
- Barry Holmes, September 5, 2006 – March 19, 2010 (resigned)
- Lee Teal, 2010 (interim CEO)
- Maureen Sawa, 2010 – September 25, 2026 (retired)
- Stephanie Hall, September 25, 2026 - present.

== Legacy ==
On 29 February 1996, Canada Post issued 'Public Library, Victoria' designed by Raymond Bellemare and Robert G. Hill. The stamp features an image of the Carnegie Building at the corner of Yates and Blanshard Streets in Victoria, British Columbia. The Carnegie Building was designed in Richardsonian Romanesque style in 1904 by architects Thomas Hooper and C. Elwood Watkins with a grant from steel magnate Andrew Carnegie. The 5$ stamps are perforated 13.5 and were printed by British American Bank Note Company & Canadian Bank Note Company, Limited.
