= George A. Norris =

Canadian artist and sculptor

George Norris

George Alexander Norris (24 December 1928 – 12 March 2013) was a Canadian artist and sculptor. Norris is best known for his many public sculptures in Vancouver, British Columbia.

== Biography ==
George Norris was born in Victoria, British Columbia on Christmas Eve 1928 to George and Christina Norris. He studied at the Vancouver School of Art, and later under the tutelage of Ivan Meštrović at Syracuse University. In 1955 he won a British Council scholarship to study at the Slade School of Fine Art in London. Following this period he returned to Vancouver where he began his professional career.

Norris's best-known works are The Crab (1967), located outside the H. R. MacMillan Space Centre in Vancouver, and the panels on the University of Victoria's McPherson Library (1963).

In 1960 Norris married Phyllis Piddington, who had grown up at "Wychbury" on Esquimalt, an estate home designed by Samuel Maclure. They had three children: Anna, Samuel, and Alexander. In 1993 the couple moved to Shawnigan Lake. After Norris suffered a head injury in a hiking accident, the couple moved to Victoria in 2008. Norris died on 12 March 2013 at age 84.

== Works ==
Year	Name	Location	Address	Photograph
1955	Mother and Child	Library, University of British Columbia		
1963	(wall panels)	McPherson Library, University of Victoria		
1967	(concrete freise)	Postal Station D	2405 Pine Street, Vancouver, BC	
1967	Man about to Plant Alfalfa	H. R. MacMillan Building, University of British Columbia		
1967	The Swimmer	Vancouver Aquatic Centre	1050 Beach Ave, Vancouver, BC	
1968	Untitled	Frank A. Forward Building, University of British Columbia		
1968	The Crab	Museum of Vancouver / H. R. MacMillan Space Centre	1100 Chestnut St, Vancouver, BC	
1971	Capilano Heights Fountain			
1972		Georgia Viaduct Park		
1974		Pacific Centre Plaza	701 W Georgia St, Vancouver, BC	
1975	"The Prairie Chicken"	Swann Mall, University of Calgary		
1979	Dynamic Mobile Steel Sculpture	Victoria Public Library	735 Broughton St, Victoria, BC	
1990	(front door lintel)	Shawnigan Lake Community Centre	2804 Shawnigan Lake Rd, Shawnigan Lake, BC	
