= Vanier Park =

Park in Vancouver, British Columbia, Canada

Coordinates: 49°16′40″N 123°08′36″W

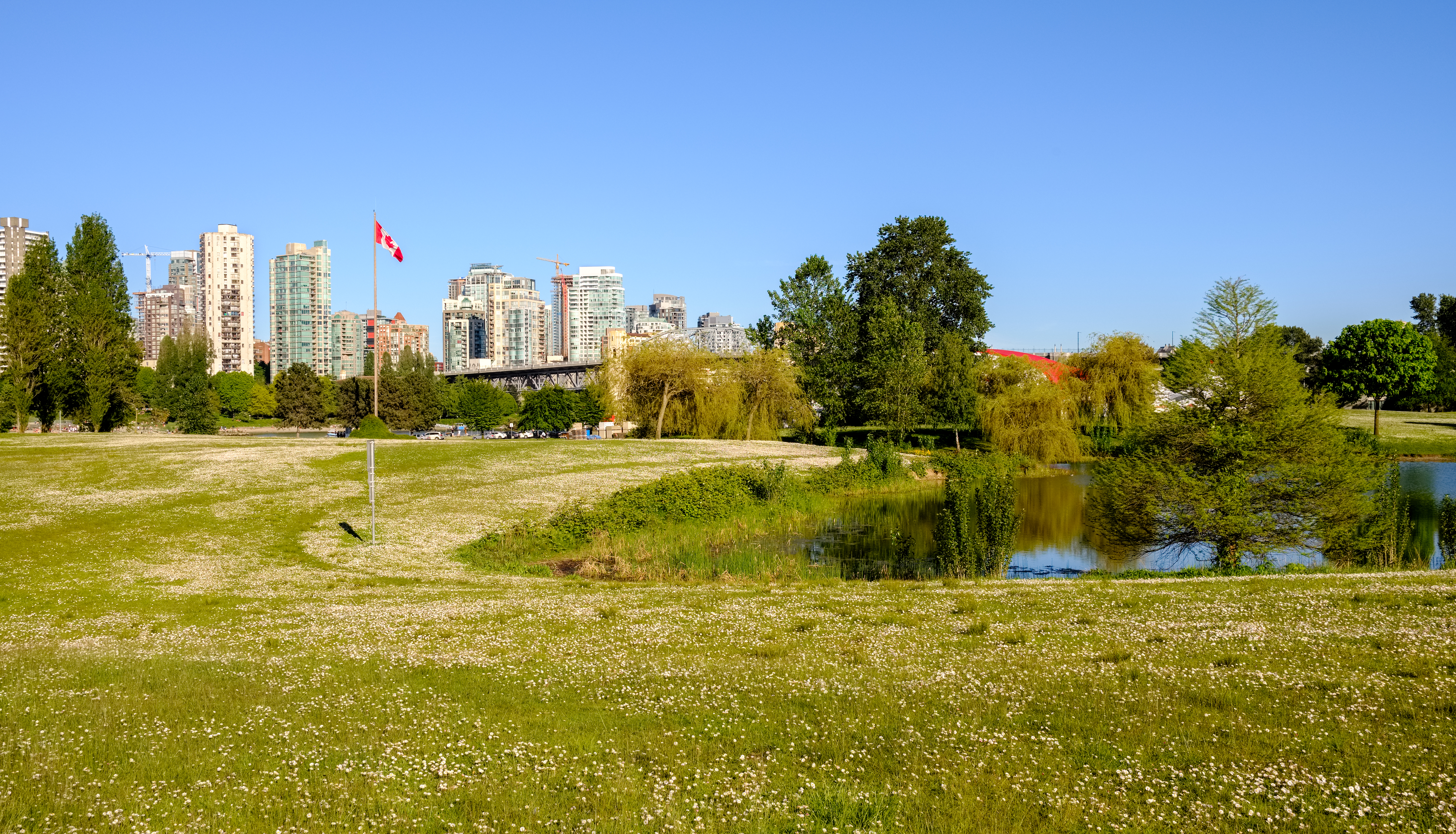
- Vanier Park in 2017
- Interactive map of Vanier Park
- Type: Public Park
- Location: Vancouver, British Columbia
- Created: 1967
- Operator: City of Vancouver
- Website: covapp.vancouver.ca/parkfinder/parkdetail.aspx?inparkid=120

Vanier Park is a municipal park located in the Kitsilano neighbourhood of Vancouver, British Columbia, Canada, created in 1967. It is home to the Museum of Vancouver, the Vancouver Maritime Museum, the City of Vancouver Archives, and the H. R. MacMillan Space Centre. It is also the site of the ancestral Squamish settlement of Sen̓áḵw.

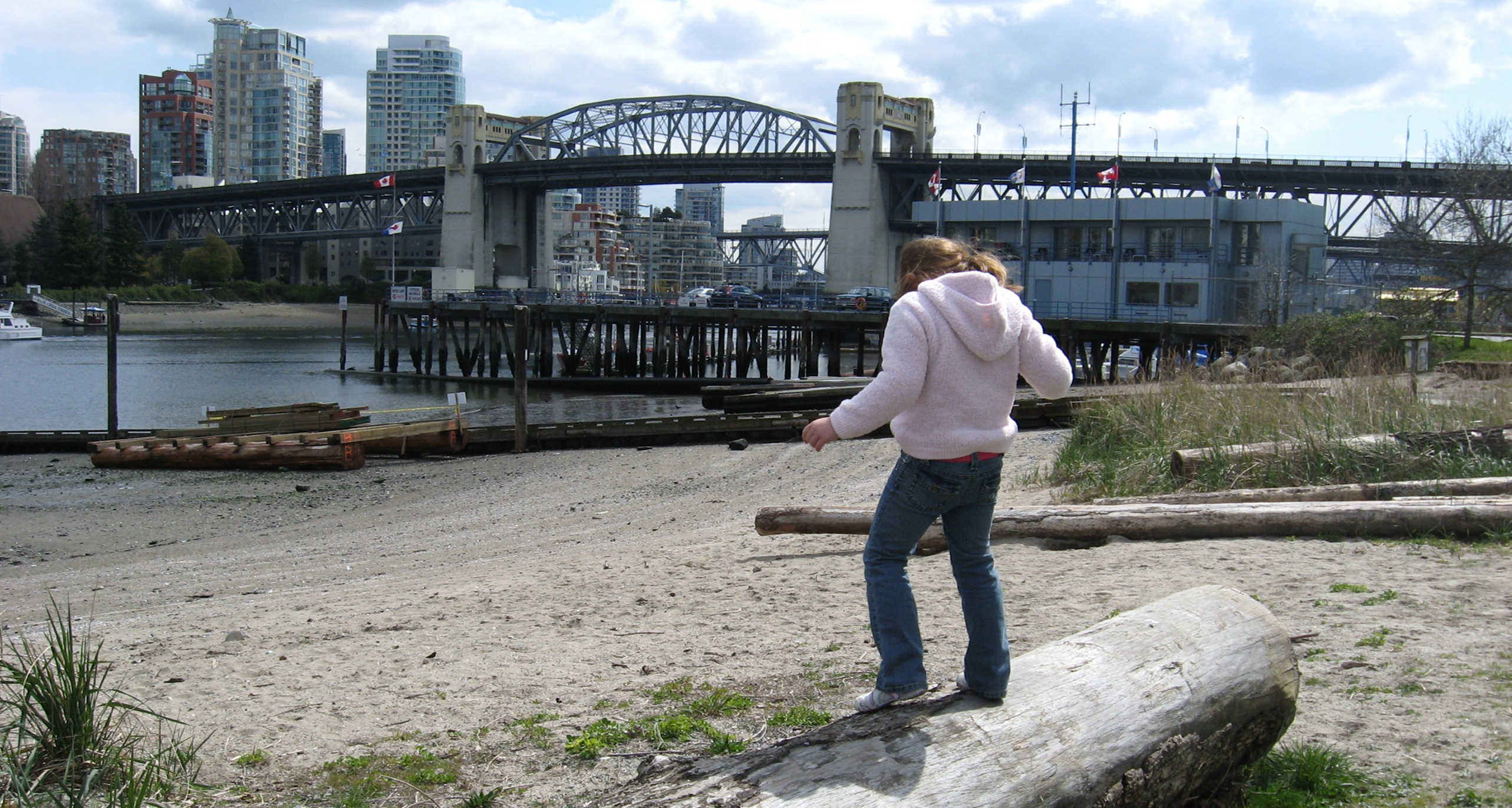
View of Burrard Bridge from Vanier Park.

== History ==
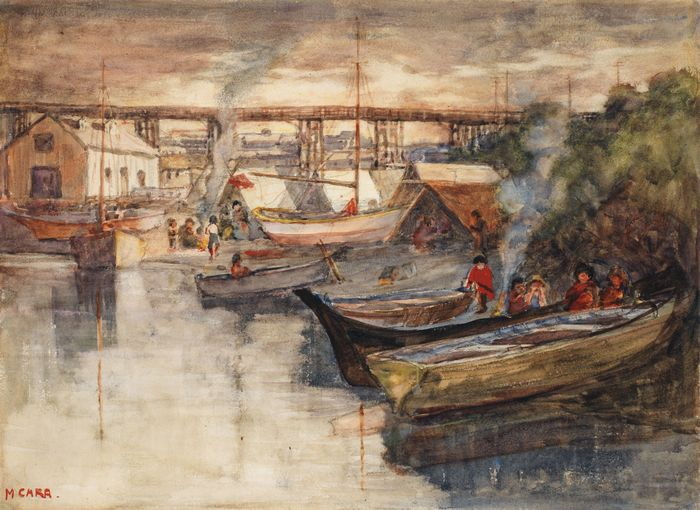
"Indian Encampment" by Emily Carr, c. 1908, depicting Sen̓áḵw

The Squamish had an ancestral fishing ground on the site. In the mid-1800s, they established a more permanent village site there named Sen̓áḵw. During the Royal Engineer’s Survey of 1869, it was designated as "Indian Reserve No. 6". Sen̓áḵw encompassed 80 acres, and included Vanier Park. In 1877, chief August Jack Khatsahlano, after whom the Kitsilano neighbourhood was named, was born at Sen̓áḵw.

The Canadian Pacific Railway, the Province and the City of Vancouver worked together to displace the Squamish inhabitants, with the City calling the settlement "a source of menace to the morals and health of the City". In 1913, the BC Government under Richard McBride expropriated the site, paying the inhabitants a fraction of the land's value, and giving them two days to leave before burning their homes to the ground.

The transaction was soon cancelled by the Dominion Government as contravening the Indian Act on several grounds, that only it had the right to negotiate surrenders of land with Indians interested, and that the Reserve belonged in common to the entire Squamish Band. The land subsequently was expropriated by the Vancouver Harbour Commission, an agent of the Dominion government, in 1916. The Squamish were never allowed to reoccupy of the reserve and most of it remained undeveloped. Around the time of the Second World War, the site was home to Royal Canadian Air Force (RCAF) station, Number 2 Equipment Depot. On October 28, 1966, it was turned over to the Vancouver Park Board by the Federal Government. Named for former Governor General of Canada Georges Vanier, the park officially opened on May 30, 1967. The H.R. MacMillan Space Centre and the Vancouver Museum complex opened in 1968, thanks to lumber baron MacMillan’s $1.5 million donation.

Deputy Park Board Superintendent William Livingstone, famous for his landscape design for Queen Elizabeth Park and VanDusen Botanical Garden, increased the size of the original park site using tons of free fill from the excavation for the MacMillan Bloedel Building on Georgia Street. The fill added additional acres onto the park which was then landscaped by Livingstone and his crew.

== Attractions ==
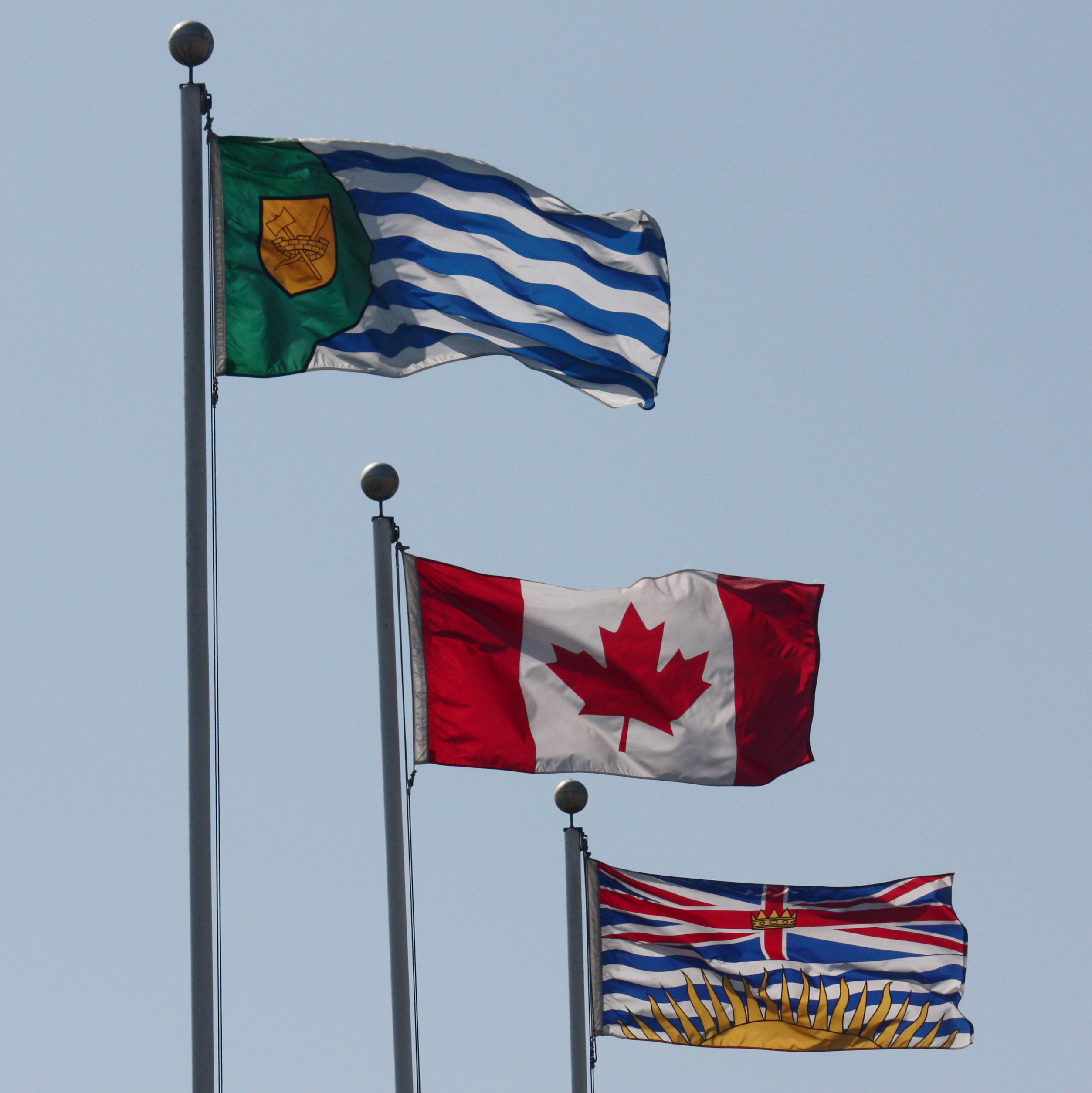
The flags of Vancouver, Canada, and British Columbia flying in Vanier Park

Vanier Park plays host to one of Vancouver’s biggest summer festivals, the Shakespearean Bard on the Beach and formerly the Vancouver International Children's Festival. It is the biggest and most famous of the fifteen parks in Kitsilano.
