= Bard on the Beach =

Annual Shakespeare festival in Vancouver

Bard on the Beach Shakespeare Festival
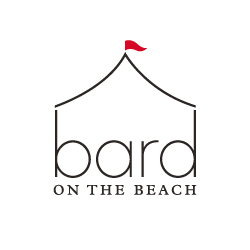
- Location: Vanier Park, Vancouver, British Columbia, Canada
- Founded: 1990
- Founded by: Christopher Gaze
- Artistic director: Christopher Gaze
- Type of play: Primarily Shakespeare
- Festival date: June - September, Annually
- Website: bardonthebeach.org

Bard on the Beach is Western Canada's largest professional Shakespeare festival. The theatre festival runs annually from early June through September in Vancouver, British Columbia, Canada. The festival is produced by Bard on the Beach Theatre Society whose mandate is to provide Vancouver residents and tourists with affordable, accessible Shakespearean productions of the finest quality. In addition to the annual summer festival, the Society runs a number of year-round theatre education and training initiatives for both the artistic community and the general community at large. Bard on the Beach celebrated its 30th anniversary season in 2019.

== History ==
Bard on the Beach began as an Equity Co-op in the summer of 1990, funded primarily by an Explorations Grant awarded to Artistic Director Christopher Gaze by the Canada Council for the Arts. Following his graduation from the Bristol Old Vic Theatre School, Gaze had moved to Canada on the advice of his friend, mentor and theatre legend Douglas Campbell. After performing with a variety of theatre companies and festivals across Canada, including three seasons with the Shaw Festival, Gaze moved to Vancouver in 1983 where he performed as Richard III in the 1984 season of the now defunct Vancouver Shakespeare Festival.

While in Vancouver, Gaze became acquainted with a group of actors and fellow Shakespeare lovers when he was asked to direct a production of Under Milk Wood for the 1989 Vancouver Fringe Festival. The following summer, this same group staged A Midsummer Night's Dream in a rented theatre tent in Vanier Park as the inaugural Bard on the Beach production. The company's initial four-week run drew a total of 6,000 people and signaled the need for a more formal company structure. Bard on the Beach officially registered as a not-for-profit under the Society Act of BC in December, 1990.

== Site ==
Bard is located in Sen̓áḵw (Vanier Park) at the south end of the Burrard Street Bridge. It consists of two performance stages: the BMO Mainstage and the Douglas Campbell Theatre. There is also a group of tents known as the Bard Village which contains the Box Office, Bard Boutique gift shop, and concession stands. The festival grounds also contain dressing rooms, administrative offices for seasonal staff and an event Marquee along with two large picnic lawns and portable washrooms for patrons.

=== BMO Mainstage ===
Bard purchased its first 729-seat saddlespan tent in 1992. By the end of the 2010 season, the Mainstage theatre tent was in need of replacement and, following the "Staging our Future" capital campaign, the Festival built a custom-designed Mainstage theatre tent. The new tent expanded the seating capacity to 742 seats and included a redesigned stage. The theatre tent also came with more comfortable seating for patrons including cup holders for drinks purchased from the concession stands. The new tent maintains an open-backed design and Bard's signature backdrop: False Creek; the Coast Mountains; and city skyline. The physical playing space within the theatre was named after the Bank of Montreal in recognition of their lead contribution to the Festival's capital campaign.

Bard on the Beach typically stages two productions in repertory on the BMO Mainstage in each season, alongside a selection of choral, symphony and opera presentations. The set presents a unique challenge and opportunity for set designers from year to year as it must incorporate elements which can be shared by both productions during season.

=== The Douglas Campbell Theatre tent ===
The Douglas Campbell Theatre tent was added in 1999 as part of Bard's 10th anniversary season as an intimate space for the staging of Shakespeare's lesser-known works or for more modern, innovative stagings of the established canon. Beginning in 2005 with a production of Rosencrantz and Guildenstern Are Dead by Tom Stoppard, the theatre tent has also served as a space for productions of plays which, while not by Shakespeare, serve to examine the context of his work.

The theatre is named for the Canadian stage actor Douglas Campbell. Campbell was a good friend and mentor to Christopher Gaze and had either performed in, or directed, plays in Bard's earlier seasons. Campbell and his son Torquil Campbell also performed together in productions of Henry IV, Part I and Macbeth at Bard on the Beach.

This smaller theatre tent seats 256 people and its adaptable layout and seating configuration are similar to that of a black box theatre. The tent structure was replaced at the beginning of the 2013 season as part of the "Staging our Future" capital campaign.

From 2014 to 2024 the playing space was named the "Howard Family Stage" in honour of Vancouver philanthropists Darlene and Paul Howard. They sponsored this performance space through to and including the 2024 Festival Season.

== Bard Education ==
In addition to operating the Festival, the Bard on the Beach Theatre Society operates a host of youth-oriented outreach programs under the umbrella of Bard Education. Collectively, the programs endeavour to inspire the community through dynamic, engaging experiences with the language, characters and plays of William Shakespeare.

=== Bard in the Classroom ===
Bard in the Classroom workshops are delivered by Teaching Artists – actors, directors and other theatre practitioners trained by Bard to facilitate workshops for young people. The in-class workshops can be adapted for all age groups have been delivered for students between the ages of 4 and 18. Teachers can request 90-minute sessions focusing on introductions to Shakespeare's work as a whole or focus on a specific play, scene or set of characters. Participants mix voice and language work with active theatre exercises to explore Shakespeare's work in a performance context.

=== Professional Development ===
Unlike Bard Education's other programs, Bard's Professional Development workshops are open to educators of all grades, subjects, and levels of experience from across British Columbia. Like Bard in the Classroom, Bard's Professional Development workshops focus on introducing participants to Shakespeare through active theatre exercises however, the program is more focused on teacher training than those programs oriented for students and youth.

=== Bard Summer Camps ===
Bard Summer Camps, formerly Young Shakespeareans Workshops, have been offered each season on the grounds of Bard on the Beach Shakespeare Festival for youth aged 6 through 18 since 1993. Camps run through the months of July and August and offer the opportunity for participants to make Shakespeare's text their own while being coached by professional actors, also known as Bard Teaching Artists.

As of the 2014 season, Bard Teaching Artists are also assisted by participants in the Riotous Youth apprenticeship program.

=== Riotous Youth ===
Conceived as a kind of "graduate" counterpart to Bard Summer Camps, the Riotous Youth theatre apprenticeship program was launched in 2014 to provide an opportunity to bridge the learning of young theatre enthusiasts who had aged out of the workshop program. Participants aged 19 through 24 take an active role in assisting Bard Summer Camp Teaching Artists, deliver pre-show introductory talks to the audience and work with a veteran Bard company actor to prepare a final presentation at the end of the season. The Riotous Youth also participate in a variety of other programs throughout the Bard season including Bard Family Days and off-site presentations.

== Other events ==
In addition to the four plays, there are a number of events throughout the summer:

- Wine Wednesdays
- Family Days
- Bard Explored
- Talkback Tuesdays

== Productions ==
=== 1990 – 1999 ===
1990

- A Midsummer Night's Dream

1991

- A Midsummer Night's Dream
- As You Like It

1992

- Twelfth Night
- The Tempest

1993

- The Taming of the Shrew
- Romeo and Juliet

1994

- The Merry Wives of Windsor
- King Lear

1995

- The Comedy of Errors
- Hamlet

1996

- Much Ado About Nothing
- The Merchant of Venice
- Shylock by Mark Leiren-Young

1997

- Love's Labour's Lost
- The Winter's Tale

1998

- As You Like It
- Richard III

1999

- A Midsummer Night's Dream
- Macbeth
- Measure for Measure

==== Bard Peak Performances (1995–1998) ====
From 1995 to 1998, bard added a short series of Peak Performances to the Festival's season. A selection of weekend matinee performances were presented at the peak of Grouse Mountain in North Vancouver.

=== 2000 – 2009 ===
2000

- The Tempest
- Henry IV, Part 1
- All's Well That Ends Well

2001

- The Taming of the Shrew
- Antony and Cleopatra
- The Two Gentlemen of Verona

2002

- Twelfth Night
- Henry V
- Cymbeline

2003

- The Comedy of Errors
- The Merchant of Venice
- Pericles, Prince of Tyre
- Shylock by Mark Leiren-Young
- A Midsummer Night's Dream (Bard in the Vineyard)
  - Christopher Gaze directed a production of A Midsummer Night's Dream which ran from July 31 to August 31, 2003 at the Mission Hill Family Estate. While the production was successful in reaching new audiences in the Okanagan Valley, the Okanagan Mountain Park Fire had an adverse effect on attendance. In some cases, performances of the production were interrupted as regional evacuation notices were read from the stage.

2004

- Much Ado About Nothing
- The Merry Wives of Windsor
- Macbeth

2005

- As You Like It
- Love's Labour's Lost
- Hamlet
- Rosencrantz & Guildenstern Are Dead by Tom Stoppard

2006

- A Midsummer Night's Dream
- Measure for Measure
- The Winter's Tale
- Troilus and Cressida

2007

- The Taming of the Shrew
- Romeo and Juliet
- Timon of Athens
- Julius Caesar

2008

- King Lear
- Twelfth Night
- The Tempest
- Titus Andronicus

2009

- All's Well That Ends Well
- The Comedy of Errors
- Othello
- Richard II

=== 2010 – 2019 ===
2010

- Antony and Cleopatra
- Falstaff (a combination of Henry IV, Part 1 and Henry IV, Part 2, adapted by Errol Durbach)
- Henry V
- Much Ado About Nothing

2011

- As You Like It
- The Merchant of Venice
- Henry VI: The Wars of the Roses (a combination of Henry VI Parts 1, 2, and 3, adapted by Christopher Weddell)
- Richard III

2012

- Macbeth
- The Merry Wives of Windsor
- The Taming of the Shrew
- King John

2013

- Hamlet
- Twelfth Night
- Measure for Measure
- Elizabeth Rex by Timothy Findley

2014

- A Midsummer Night's Dream
- The Tempest
- Equivocation by Bill Cain
- Cymbeline

2015

- The Comedy of Errors
- King Lear
- Love's Labour's Lost
- World Premiere of Shakespeare's Rebel by Chris Humphreys

2016

- The Merry Wives of Windsor
- Romeo and Juliet
- Othello
- Pericles

2017

- Much Ado About Nothing
- The Winter's Tale
- The Merchant of Venice
- Shylock by Mark Leiren-Young
- The Two Gentlemen of Verona

2018

- As You Like It
- Macbeth
- Timon of Athens
- Lysistrata

2019 (30th Season)

- The Taming of the Shrew
- Shakespeare In Love
- All's Well That Ends Well
- Coriolanus

=== 2020 – present ===
2020

- Cancelled due to the global COVID-19 pandemic in British Columbia. The planned 2020 productions were rescheduled for the 2021 season.
- A Midsummer Night's Dream (cancelled)
- Henry V (cancelled)
- Love's Labour's Lost (cancelled)
- Paradise Lost by Erin Shields (cancelled)

2021

- No in-person presentations due to COVID-19. Digital programming and events offered online.
- Done/Undone by Kate Besworth (commissioned for a digital season)

2022

- A Midsummer Night's Dream
- Harlem Duet by Djanet Sears
- Romeo and Juliet

2023

- As You Like It
- Julius Caesar
- Henry V
- Goblin:Macbeth created by Rebecca Northan with Bruce Horak

2024

- Twelfth Night
- Hamlet
- The Comedy of Errors
- Measure for Measure

2025

- Much Ado About Nothing
- The Two Gentlemen of Verona
- The Complete Works of William Shakespeare (Abridged) [Revised] [Again] by Adam Long, Daniel Singer, and Jess Winfield; new revisions by Daniel Singer and Jess Winfield.
- The Dark Lady by Jessica B. Hill.

2026

- The Merry Wives of Windsor
- Macbeth
- Goblin:Oedipus a Spontaneous Theatre creation
- Antigone
