= Central Branch of Greater Victoria Public Library =

Central Branch
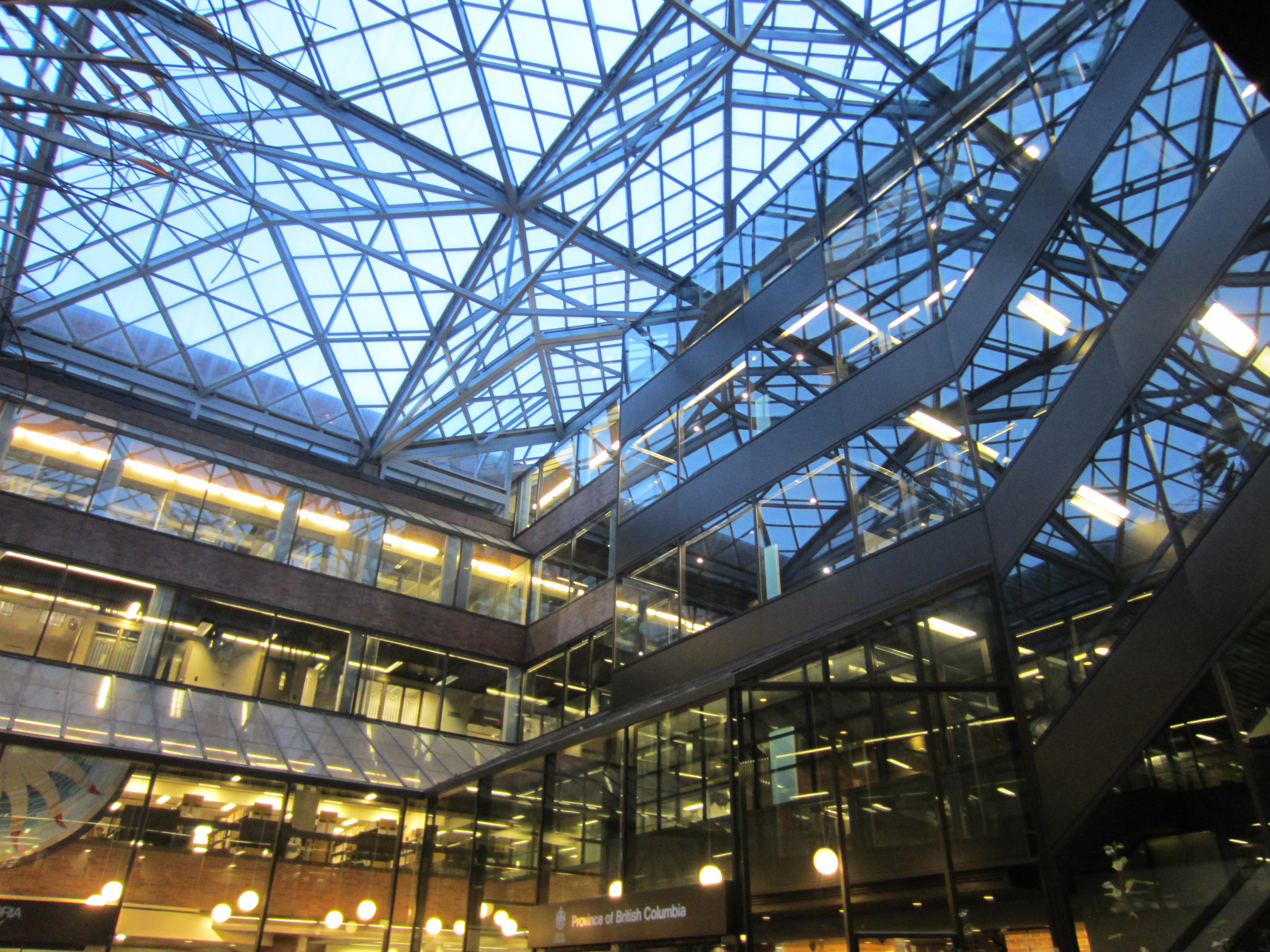
- Interior view, 2012
- 48.4233°N 123.3642°W
- Location: 735 Broughton Street; Victoria, British Columbia; V8W 3H2
- Branch of: Greater Victoria Public Library

Other information
- Director: Martin Brooks, Branch Head
- Website: Central Branch of Greater Victoria Public Library

The Central Branch of the Greater Victoria Public Library (GVPL) is the system's main branch, located at 735 Broughton Street in the downtown core of Victoria, British Columbia, Canada. The Heritage Room includes a special collection with approximately 2,500 items related to the history of Vancouver Island.
