= History of the Squamish people =

Squamish history is the series of past events, both passed on through oral tradition and recent history, of the Squamish (Sḵwx̱wú7mesh), a people indigenous to the southwestern part of British Columbia, Canada. Prior to colonization, they recorded their history orally as a way to transmit stories, law, and knowledge across generations. No writing system was ever created until the 1970s and was based on the Latin alphabet. Most of their history was passed down from one generation to the next. It was considered the responsibility of knowledgeable elders, and also considered very respectable to do so.

In recent history that goes back 200 years, their history includes the European discovery of North America and subsequent colonization of the continent. After the completion of the Canadian Pacific Railway, a massive influx of foreign settlers was brought into their traditional territory and drastically changed their way of life. Policies conducted by the government included the founding and enforcement of the Residential schools on Squamish children, fighting for their rights and land, and their work in restoring their culture.

== Oral history ==
Squamish oral history traces back to "founding fathers" of their people. An aged-informant of the Squamish people named Mel̓ḵw’s, said to be over 100 years old, was interviewed by Charles Hill-Tout in 1897. He recited oral history on the origins of the world, and talked about how "water was everywhere". But the tops of the mountains came out of the sea and land was formed. The first man to appear was named "X̱i7lánexw". He was given a wife, an adze, and a salmon trap. X̱i7lánexw and his wife populated the land and the Squamish descend from these ancestors. Dominic Charlie told a similar story in 1965 about the origins of his people.

Their oral history talks about the Great Flood also. In a story said to happen at Chʼiyáḵmesh (which is where the name of the Cheakamus River comes from), in the Squamish Valley, a man who survived the flood was walking down the river, feeling depressed about the loss of his people from the flood. Then the Thunderbird helped him and gave him food. He continued down the river, with his food gathered by the Thunderbird, when the Thunderbird told him where to stay, and that he would give him a wife. That is where the people of Chʼiyáḵmesh came from. In another story of the first ancestors, two men first appeared at Chekw’élhp and Sch’enḵ, located at what is now known as Gibsons, British Columbia. The first man to appear here was Tseḵanchtn, then the second man appeared named Sx̱eláltn. The people repopulated the land with large families and many Squamish people claim descent from these ancestors.

== Stories ==
=== Transformers ===
A central part of Sḵwx̱wú7mesh history in their oral culture is the stories of supernatural deities often called The Transformers. These Transformers, were three brothers, sent by the Creator or keke7nex siyam. These three beings had supernatural powers, often using them to "transform" individuals into creatures, stone figures, or other supernatural entities.

==== The First One ====
In a story told by Dominic Charlie in 1965, he related about the first origins of his people. Their very first ancestor was a man named X̱i7lánexw , translated as The First One. He was born in a village near Squamish, British Columbia. X̱i7lánexw did not know that his wife was with child, but he knew that someone or something was coming. He knew because of a bird that goes ahead of three supernatural men. These three men, called the Transformers, told the Raven, "You go tell everybody we are coming." The first man understood the bird and he responded by getting ready with his canoe. Near the mouth of the Cheakamus River, is a small mountain, and a little bay that fit his canoe. He tied his canoe here and took out his pole, a long shaft used to pull along the river. He put moss around the pole, then placed the pole down. So when the fish touch the pole, their slime was wiped on the moss. He knew that the Transformers were coming further down river. He would grab the pole and wait for a fish to touch it, then pull out the pole and see where the salmon touched. He took the slime and put it on a wooden plate and put his pole down again. Then he heard the three brothers coming. Then the apocalypse came.

The Transformer brothers also knew where he was, but he didn't look and just held his pole steady. The brothers came and landed on the side of the canoe. They asked the man, "What are you doing?" He responded, "Oh, you are my grandchildren. This here, this is my food that I am going to feed you with." He told the three men, "I have a house right here, right there in that little bay. You bring your canoe over and come up ashore." He pulled up his pole and had a lot of the moss ready. In the house, he had a big fire and a mountain of rock underneath, already hot. He took some sticks and grabbed the hot rocks and put them in a bowl that was filled with water. When the rocks were dropped in, the water began to boil. He took the boiling water and placed the moss inside and then made soup. He told the men to have a seat on his bench with his big hyu7kem plate. This was the first hyu7kem plate made because he knew these men were coming. It made this plate really fancy, and fed them with three Mountain Goat horn spoons. The three men ate the moss.

His wife was always rolling around in pain, and X̱i7lánexw said to the men, whom he called his grandchildren: "I don't know what is wrong with my wife grandchildren." The lead man knew what was wrong, for he was the great Transformer. He knew she was going to have a baby. He told his two other brothers: "You fellows go across and get that tree bark, those green trees over there." He scraped off the bark and then asked X̱i7lánexw if he had a bowl plate and told him to put three rocks in to boil the water. They took the bark of the willow tree, then gave it to the woman to drink. The lead brother told his younger brothers: "You better take your grandfather outside", which they did while the oldest brother stayed with X̱i7lánexw 's wife. Not long after, they heard a baby's cry. He fixed the baby up and taught the woman how to take care of it, and told him about the medicine. He told the man when he came to him, that he had a baby boy. The first baby was a boy, and the next a girl. These two grew up together and married each other. The next baby was a girl, then a boy, and these did the same. This is where all the Sḵwx̱wú7mesh came from.

==== The Defiant One ====
The most well known story is of Slhx̱i7lsh or Siwash Rock. The story passed down tells of a man committed to his marriage, who trained for the coming of his future child by taking morning swims in the water near Ambleside Park in what is now West Vancouver. During his lap returning, the Transformers in their canoe blocked his passage. They told him he had to move and that he could not pass, but his determination told him he would do what he must for his wife and future child. The Transformers were amazed at his defiance of them as the emissaries of the Great Spirit, and decided upon his fate. He would be transformed into the rock outcropping for all future generations to remember his sacrifice for cleanliness and fatherhood. His wife was also transformed into a rock, which is nearby Siwash Rock.

==== The Two Sisters ====
A story tells about two sisters who were daughters of a highly respected siyam or leader of the people. This siyam was at war with a northern people. But the two sisters convinced him to end the war with the northern people. The Transformers saw this act of selflessness and transformed them into two sister mountains for the people to remember their deed. These two mountains are the Lions of Vancouver.

=== The Two-Headed Serpent and the Serpent Slayer ===
In the valley along the Squamish River, there was a large two-headed serpent called Sínulhḵay̓ which terrorized the people, eating them and making a loud screeching noise. In the village of Stá7mes, a young man named Xwechtáal had recently become married and was enjoying the days after the big feast, when his father told him, "You must go kill that serpent." Xwechtáal protested that he had only recently been married, and wanted to enjoy his time with his new wife, start a family, and live his life. He told his father he would not go. The next morning, his father came to his bed and threw glacier cold water on him, waking him up. He told his son again, "You will go kill that two-headed serpent" and this time, Xwechtáal agreed. He told his wife he would only be gone four days, and that she should wait for him until his return.

Following the tracks of Sínulhḵay̓, Xwechtáal could not follow its trail directly because of the power and energy emitted by the serpent wherever it slithered. Seeing where the trail lead, he came to the rock face of the Stawamus Chief Mountain. Xwechtáal saw the serpent's path as it went straight up the face of the cliff, leaving a black line of destruction. The man continued through the mountain pass, following the serpent from lake to lake, and creek to creek. While following the serpent, Xwechtáal would train spiritually by taking morning baths in the creeks, lakes and rivers to cleanse himself and become stronger. Day by day, he would sacrifice more of himself, eating a bit less, and sleeping with less blankets and clothes. All of this was part of his training to kill the serpent.

Finally, he followed the serpent to lake in the mountains. He watched and saw that, while one of the serpents two heads would be awake during daylight, the other would sleep. Then during night, they would switch and the other would stay awake. Training and sacrificing more, Xwechtáal prayed for the answer to defeat the dreaded two-headed serpent. Then one night he had a vision.

In his vision, a woman came to him and told him, "You will make four sharp spears, two for each head, and apply pitch to each spear. You will make a raft and go across the lake. You will spear one head with two of the spears, as that one falls, the other will awake and you must quickly raft across the lake and spear the other head with the two remaining spears. That is how you will kill the serpent."

When he woke up, Xwechtáal followed the instructions and made the spears and the raft. He moved the raft out onto the lake and paddled across with his spears. Grabbing two spears, he attacked the daytime head. As the head began to die and fall, the opposite head woke from its slumber, angry and distressed. Quickly paddling across to the other head, he speared this head with one spear. Then the serpent dove underwater towards a tunnel deep in the lake to escape, but Xwechtáal took the last spear and nailed the serpent head before he got away.

When the serpent fled, part of its body made it into the underwater tunnel. It blocked the passage, and the water began to rise. Xwechtáal passed out, and when he awoke, he was on top of a mountain and the water was everywhere. He waited until the water receded, then climbed down the mountain. Following the mountain to the lake, he found the old corpse of the serpent, but it was just bones. Xwechtáal then took one of the vertebrae of the serpent and acquired magical supernatural powers with it.

On his journey back home, Xwechtáal encountered some mountain goats. He waved his serpent-bone one way and said magical words. As he did this, the mountain goats all fell dead. Cleaning and skinning what he needed, the fed himself and gathered the skins. He then took the bone and waved it the other way, reviving the dead mountain goats and bringing them back to life.

Xwechtáal continued on his journey until he hit a village on the furthest part of Sḵwx̱wú7mesh territory. As he approached, the people came to see who the man was. The people watched as used his magical powers again, killing all the villagers. He then revived them like had done before, bringing them back to life. Seeing his magical powers and abilities, they welcomed him. The siyam or leader of the village then gave Xwechtáal his daughter as a wife.

He continued on, encountering village after village, doing as he had done before and he was given a wife every time. Xwechtáal received wives from all the Sḵwx̱wú7mesh until he finally returned home to Stá7mes. Just as before, the village came forward and watched as he used his magical powers. This time was different. Xwechtáal had noticed that his first wife, from before he left on his journey, had remarried. He also realized he was not gone four days like he expected, but 10 years had passed. Instead of reviving the entire village, he left his ex-wife and her husband dead.

The name was passed down to others through the generations, including Andy Paull.

=== Before official contact: Time immemorial-1790 ===
During the 1770s, smallpox (variola major) eradicated at least 30 percent of the indigenous population on the Northwest coast of North America, including the Sḵwx̱wú7mesh. This disease was one of the most deadly that hit the region over the next 80 to 100 years. During the 80-year period from the 1770s to 1850, smallpox, measles, influenza, and other diseases had killed many villages and communities. In oral histories that survived, describes the 1770s epidemic. An "aged informant" of the Sḵwx̱wú7mesh, in the 1890s, related the history of a catastrophic illness to ethnographer Charles Hill-Tout. He wrote: "[A] dreadful misfortune befell them. ... One salmon season the fish were found to be covered with running sores and blotches, which rendered them unfit for food. But as the people depended very largely upon these salmon for their winter’s food supply, they were obliged to catch and cure them as best they could, and store them away for food. They put off eating them till no other food was available, and then began a terrible time of sickness and distress. A dreadful skin disease, loathsome to look upon, broke out upon all alike. None were spared. Men, women, and children sickened, took the disease and died in agony by hundreds, so that when the spring arrived and fresh food was procurable, there was scarcely a person left of all their numbers to get it. Camp after camp, village after village, was left desolate. The remains of which, said the old man, in answer by my queries on this, are found today in the old camp sites or midden-heaps over which the forest has been growing for so many generations. Little by little the remnant left by the disease grew into a nation once more, and when the first white men sailed up the Squamish in their big boats, the tribe was strong and numerous again" The epidemic of the 1770s was the first and the most devastating more to follow. During the next few decades other damaging outbreaks would attack this area. A smallpox epidemic in 1800–1801, influenza in 1836–1837, measles in 1847–1848, smallpox again in 1862.

=== First contact with Europeans: 1791-1820 ===
The Sḵwx̱wú7mesh were the first indigenous people on the mainland in British Columbia known to have met Europeans, who first came to the head of Howe Sound in 1792 near Stá7mes, a village near the town of Squamish. Along the Burrard Inlet, where numerous villages existed, Spanish Captain Jose Maria Narvaez was the first European to explore this area in 1791. In the following year, 1792, the British naval Captain George Vancouver (1757–1798) met the Spanish expedition in Burrard Inlet.

In oral history passed down through Sḵwx̱wú7mesh families, first contact between the natives and the explorers resulted in Captain Vancouver's shoulder being dislocated. A common game, where two players would try to play a sort of tug-o-war with their arms, a warrior ripped George Vancouver's arm out of its socket, with George thinking of shaking hands.

It was said that some prophets among the nation foreseen the coming of something in the future. Andy Paull notes, "It seems that it was a tradition among Indians of Early days that a calamity of some sort would befall them every seven years. Once it was a flood. On another occasion disease wiped out X̱wáy̓x̱way. Again it was a snow storm which lasted for three months. The wise men had long prophesied a visitation from a great people, from a powerful body of men. Capt. Vancouver came in 1792, a year which coincided with the seventh year, the year in which some calamity was expected, regarding the form of which there was much trepidation, so that when strange men of strange appearance, white, with their odd boats etc., etc., arrived on the scene, the wise men said 'this may be the fateful visitation, what may it bring us', and took steps to propitiate the all powerful visitors"

Captain Vancouver had this to say about the residents of the Burrard Inlet:

Here we met about fifty Indian's, in their canoes, who conducted themselves with the greatest decorum and civility, presenting us with many cooked fish, and undressed, of the sort already mentioned as resembling the smelt. These good, people, finding we were inclined to make some return for their hospitality, shewed much understanding in preferring copper to iron.

A part of the first contact, a number of people in from the Burrard Inlet communities circled the British ships, throwing swan down in the air, customary in their culture to represent peace. At the end of the exchange, numerous mounds of goods were left on the beach as a part of the trade. As Captain Vancouver sailed off, Sḵwx̱wú7mesh families began to pick a part of the traded goods, a custom among Sḵwx̱wú7mesh after potlatches, that is, large amounts of gifts being given away. It was to signify and represent the wealth being distributed to the families of the villages.

=== Westward Expansion: 1821-1885 ===
- Hudson's Bay Company, Fur-trade, gold rush, etc.

=== Indian Act and theft of land: 1885-1923 ===
Around the turn of the 20th century, reserve lands that were plotted and created after the Joint Indian Reserve Commission and McKenna-McBride Commission, were starting to be sold to the government. This was done by families and chiefs, both illegally and legally. One instance was the case of Kitsilano Indian Reserve, the location of which was Senakw, where portions of the reserve were expropriated, both in 1886, and again in 1902. Families were forced into leaving, and promised pay for the "sale". The families that lived in the village were placed on a barge and sent out to sea, with the intent for them to move up to the Squamish River area. It wasn't until 1923 when the reserve chiefs amalgamated into becoming the singular Squamish Band to manage all reserves.

== Assimilation and discrimination ==
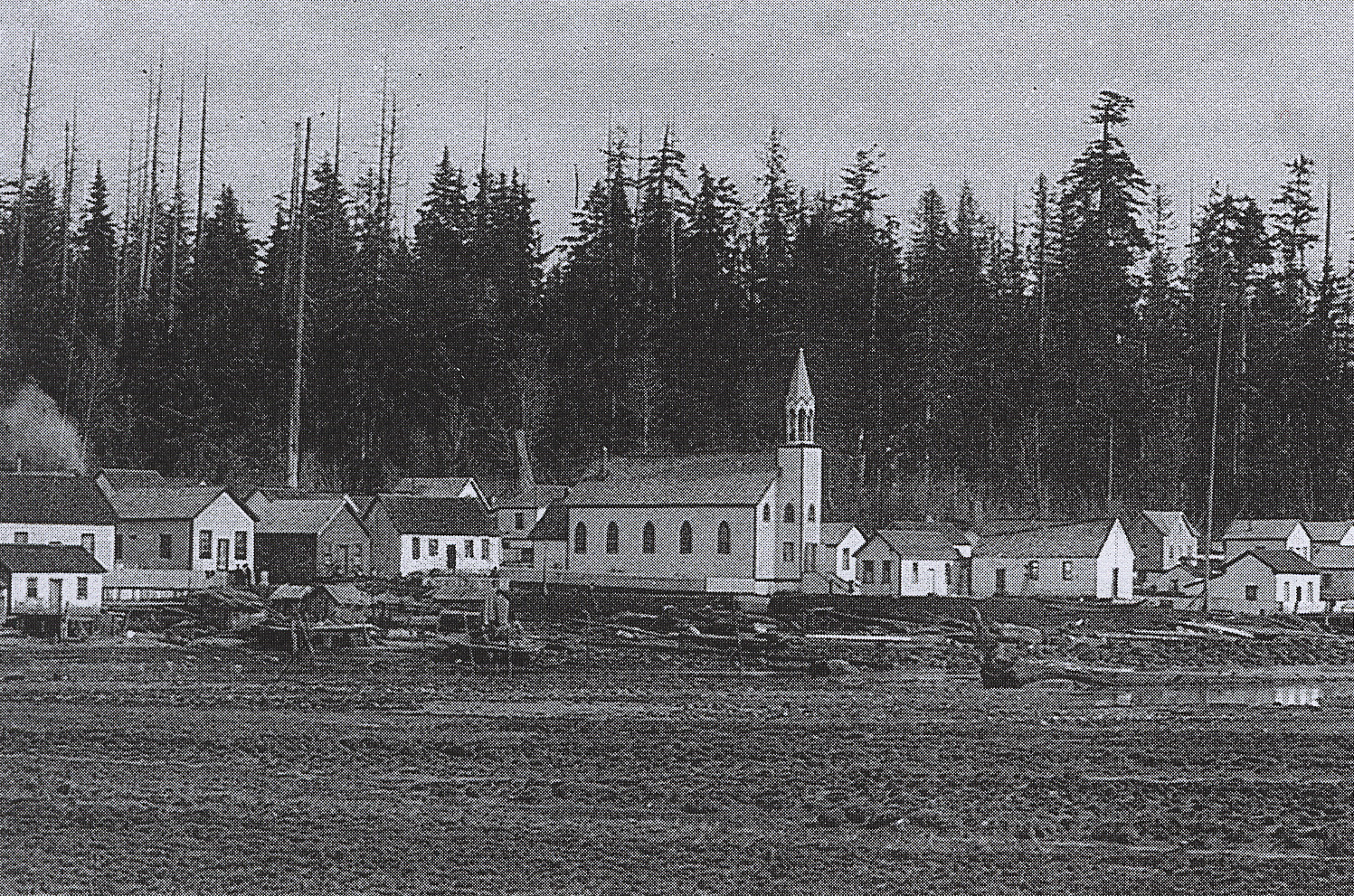
The village of Eslha7an, also called Mission Reserve, was the center of religious conversation for these people. Photographed here is the St. Paul's Catholic Church, the oldest church in British Columbia. Norman Caple photo, City of Vancouver Archives.

Like most indigenous peoples of the coast, the Sḵwx̱wú7mesh were hit hard by the contact of foreign diseases like influenza and smallpox which continued to attack the community in waves throughout the 18th and 19th centuries. Although early trade with the Hudson's Bay Company was largely controlled by indigenous people who vastly outnumbered Europeans, the Fraser River Gold Rush brought a sharp increase of immigration, and more waves of disease. Furthermore, with the proclamation of the Colony of British Columbia, the British became more bold in attempting to assert colonial power.

With expansion from the east, repeated epidemics, and sometimes violent conflict with settlers, the Sḵwx̱wú7mesh people became a minority in their own lands. By the turn of the 20th century, they were outnumbered by European and Asian settlers. With racist policies conducted by Canadian toward indigenous people in the country during the first half of the 20th century little opportunities with the people. Children were forcibly removed from homes to attend residential schools, often very far from home to discourage runaways. Individuals who completed Post-secondary institutional could be "enfranchised" and stripped of their aboriginal status. Most of the population was confined to government-allotted reserve lands (the largest around the village of Chiyakmesh) and not allowed to move about without permission from agents sent by the Department of Indian Affairs.

Later, moves in the 1970 with the Child and Family Ministry of British Columbia, there was a large grab of indigenous children who were then placed in mostly non-indigenous home, located distances away from their ancestral homes. This later led to a lot of problems for returning people back to their native community and a strong strike on cultural practices conducted by the native people.

=== Epidemic ===
Around 1782, a smallpox epidemic hit the Sḵwx̱wú7mesh, coming in through networks in the trade with other nations, then spreading throughout the villages. Population sizes began to drop rapidly, with whole villages being abandoned because of outbreaks. Years later, other serious diseases would strike, with measles, mumps, tuberculosis, influenza and venereal disease further ravaging the Sḵwx̱wú7mesh population, although it wouldn't be until later that the population dropped to below 300.

=== Residential School ===
Like many Indigenous communities across Canada, the Sḵwx̱wú7mesh also have a history of residential schools. The one residential school for was St. Paul’s Indian Residential School in North Vancouver. Some children were also forced to attend school in Sechelt. Some children would attend the school for 10 years at time. The children would be at the school 10 out of 12 months, seeing their parents or grandparents during the summer. Recently many elders are taking the Residential School package being offered by the Federal government.

== Contemporary times ==
At this time, the Sḵwx̱wú7mesh are under the Indian Act and are subjected to band council governments. It is through the Squamish Nation, that partnerships and economic development as made. Among many Indigenous communities throughout Canada, these imposed governments have caused resentment among community members, as they feel they do not represent the people, but are an imposed system of governance.

Currently many cultural revival projects and initiatives are being undertaken by the people themselves and the Squamish Nation itself. Their native language is on the verge of extinction, with around 12-15 speakers left who know the language fluently. A few dozen have learned the language quite fluently, but only later in life. Recently a language immersion school was created with plans to expand further on the program. Other programs and services offered through the Squamish Nation include strong cultural components in their Health, Lands, and Education departments.

== See also ==
- Squamish people (Sḵwxwú7mesh)
- Coast Salish peoples
- History of Squamish and Tsleil-Waututh longshoremen, 1863-1963

== Bibliography ==
- Barman, Jean. Stanley Park's Secret. Harbour Publishing, 2005. ISBN 978-1-55017-420-5.
- Matthews, Major J. S. (1955). Conversations with Khahtsahlano 1932–1954. ASIN B0007K39O2.
- Clark, Ella E. Indian Legends of the Pacific Northwest. University of California Press, 2003. ISBN 0-520-23926-1.
- Hill-tout, Charles. Salish People: Volume II: the Squamish and the Lillooet. Talonbooks, 1978. ISBN 0-88922-149-9.
- Khatsahlano, August Jack and Charlie, Domanic. Squamish Legends: The First People. Oliver N. Wells, June 1966.
- Kolstee, Anton. The Eagle School student dictionary of Squamish language. Carson Graham Secondary School, October 1993.
- Kuipers, H. Alert. The Squamish language: grammar, texts, dictionary. Mouton & Co., 1967.
