= History of Indigenous organizations in Canada =

The self-formation of political organizations of Indigenous peoples in Canada has been a constant process over many centuries.

== Pre-colonial examples ==
The Iron Confederacy and the Blackfoot Confederacy are two prominent pre-colonial examples of collective organization prior to or during the process of colonization. Other groups formed to enter into treaties with colonial governments.

== Early pan-indigenous examples ==
The Grand Indian Council of Ontario and Quebec was established in 1870 composed primarily of Ojibway and Iroquois. In 1915, the Allied Tribes of B.C. was formed by Peter Kelly and Andrew Paull to seek treaties and adequate-size reserves.

After the First World War, the League of Indians in Canada was founded by a Mohawk veteran, Fred Ogilvie Loft (1862-1934). It became the antecedent of the Federation of Saskatchewan Indian Nations and Indian Association of Alberta.

In 1926, the Indian Defense League of America was formed by Chief Clinton Rickard of the Tuscarora Nation, with heavy involvement in US-Canada border crossing problems faced by "Indians" in both countries. Rickard organized an annual celebration to assert border crossing rights, Indian rights generally, and respect for the value and dignity of Indigenous culture.

The Native Brotherhood of British Columbia was founded in 1931 as a province-wide First Nations rights organization.

A split took place in the League of Indians in 1938, and in 1939 the Indian Association of Alberta was formed. After the Second World War, the other faction formed "The Protective Association for Indians and Their Treaties" to advocate for native title and recognition of rights over traditional territories and resources.

== Post-war developments ==
In 1946, after the Second World War, the Union of Saskatchewan Indians emerged from the Protective Association and a newly founded "Association of Saskatchewan Indians."

In 1945, the North American Indian Brotherhood was founded by Andy Paull as a national lobby group which urged extension of voting rights without loss of Indian rights, removal of liquor offences as a way of ending most of the criminal charges faced by Indian people, and advocating pensions and welfare for Indians on the same level as the Canadian population.

In 1956, the Union of Saskatchewan Indians transformed itself into the Federation of Saskatchewan Indians. In 1965, the federation was incorporated by Walter Deiter, Henry Langan, Max Goodwill, Hilliard McNabb and Lucien Bruce. Its objective was to protect Indian treaties and treaty rights; to promote the welfare of the Indians of Saskatchewan, to foster progress in the economic development, education and social life of Indians; and to cooperate with civil and religious authorities in matters pertaining to Indian interests.

With the 1969 White Paper, George Manuel participated in the formation of the Union of B.C. Indian Chiefs to oppose the new proposed policy. The first Chiefs meeting in 1969 was organized by Rose Charlie of the Indian Homemakers Association of BC, Philip Paul of the Southern Vancouver Island Tribal Federation and Don Moses of the North American Indian Brotherhood.

== National organizations ==
The National Indian Council was created in 1961 to represent Indigenous people of Canada, including treaty/status Indians, non-status Indians, the Métis people, though not the Inuit. This organization, however, collapsed in 1967 as the three groups failed to act as one, so the non-status and Métis groups formed the Native Council of Canada and the treaty/status groups formed the National Indian Brotherhood (NIB), an umbrella group for provincial and territorial organizations like the Indian Association of Alberta. The NIB was a national political body made up of the leadership of the various provincial and territorial organizations (PTOs) which lobbied for changes to federal and provincial policies.

In 1970, George Manuel, Noel Doucette, Andrew Delisle, Omer Peters, Jack Sark, Dave Courchene, Roy Sam, Harold Sappier, Dave Ahenakew, Harold Cardinal and Roy Daniels incorporated the National Indian Brotherhood.

A report of the federal Interdepartmental Committee on Indian and Eskimo Policy in July 1971 formed the basis for the Secretary of State Core Funding program for native organizations approved by Cabinet. The government envisaged a neat package of three national aboriginal associations and one regional association per province or territory for each. An adjustment was made in the case of Ontario where Indians had already organized four associations on tribal and treaty lines. The objective was to assist groups "to communicate their needs and views effectively to all levels of government, to participate in the political, social and economic institutions of Canadian society, and to contribute to the development of aboriginal leadership."

In July 1971, the "First National Native Women's Conference" took place.

The Chiefs held their first assembly as "the Assembly of First Nations" (AFN) in Penticton, British Columbia, in April 1982. The new structure, which gave membership and voting rights to individual First Nations chiefs rather than provincial/territorial organizations, was adopted in July 1985, as part of the Charter of the Assembly of First Nations.

== Conflicts ==
The evolution of organizations of aboriginal peoples soon rendered these criteria increasingly inapplicable. In British Columbia (BC), the Native Brotherhood had always represented both status and non-status Indians and the United Native Nations (established following the demise of the BC Association of Non-Status Indians) had aggressively asserted the same principle. Similarly, some of the BC tribal councils, the Council of Yukon Indians (CYI) and the Dene Nation rejected in principle the distinction between status and non-status Indians. This has led to a situation in which the then vice-president of the Native Council of Canada (for non-status people) was a status Indian, while the president of the CYI and the vice-president of the Dene Nation were non-status Indians at this time.

== Provincial and territorial organizations ==
=== Yukon ===
- Yukon Native Brotherhood (1968–1979)
- Yukon Association of Non-Status Indians
- Council for Yukon Indians (1973–present, renamed Council of Yukon First Nations in 1995)

=== British Columbia ===
- Allied Tribes of British Columbia (1919–1927)
- Union of British Columbia Indian Chiefs (1969–Present)
- Native Brotherhood of British Columbia (1931–Present)
- First Nations Summit (1992–Present)

=== Northwest Territories ===
- Indian Brotherhood of the Northwest Territories (1969, renamed Dene Nation in 1978)

=== Alberta ===
- Indian Association of Alberta (1939–Present)

=== Saskatchewan ===
- Federation of Sovereign Indigenous Nations, formerly Federation of Saskatchewan Indian Nations (1958–Present)

=== Manitoba ===
- Assembly of Manitoba Chiefs, formerly Manitoba Indian Brotherhood

=== Ontario ===
- Union of Ontario Indians (1949–Present)

=== Quebec ===
- Indians of Quebec Association (1968-)

=== New Brunswick ===
- Union of New Brunswick Indians (1969–present)

=== Nova Scotia ===
- Union of Nova Scotia Indians (1969–present)

=== Prince Edward Island ===
- PEI Association of Métis and Non-status Indians, (1973, renamed Native Council of Prince Edward Island in 1978)

=== Newfoundland and Labrador ===
- Native Association of Newfoundland and Labrador (1972–1975)
- Federation of Newfoundland Indians (1975–2013)
