= Joseph McKenna (disambiguation) =

Joseph McKenna (1843–1926) was an Associate Justice of the United States Supreme Court.

Joseph McKenna may also refer to:

- Joseph D. McKenna, American Massachusetts state legislator
- Joseph McKenna (Canada) (1862–1919), participant in negotiations with a number of indigenous peoples of Canada
- Joseph G. McKenna (1922–1973), American educator and member of the Congregation of Christian Brothers
- Joseph Neale McKenna (1819–1906), Irish banker and politician
- Joseph McKenna (wrestler), American freestyle wrestler
- Joe McKenna (born 1951), former Irish sportsperson
- Joseph McKenna, member (Volunteer) of the Irish Republican Army
