= History of Squamish and Tsleil-Waututh longshoremen, 1863–1963 =

Mission (Ustlawn) Squamish Indian Reserve, seen across Burrard Inlet from Vancouver c. 1903.

In the late 1870s, Squamish and Tsleil-Waututh communities on the North Shore of Burrard Inlet experienced an increase of physical and economic encroachment from the expansion of neighbouring Vancouver. Faced with urbanization and industrialization around reserve lands, Squamish and Tsleil-Waututh traditional economies became increasingly marginalized, while government-imposed laws increasingly restricted Native fishing, hunting, and access to land and waters for subsistence. In response, these communities increasingly turned to participating in the wage-labor economy.

A significant source of income between 1863 and 1963 was longshoring. This economy would become increasingly important by the early 1900s. In 1906, Squamish and Tsleil-Waututh longshoremen formed the first union on the Vancouver waterfront, Local 526. This union, disbanded in 1907, was the first of several incarnations, namely ILA Local 38–57, the ILHA, and the NVLA.

These unions responded to economic pressures related to an increasingly competitive workforce at the turn of the century. In particular, union activity within the longshoring sector served as a way to advocate for Squamish and Tsleil-Waututh economic interests and livelihoods during a time in which significant social pressures were affecting First Nations in British Columbia.

== Background social and economic history ==
Human settlement in the Lower Fraser region (including present-day Vancouver; see Lower Mainland) began between 8,000 and 10,000 years ago, following the retreat of the Sumas Glacier at the end of the last ice age. The settlement by peoples now known as the Coast Salish predates the arrival of salmon in the river between 4,500 and 5,000 years ago, an occurrence that took place symbiotically with the emergence of Douglas fir, western hemlock, and western red cedar ecosystems between 4,000 and 5,000 years prior to the present day. According to Squamish-Sto:lo author and historian Lee Maracle, Burrard Inlet was inhabited by "Downriver Halkomelem" speaking peoples, the Tsleil-Waututh, and was shared with the Musqueam.

Squamish dwellings at Coal Harbour, Vancouver, 1868.

Contact between Europeans and the indigenous peoples of present-day Vancouver occurred in June 1792. By 1812, Halkomelem peoples had survived three large epidemics from foreign illnesses such as smallpox, introduced through trading routes, including a 1782 outbreak that killed two-thirds of the population. It has been estimated that shortly before the time of first contact and these epidemics, the indigenous population of the Lower Fraser was over 60,000.

An 1830 Hudson's Bay Company census documented 8,954 indigenous inhabitants in the region, although the census was probably incomplete due to the omitting of an unknown number of settlements. As a result of epidemics, the population of the Tsleil-Waututh was reduced to 41 individuals by 1812 from a pre-contact high of 10,000; according to the Tsleil-Waututh Nation, fewer than fifteen individuals remained. At this time, the Tsleil-Waututh invited the neighboring Squamish to reside in Burrard Inlet.

Traditionally, the Squamish and Tsleil-Waututh economy was seasonally based around the harvesting of both terrestrial and aquatic resources, supporting a "kin-ordered" social dynamic that was "flexible and mobile," according to historian Andrew Parnaby. Families often held hereditary access rights to specific resource-harvesting zones, and marriages were often arranged in consideration of ensuring access to these sites. The economies of Northwest Coast cultures, including the Squamish and Tsleil-Waututh, were centered around the potlatch system and the redistribution of wealth; the name potlatch is derived from a Chinook Jargon word meaning "to give." For Squamish and Tsleil-Waututh, potlatching continues to be "the essence of the culture, as it is the cultural, political, economic, and educational heart of the nation."

Waged labor such as longshoring provided a means to support traditional social and economic activities. According to Parnaby, Aboriginal workers participated in the wage-labour economy

while simultaneously maintaining older methods of regulating access to resource sites and affirming links between their families and larger Aboriginal groups. There was a culturally specific logic in operation here that was internal to Coast Salish society: it is likely that Squamish men and women engaged in wage labor because their earnings could be used to purchase the goods necessary to hold a potlatch ... fragmentary evidence reveals that the Squamish continued to hold potlatches

Concerned about access to lands used for traditional livelihoods such as hunting, fishing, and gathering, the Tsleil-Waututh petitioned Queen Victoria in 1873 to address issues surrounding their land rights; in 1906, Squamish leaders traveled to England to voice similar concerns with King Edward VII. Economic marginalization occurred in the context of social pressures related to the Canadian government's assimilation agenda, which included the banning of the potlatch from 1884 to 1951 (see potlatch ban), the imposition of residential schools from the 1870s to 1996, and the Indian Act.

=== Definitions of Aboriginal identity on the Vancouver waterfront ===
On the Vancouver waterfront, the historical definition of distinct Aboriginal workforce communities has been subject to dispute.

Identification with indigenous communities was rooted in a complex history. According to UBC historical geographer Cole Harris, the shifting settlement patterns of local indigenous First Nations groups could arguably be understood as "moving within webs of social and economic relations that connected different individuals and people to each other and each other's places." In the context of race dynamics on Vancouver's post-contact waterfront, the Aboriginal workforce was, while demarcated by white society as homogeneously "Indian," a complex, ethnically heterogeneous entity comprising distinct yet not clearly divisible cultural groups.

Indigenous encampment at Alexander and the foot of Columbia Street, Vancouver 1898. Note the log booms on beach.

While the vast majority of the Aboriginal longshoremen between 1863 and 1945 were members of the Squamish Nation, other Aboriginal groups were also engaged in longshoring and sawmill labor, including Musqueam people from nearby. According to Parnaby,

In the context of the waterfront, 'Indian' was an elastic category that included individuals born to Squamish parents, as well as Aboriginal and non-Aboriginal men who married Squamish women. An assortment of other workers, drawn from a range of national, cultural, and racial backgrounds, including other First Nations, rounded out the ranks of the Indian-dominated [longshoremen] gangs.

According to 1820s-era census figures, approximately three percent of residents in B.C.'s coastal lumber villages were Kanakas, indigenous workers from Hawaii. Kanakas had a long history of intermarriage and social connections with Native groups along the B.C. coast. Some of the workers on Vancouver's waterfront, such as the longshoreman William Nahanee, were of mixed Squamish-Hawaiian heritage. Some Aboriginal longshoremen, such as Harry Jerome (who was of Tsimshian heritage), integrated into Squamish society through intermarriage.

Until relatively recently before the 2000s, the Tsleil-Waututh, whose name means "People of the Inlet," were generally identified as being members of the Squamish Band. Located on Burrard Indian reserve #3 several kilometres east of the Mission, Seymour Creek, and Capilano Squamish Nation Indian Reserves, the Tsleil-Waututh were never formally incorporated into or amalgamated with the Squamish. The confusion of identities was likely compounded by the fact that historically, following the first smallpox epidemic, many Tsleil-Waututh started speaking the Squamish language in place of Downriver Halkomelem, a practice that continues to this day.

As a result of being identified as Squamish, Tsleil-Waututh longshoremen have often been referred to under an assumed Squamish identity. For example, Parnaby's book Citizen Docker states that longshoreman Dan George "became chief of the Squamish band in the 1950s" but does not mention that he was also a Tsleil-Waututh, born on Burrard Indian Reserve #3 in 1899. Today, the Tsleil-Waututh membership includes more than 600 individuals, while the Squamish Nation currently has about 4,000 members.

== The beginnings of Aboriginal lumber longshoring in Vancouver ==
Squamish Longshoremen, Moodyville Sawmill, Vancouver, Canada, 1889. According to Vancouver Archives, Squamish longshoreman William Nahanee is pictured in front-centre with laundry bag; the original caption erroneously identified him as Chinese.

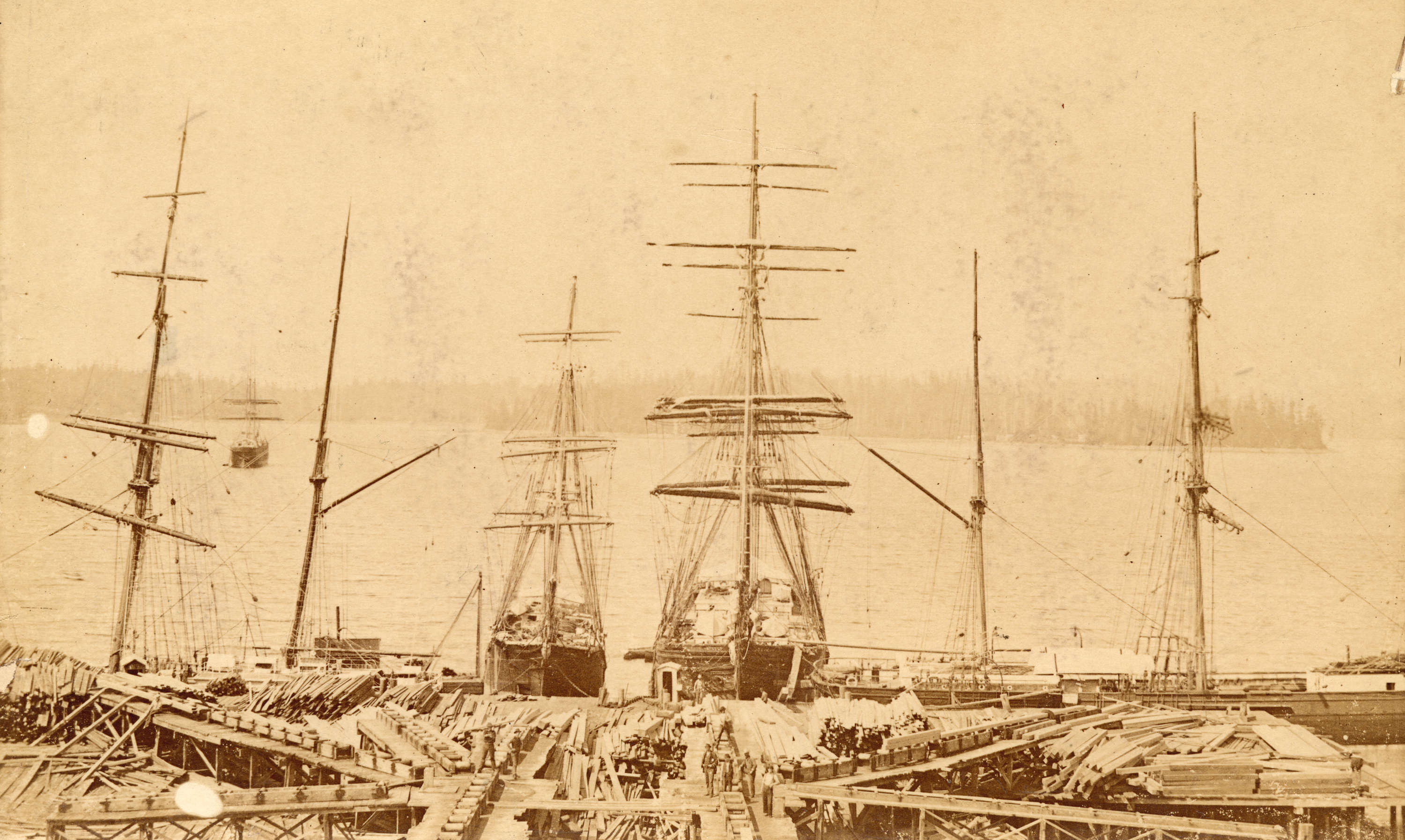
Hastings Sawmill yard across from Stanley Park, Vancouver, Canada 1886. Loading lumber onto ships in Vancouver Harbour.

In 1863, a sawmill operated by the British Columbia Mill Company was opened on Burrard Inlet. This was the third sawmill to open in B.C., after the ones in Yale and New Westminster in 1858 and 1860 respectively. Burrard Inlet was an ideal sawmill location, due to its close access to significant reserves of cedar and fir coupled with a deep, sheltered natural harbor. Originally, Squamish settlement on Burrard Inlet was seasonal, with the Squamish visiting during the spring and early summer for the purposes of hunting, fishing, and trade. Shortly after the mill opened, Squamish workers began moving into the area in larger numbers; with the establishment of industry within their territories, the Squamish adapted to incorporate wage labor into their traditionally seasonal mixed-resource economy. In addition to existing traditional subsistence economies such as fishing, hunting, and gathering, the Squamish and Tsleil-Waututh began to engage in some of these seasonal activities commercially, particularly industrialized fishing using modern equipment such as the gill net. Fish cannery workers (see Gulf of Georgia Cannery) were predominantly Aboriginal until the 1870s and 1880s. New economies such as forestry—namely logging, mill work, and longshoring—generally constituted short-term, casual labour. Aboriginal men who worked in these sectors tended to work for short, intense periods of time to accommodate their work patterns in other seasonal economies, including hop-picking in the lower Fraser Valley and northern Washington State.

Unlike other economies which were family-oriented and gender-mixed, such as fishing and hop picking, or predominantly female, such as salmon canning and small-scale agriculture, forestry work was exclusively performed by men. Logging was, by nature, a short-term activity, in which men would work for several weeks in the forest before returning to the cities to await the next crew selection. Mill work and longshoring, by contrast, were often more continuous forms of employment. However, due to the shortage of labour which lasted until the 1900s, Native workers were in the advantageous position of being able to work intermittently as best suited to their own independent economic interests. In 1893, a recently appointed "Indian Agent Devlin" remarked that "a great many of the (Squamish) men are employed in the lumber mills in Vancouver."

As sawmill work became increasingly specialized and the labour market increasingly competitive, Aboriginal involvement in that sector declined. Like other ethnic groups at the time, the Squamish and Tsleil-Waututh shifted focus to specialize in longshoring. For many Aboriginal workers, who collectively held a significant employment repertoire in logging and sawmill work, the transition to longshoring was logical. Familiarity with the physical nature of handling lumber, as well as its attendant skills, such as knowing how to operate logging and milling equipment, enabled Native workers to become quickly familiarized with the waterfront work environment.

== Work environment: lumber handling ==
According to veteran longshoremen, four to six gangs of predominantly Aboriginal longshoremen worked the docks on any given day during the early 1900s; depending on the size of ships and whether they were in the process of being loaded or unloaded, between forty and ninety Aboriginal longshoremen could be found handling lumber on any given day. By the early 1920s, this figure climbed to an average estimate of 125 workers a day, according to Department of Labour statistics.

Lumber ships, Hastings Sawmill, Vancouver, 1890

Roine states, "[lumber] longshoring was a difficult and often dangerous form of work, but it offered slightly higher wages than did general labour in a sawmill and provided the opportunity to work intermittently and pursue other activities when so desired". Lumber longshoring consisted of handling raw, unprocessed logs and milled lumber into the holds of ships. In the early days of longshoring, this entailed transporting logs by hand into sailing ships by maneuvering them through portholes or the stern, or by sliding them down "a series of ramps to the ship's hold." Milled lumber was loaded into a sling and lifted by cable with a steam-powered engine into the ship holds. The engines for these lift systems were called "donkeys" and were positioned on either docks or barges. According to dock worker Ray Mason, who began working on the waterfront in 1913,

And at that time they had donkey engines on scows [barges]. The ships had stern ports and everything was hauled in with the donkey through or over the stern. Of course, at that time the Indians from the North Shore [of Burrard Inlet] did all that work.

By the 1920s, steam-powered vessels had almost entirely replaced sailing ships, leading to increased mechanization; deck-mounted winches and derricks or cranes were used to move the lumber. While repetitive and physically demanding, longshoring lumber was a skilled profession that saw men develop specialized positions within each work gang. Knowing how to maneuver lumber on and off a ship required significant know-how. For example, in the words of famed Tsleil-Waututh longshoreman, chief, Hollywood celebrity, and Native rights activist Dan George:

Some of the timber were ninety feet long—so big that when the ship finally got to England, they didn't know how to handle the cargo, and we had to send men over to unload. Mostly I loaded forty-foot lengths. They could be loaded one at a time, so a five-masted schooner might take anywhere from three to six months to load.

Edward Nahanee, a longshoreman and resident of the Squamish Reserve at Mission (Ustlawn), stated:

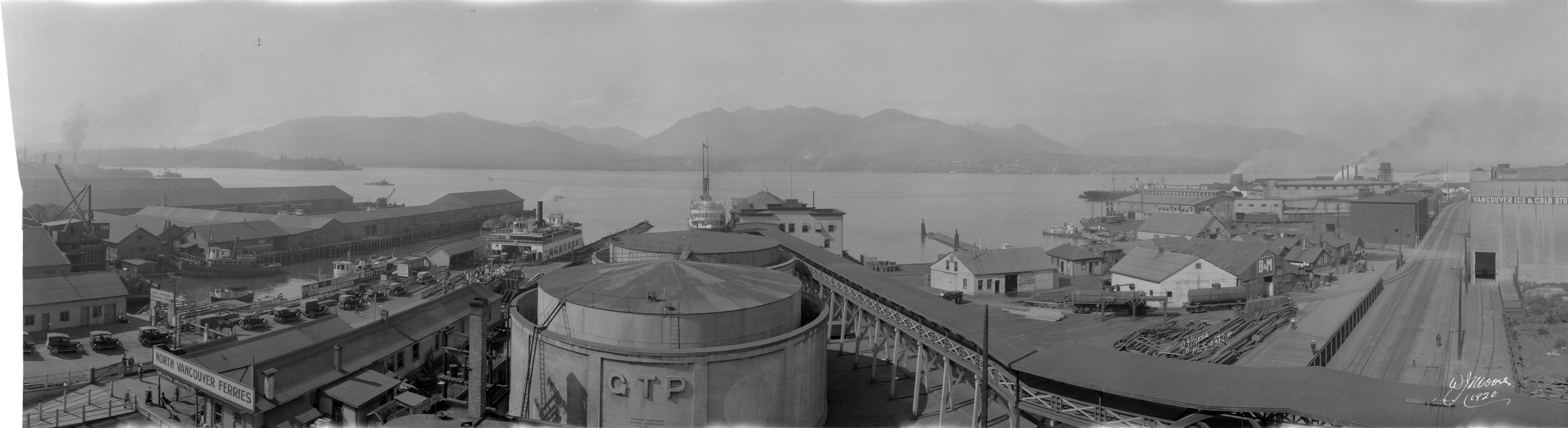
Vancouver waterfront in 1920, overlooking Burrard Inlet toward North Vancouver (including Stanley Park, left; Capilano Indian Reserve, centre-left; and Mission Indian Reserve, centre)

When I was running side I used to watch the load coming down the hatch. There might be six or eight timbers in the load and I would size it up as soon as it landed I would know where each timber was going.

The specialized ability to fit lumber into a ship was a role that many Aboriginals gained respect for, while also reinforcing a causal notion of race as a determinant of skill for certain tasks. According to historian Rolf Knight, the role of racialization in dock work was a factor in the prominence of Aboriginal men performing lumber longshoring: "loading lumber was one of the more strenuous kinds of longshoring, [so] that employers attempted to maintain competition between racially distinct crews and that a reluctance seems to have developed among employers to hire Indians to handle [non-lumber] cargo". Forty-five-year veteran waterfront worker Sam Engler stated that white longshoremen were given preference for the best above-deck jobs, saying "[The Indians] used to call us white brothers and we were getting the choice jobs". In response to these pressures, the use by Aboriginal workers of the Squamish language helped establish camaraderie, while also enabling them to subvert authority by being able to keep their conversations socially encrypted from the oversight of white employers and colleagues.

At the turn of the century, several Squamish men such as Dan Paull and Chief Joseph Capilano would go on to become foremen, allowing them to hire their friends and family for longshoring. The reputation of Aboriginal longshoremen came to be seen not only as a result of training and specialization but, in the words of Parnaby, was shaped by a perception that their abilities were "perhaps of biology; [that] they were naturally suited to that sort of work." Undertones of racialization might be interpreted from the quote of one longtime dock worker, who referred to the Native longshoremen as "the greatest men who ever worked the lumber."

== Union organizing and political activism, 1906–1923 ==
In the early decades of the 1900s, the forest products economy was deeply divided by ethnicity. According to 1918 statistics, over ninety percent of workers in British Columbia logging camps were white; by contrast, in 1910 the vast majority of workers in sawmills were of Asian origin, particularly Sikhs from India (several hundred of whom arrived in 1906). This scenario of racial polarization resulted in a divided environment for union activity, which may have hindered opposition to industry restructurings that would ultimately affect Aboriginal longshoremen. Existing white unions refused to allow members of "Indian Gangs" into their membership.

The first effort at organized labor activism of Vancouver longshoremen occurred in 1888, when a number of longshoremen became members of an American trade union called the Knights of Labor that had been formed in 1869. In 1906, an estimated fifty to sixty lumber handlers, mostly Squamish, formed Local 526 of the Industrial Workers of the World (IWW). This constituted the first union on the Vancouver waterfront. The informal name for the union was the "Bows and Arrows," a title reflective of the politicized indigenous ethos of its membership base. The union's casual structure, with members continuing to maintain seasonal employment in hunting and fishing, likely resonated with the IWW's ethos of decentralized organization (like the Squamish and Tsleil-Waututh, IWW ideology was "rooted in part in the itinerant lifestyle of its members"). Meetings were held on the Mission Reserve in North Vancouver. After a "nasty" strike in 1907 that included both Aboriginal and non-Aboriginal workers, the union was dissolved.

Departure of Coast and Interior Salish Chief's Delegation to England, 1906. Chief Joe Capilano pictured centre, with robe over arm. Photo taken on North Vancouver ferry dock. Chief Capilano, alongside 'Chief Basil' and 'Chief Harry,' forwarded their grievances to King Edward VII in person.

1906 was a politically significant year for Coast and Interior Salish indigenous communities. In addition to the formation of Local 526, representatives from both communities gathered on Vancouver Island for the purpose of nominating a special three-chief delegation to travel to London, England to directly petition their land title grievances to King Edward VII.

Chief Capilano was subsequently nominated to travel to England alongside two chiefs known as "Chief Basil" and "Chief Charlie." After they were toured around London by Canadian High Commissioner Lord Strathcona, it was reported that they were successful in meeting King Edward; a detailed description of the meeting was articulated in an interview with The Province by Chief Capilano shortly before his death in 1910.

While they were not successful in addressing land claims title, the unity expressed by distinct indigenous communities in organizing this venture marked a significant development in the history of grassroots "pan-Indian" Native political organization in the Pacific Northwest. Longshoring played an important role in facilitating this organization; Chief Capilano paid for his journey to England from his longshoring wages. In 1928, Chief Capilano travelled to Ottawa with twenty-five other Aboriginal leaders to meet with then-Prime Minister Wilfrid Laurier over First Nations concerns.

On March 30, 1912, predominantly white longshoremen formed the Vancouver Local of the International Longshoremen's Association (ILA) with sixty charter members. In 1913, Squamish and Tsleil-Waututh workers organized (with approximately ninety percent support, according to one source) an independent indigenous ILA local, deciding to formally disband IWW Local 526.

Influenced in part by the increased familiarization with the English language among Aboriginal longshoremen, who listened in on workplace conversations between white co-workers, as well as a recognition of the changing nature of longshoring, which was becoming increasingly diversified and less centered around lumber exports, the new union became established as ILA Local 38–57. William Nahanee, along with his son Edward Nahanee, became the president and vice president of Local 38–57, respectively. In maintaining its independence as an indigenous political organization, Local 38-57 could more effectively articulate and assert the needs of its workers in an increasingly globalized shipping environment. As historian William Mckee has noted, the establishment of these two unions meant "the foundations of modern labour relations had been laid on the Vancouver waterfront."

Local 38-57 lasted as an independent organization until 1916, when it merged with Local 38–52. Subsequently, the Vancouver ILA supported the One Big Union, a left-wing revolutionary union formed in 1919 which was particularly prominent in Western Canada, forming during the Winnipeg General Strike. This arrangement, which saw involvement with numerous job actions including the general strike of 1918, would last until the strike of 1923.

== Waterfront decasualization, 1923–1963 ==
While the Squamish may have been initially opposed to the strike of 1923, their role would eventually become quite active. William Nahanee, who served on the union's negotiating committee, travelled to Chemainus to meet with striking Aboriginal waterfront workers. The lengthy strike of 1923 marked a time of transition for Aboriginal longshoring unions. After being weakened by successive strikes, to which Dan George spoke of "strike after strike and our union broken completely," the Shipping Federation's agenda of decasualization and welfare capitalism would become increasingly dominant on the Vancouver waterfront.

Longshore workers at Pacific Terminal in 1945, Port of Vancouver, Canada. Note the presence of dockside gantry cranes in the background. For Aboriginal longshoremen, negotiating access to work with an increasing diversity of cargo types was crucial as the world shipping economy became more mechanized and complex.

For Aboriginal longshoremen, the fallout of the strike was significant; most lost their jobs or only retained minimal work afterwards; many were blacklisted outright. As a result, many Squamish and Tsleil-Waututh men had to resort to relief from the Squamish band council trust fund to make ends meet. They also returned to subsistence fishing, as well as commercial fishing and cannery work. Dan George left longshoring in order to resort to hand logging on the Reserve so that he could make a living for his family; in his words, "Things were so confused on the waterfront. So I kept loggin' on my own." And in the words of Edward Nahanee, "In ten days it was all over. We lost our jobs and everything."

In 1924, under the leadership of Squamish activist Andrew Paull, Aboriginal longshoremen formed a new union, the ILHA, to try and protect remaining Aboriginal jobs and the freedom to work seasonally. As a result of pressure from the predominantly non-Aboriginal and increasingly rival ILA, the ILHA quickly became weakened and subject to new regulations that favored full-time decasualized labor organization. The ILHA was soon flooded with 200 to 300 non-Aboriginal workers from many ethnic backgrounds, before shrinking to "around seventy-eight men, of whom only five can be identified as Aboriginal."

During the six-month strike of 1935, a 900-man walkout that saw the violent Battle of Ballantyne Pier, increasing numbers of de-unionized Aboriginal men began returning to the docks as replacement workers. On December 9, 1935, the union ended the strike in capitulation. In the opinion of longshoreman Tim Moody,

Some would call us strikebreakers. But that is a matter of opinion. The men whose jobs we took were those who broke the strike in 1923. My father said my grandfather had been a longshoreman and we had to hang on to what he had started. It was all we had.

Shortly thereafter, the Canadian Waterfront Workers' Association (CWWA) was created by the Shipping Federation in partnership with the provincial government. It was an organization in which strikes, demonstrations, and "affiliate[ion] with any radical movement" were outlawed; its membership requirements included the conditions that all members had to be "white" males and "residents of Vancouver" for at least one year.

The Shipping Federation also decided to "revitalize" the North Vancouver Longshoreman's Association (NVLA). The rationale was to reward strike-breaking Aboriginal longshoremen, who comprised approximately forty to fifty-five of the eighty-six workers in the Association, with a guarantee of ten percent of the waterfront employment. In spite of the Depression, the Native workers fared quite well; dominating the NVLA executive, they received nearly equal access to working the same types of cargo that other gangs were handling, in contrast to earlier times when non-lumber-handling jobs were given to white workers.

Within this union, Aboriginal longshoremen received the right to a casualized workplace where they could freely pursue other economic ventures alongside longshoring. This sensibility persisted into the late 1930s, 1940s, and even the early 1950s. In 1953, strict rules were finally implemented based on seniority and leave-of-absence membership conditions. In the words of one Aboriginal longshoreman who decided to specialize in longshoring in 1953, "It was murder at first [to give up fishing]. But now we've got no squawks. I wanted to live here in town and it was getting too hard to make any money fishing."According to waterfront scholar Stuart Jamieson, Aboriginal involvement in longshoring declined after 1945, with the numbers dropping to twenty-five workers in 1954. In 1963, thirty-three Aboriginal workers were engaged in longshoring.
