= Cheakamus =

Cheakamus is an anglicization of Chiyakmesh, the Skwxw7mesh language name for one of their villages, now located on Cheakamus Indian Reserve No. 11.

Cheakamus may also refer to:

- Cheakamus River
- Cheakamus Lake
- Cheakamus, British Columbia, a Squamish community
- Cheakamus Powerhouse, on the Squamish River
- Cheakamus (ship), see Union Steamship Company of British Columbia
