= Siwash Rock =

Rock Outcrop in Vancouver, Canada

Coordinates: 49.308775°N 123.156058°W

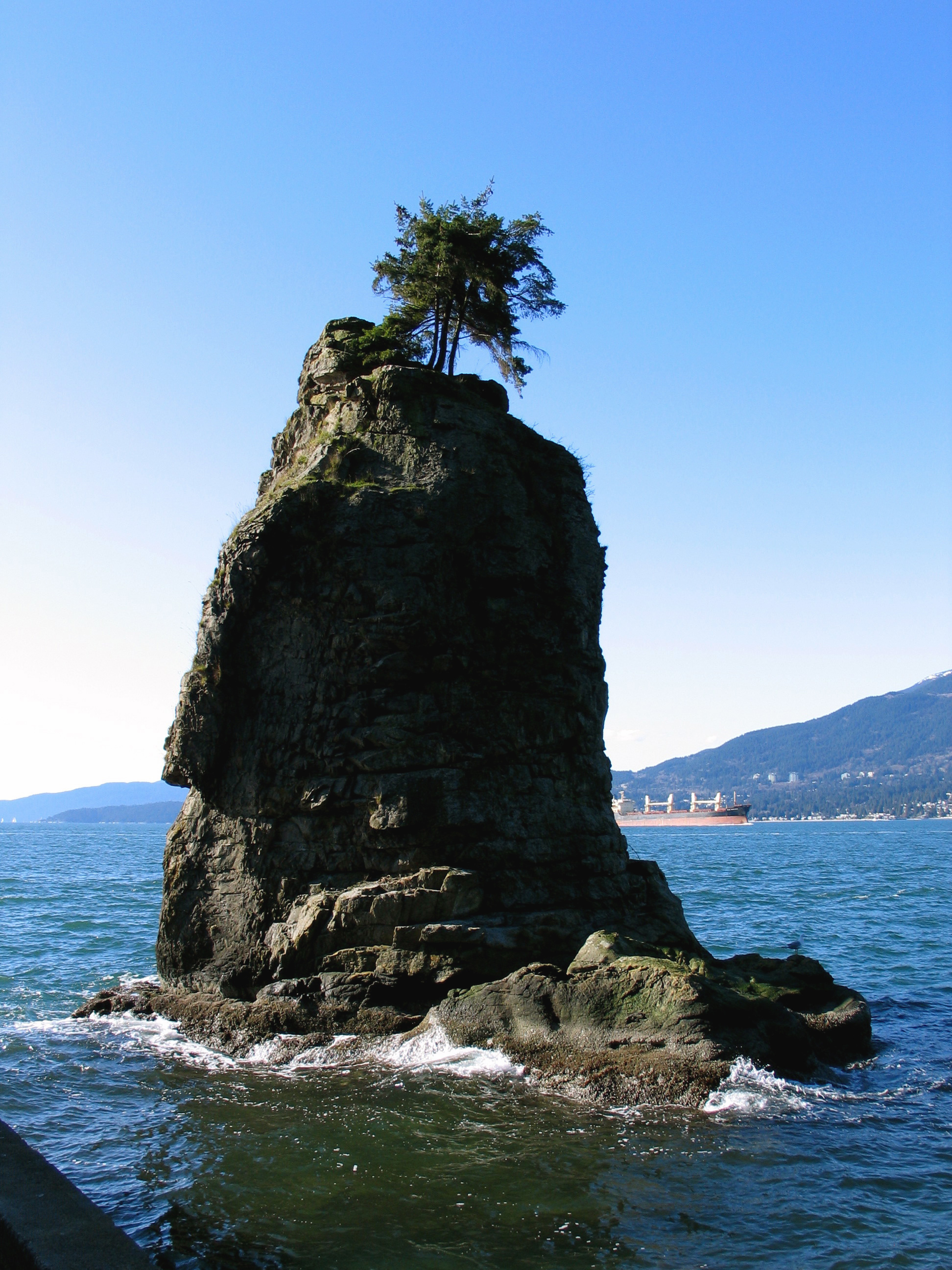
Siwash Rock in 2006

Siwash Rock is a rock outcropping in Vancouver, British Columbia, Canada's Stanley Park. A legend among the Indigenous Squamish people surrounds the rock. It is between 15 and 18 metres (49 and 59 ft) tall. It became known to mariners as Nine Pin Rock for its resemblance to a bowling pin.

== Geology ==
About 32 million years ago, a volcanic dike formed in the sedimentary rock that forms the foundation of the park (sandstone and mudstone). Magma was forced to the surface through a fissure in the Earth's crust creating the basalt stack, which is more resistant to erosion than the softer sandstone cliffs. Siwash Rock is the only such sea stack in the Vancouver area.

== Name ==
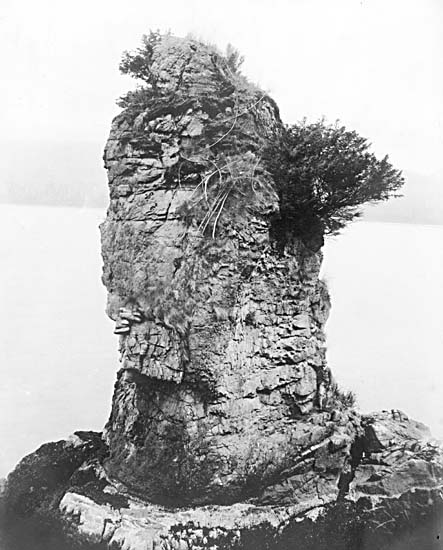
Siwash rock in the 1890s

The Squamish name for the rock is Slhx̱i7lsh, or sometimes Lhilhx̱í7elsh. This name refers to the story of 'a man transformed by X̱ays'. The hole in the rock is where Slhx̱i7lsh kept his fishing tackle, according to Andrew Paull. In Legends of Vancouver, poet Pauline Johnson relates a Squamish legend of how a man was transformed into Siwash Rock "as an indestructible monument to Clean Fatherhood." A plaque near the rock (pictured) states that it is "Skalsh the unselfish", who was transformed by "Q'uas the transformer" as a reward for unselfishness.

There is some controversy over the name of the rock. Siwash is a Chinook Jargon word for a person of First Nations or Native American heritage. Though the word siwash in the jargon did not necessarily have a negative connotation and was used by native peoples themselves, its etymology can be traced to the French word sauvage, which means 'savage', 'wild' or 'undomesticated'. The word is considered by some to be derisive, but remains in use in certain place names such as with Siwash Rock, Siwash Sweater, etc.

== History ==
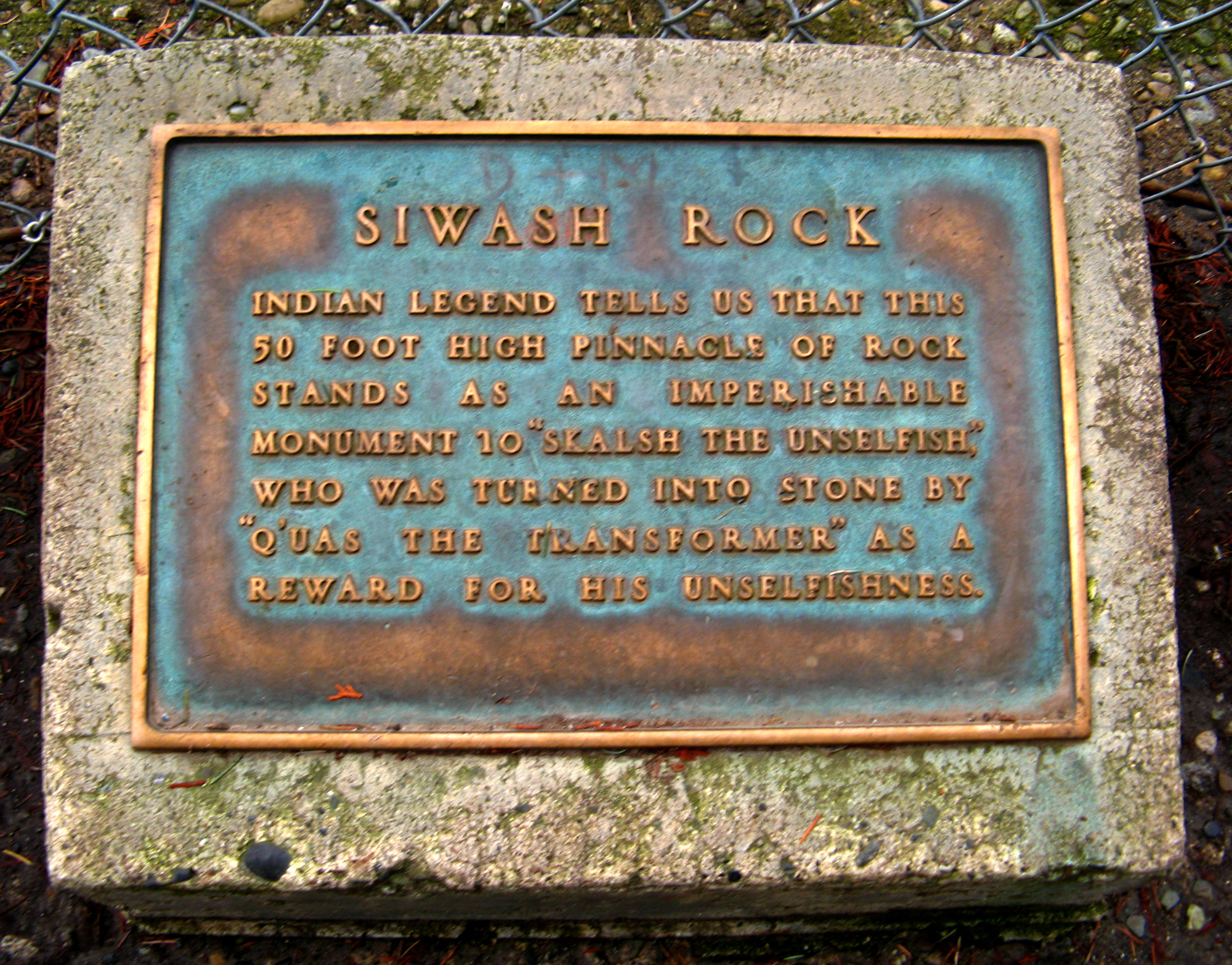
Plaque marking Siwash Rock

Up on the cliffs overlooking Siwash Rock is a lookout point off the Siwash hiking trail. While today it is an ideal spot for park users to admire the scenery, it was known as "Fort Siwash" during the wars. An artillery battery was mounted there in the First World War, as were searchlights in the next war. A runaway mountain goat, according to park board lore, lived free in this area for almost a year in the mid-1960s until he was hit by a car and died in another area in the park. Also residing in this area, until he was arrested shortly after the Second World War, was a man living in a nearby cave for a 17-year period interrupted only by his service overseas to fight in the war.

The small Douglas fir atop Siwash Rock that helped make it such a distinctive landmark for the first generations of Vancouverites did not survive the exceptionally dry summer of 1965. An article on the tree's passing in the Vancouver Sun reads more like an obituary than news story, quoting former Vancouver Member of Parliament, H. H. Stevens as saying "I've known that tree for about 68 years now and I'm sorry the tree has died because it was one of our main attractions in Stanley Park." A park superintendent felt sure that it was "virtually impossible to establish another fir up on the rock from a young plant." Less than three years later, however, while park crews were still working to restore the park's forest from the devastation of Typhoon Freda, persistent efforts were rewarded when new saplings finally began taking root.

In 2017, Vancouver Park Board commissioner Catherine Evans introduced a motion to change the rock's official name to Slhx̱í7lsh. As Siwash is derived etymologically from sauvage (the French word for savage), Evans said: "We shouldn't have a name for any part of our land that is derogatory to the Indigenous people of this land."

== See also ==
- History of the Squamish people
