= St. Paul's Indian Residential School =

Location
- City of North Vancouver; Canada; 49.3196°N 123.0875°W

Information
- Type: Canadian Indian residential school
- Religious affiliation: Roman Catholic
- Established: 1899
- Closed: 1958

St Paul’s Indian Residential School (also known as the Squamish Indian Residential School or St. Francis Indian Residential School) was a Canadian Indian residential school located in the City of North Vancouver, in the 500 block of West Keith Road on what is now the parking lot of the St. Thomas Aquinas Regional Secondary School. It was a Roman Catholic school operated from 1899 to 1958 by the Order of the Oblates of Mary Immaculate. The students of the school came from the adjacent Mission Reserve as well other Squamish, Tsleil-Waututh and Musqueam peoples.

== History ==
The Parish of St Paul's was established by Father Leon Fouquet who constructed the St Paul's Indian Church, which opened as a chapel in 1866. When Bishop Pierre-Paul Durieu came to the church to work with the Squamish people, he decided to provide schooling for them. He led the construction of St Paul's School on the Mission Reserve in North Vancouver. In 1898 he wrote to the motherhouse of the Sisters of the Child Jesus in Le Puy-en-Velay, France. The first three sisters arrived on October 5, 1898, making it the first school for First Nations people on the North Shore. The Squamish people supported the school with food and other donations until 1900 when the Department of Indian Affairs took over administration of the school. Indian Affairs' intention was to assimilate the First Nations people by denying them rights to their language, culture and traditions while forcing them to take on the British language, culture, traditions and religion. In 1920 the Indian Act was amended and Canadian federal legislation made it mandatory for every Indian child to attend a residential school upon reaching 7 years of age until 16 years of age. Most of the children came from the surrounding Squamish Nation reserves along Burrard Inlet, Howe Sound, and the Squamish River. Other students came from the Tsleil-Waututh and Musqueam nations, and others from as far away as the Lil'wat (Mount Currie) band, near Pemberton, as well as the Shishalh (Sechelt) and Sto:lo peoples. Over 2000 students in six generations attended the school, arriving at between 4 and 6 years of age. The students stayed until the eighth grade, or until the age of 16. Very few made it to twelfth grade graduation. Children in the school were segregated by age group and gender and were often not permitted to visit other family members in the school. They were stripped of their culture and punished for speaking their native languages or taking part in their cultural traditions. In the early 1930s, officials reported that children at the school were underfed, and that the building was a "'death trap' and a 'fire trap.'"

Survivors who spoke at a hearing of the Truth and Reconciliation Commission (TRC) spoke of physical, sexual and emotional abuse at the school.

Squamish Nation spokesperson Khelsilem said St. Paul’s Indian Residential School was a “horrific place of abuse for many Squamish and other Indigenous peoples."

Andy Paull, one of the leaders of the Allied Tribes of British Columbia - "an organization of coastal and interior Indians whose primary purpose was the advancement of the land claim [demanding recognition of ancestral rights]," received the first six years of his education at the St. Paul's Indian Residential School. Paull's time at residential school was clearly important to him as he maintained a close relationship with a number of the oblates and nuns for his entire life. Some of the knowledge and skills needed to resist the system were gained from within the system. Paul Tennant, for example, notes: "By bringing together children from different tribal groups and by keeping them together for long periods away from traditional influences, while at the same time isolating them from white society, the schools promoted... pan-Indian identity and provided future leaders with essential political resources."

== Contemporary building ==
The St Paul’s Indian Residential School was torn down in 1959. The site was turned over to the Catholic archdiocese, which supervised the building of St Thomas Aquinas Catholic High School on the grounds. First Nations students were allowed to attend this school and came from the Squamish Nation, Mt Currie and Powell River, under the direction of the Department of Indian Affairs. The high school still remains on the original site today and some Squamish students still attend each year.

== Memorial ==
On August 13, 2013 the mayor of the City of North Vancouver agreed to construct a monument honoring the survivors from St Paul’s Indian Residential School. The memorial is an art piece in the form of a wave with a high point representing pre-European contact, a low point in the wave representing the residential school era and a rising wave with a canoe and two children representing the First Nations recovering from the experience. The base is made of concrete and the canoe and children are carved red cedar. This is a Squamish Nation design and installation by Jason Nahanee, a residential school survivor who started attending St. Paul’s at the age of 3. He also carved the red cedar.

The monument is located on the grounds of St. Thomas Aquinas High School. There is a 4’x 8’ plaque with at least 400 names of students that attended that includes a history of the school's opening. The designer of the plaque is a close family member of a residential school survivor named Shain Jackson. The monument was funded by Ustlahn Social Society of the Squamish Nation, The Indigenous Women's Studies Institute (Founded by Kultsia Barbara Wyss), The Squamish Nation, The Sisters of the Child Jesus, The Oblates of Mary Immaculate, and The City of North Vancouver. The memorial was completed in June 2014. It was vandalized with graffiti in 2020, but the spray paint was removed by volunteers, who also performed a smudging. It was once again vandalized in March 2022, and the Nation announced on March 16 that it would be removed temporarily so Jason Nahanee could repair it.

== See also ==
- St. Thomas Aquinas Regional Secondary School
