= Heber Clifton =

Heber Clifton (1871 – January 1, 1964) was an hereditary chief of the Gitga'ata tribe of the Tsimshian nation of British Columbia, Canada. He was from the Tsimshian community of Hartley Bay, B.C. He was of the Gispwudwada or Killerwhale clan.

As a child he moved to William Duncan's mission at Metlakatla BC, but when many Tsimshian migrated to Metlakatla Alaska in 1887, he was one of a group of families who moved back to their traditional territories and founded the new community of Hartley Bay. He and his wife Lucy were married by Rev. Thomas Crosby in 1891. They had a large family of five sons and four daughters

His leadership abilities were recognized and he became hereditary chief of the village early in the 20th century. He worked all his life in the commercial fishing industry and also worked for Aboriginal rights. He spoke to the McKenna-McBride Commission in 1913 and was one of the founders of the Native Brotherhood of British Columbia.

He recorded some of his oral traditional knowledge with the Tsimshian ethnologist William Beynon, including a version of the story of Gwinaxnuusimgyet.

== Sources ==
- Barbeau, Marius (1950) Totem Poles. 2 vols. (Anthropology Series 30, National Museum of Canada Bulletin 119.) Ottawa: National Museum of Canada.
- Campbell, Kenneth (2005). Persistence and Change, A History of the Ts'msyen Nation. First Nations Education Services, SD 52, Prince Rupert.
- Ancestry.com, British Columbia, Canada, Death Index, 1872-1990 (Ancestry.com Operations Inc), CREA:
