= Guy Williams (politician) =

Canadian politician (1907–1992)

The Honourable Guy R. Williams

Canadian Senator from British Columbia
- In office 1971–1982
- Appointed by: Pierre Trudeau

Personal details
- Born: October 7, 1907 Kitamaat Village, British Columbia, Canada
- Died: December 31, 1992 (aged 85)
- Party: Liberal

Guy R. Williams (October 7, 1907 – December 31, 1992) was a Canadian Senator and Haisla First Nations leader and, for a number of years, was the only Native Canadian in the Senate. He was appointed on December 9, 1971, following the March 31, 1971 retirement of James Gladstone who had been called the first status Indian appointed to the upper house. In fact, Williams appears to be the very first First Nations Senator, because Senator Gladstone was only adopted onto the Blood reserve, and he was ineligible to be on the Indian Register.

== Background ==
Williams was born on a Native reserve of Kitamaat Village, British Columbia, Canada. He worked for a time in a mill before becoming a fisherman and then starting his own boat-building business.

Williams was a member of the Haisla Nation of British Columbia. He was president of the Native Brotherhood of British Columbia for twelve years until his appointment to the Senate.
