= Allied Tribes of British Columbia =

The Allied Tribes of British Columbia (ATBC) was an Indigenous rights organization formed following the First World War. There were 16 tribal groups involved, all focused on the issues of land claims and aboriginal title in British Columbia.

In 1916, the Indian Rights Association and the Interior Tribes of British Columbia united in opposition to the McKenna-McBride Royal Commission (which was tasked with reviewing the size of Indian reserves in the province with an aim to confirming, expanding, or, more typically, reducing them) and formed the Allied Tribes of British Columbia. Many of the nations had met the previous year in Spence's Bridge to support a Nisga'a petition for a treaty, with the support of James Teit. The McKenna-McBridge Royal Commission's report was approved in 1923.

In 1921, the British Judicial Committee of the Privy Council sided with Nigerian Chief Oluwa in his claim for compensation for land around Apapa in Lagos, Nigeria. Inspired by this decision, the Allied Tribes attempted to bring their case for aboriginal title to the Privy Council in London. In 1926, three B.C. Chiefs (including William Pierrish of the Neskonlith Indian Band) travelled to London with a petition for aboriginal title. They were met there by the Canadian High Commission who promised to pass the documents along to King George, but did not.

A meeting was arranged in Ottawa in the spring of 1927 where the claim was dismissed by Duncan Campbell Scott, the Deputy Superintendent-General of Indian Affairs. The Indian Act was then amended to prohibit anyone (aboriginal or otherwise) from soliciting funds for Indian legal claims without a special license from the Superintendent-General. Scott claimed this was necessary to protect Indigenous peoples from lawyers and "agitators". Without any ability to raise funds for their work, the Allied Tribes of British Columbia was dissolved.

One of the leaders of the Allied Tribes of British Columbia was Squamish chief Andrew Paull. In 1931, after the collapse of the Allied Tribes, he organized the Native Brotherhood of British Columbia, which later became the North American Indian Brotherhood.
