= St. Thomas Aquinas Regional Secondary School =

St. Thomas Aquinas Regional Secondary

Location
- 541 West Keith Rd. North Vancouver, British Columbia, V7M 1M5; Canada; 49.3196°N 123.0875°W

Information
- School type: Independent
- Motto: Dirige Me in Veritate Tua ("Direct me in your Truth")
- Religious affiliation: Roman Catholic
- Founded: 1959
- School board: CISVA (Catholic Independent Schools of the Vancouver Archdiocese)
- Superintendent: Mr. Marck Hudon
- Area trustee: Mr. Michael Coyne
- Administrator: Mrs. Linda Sibau
- Principal: Mieszko Krol
- Grades: 8-12
- Enrollment: 650+
- Language: English
- Area: North Vancouver
- Colours: Red, White, and Black
- Team name: Fighting Saints
- Website: www.aquinas.org

St. Thomas Aquinas Regional Secondary is a Catholic school, under the administration of CISVA (Catholic Independent Schools of the Vancouver Archdiocese) school board.

The school is co-educational, offering academic, fine arts, and business programs, as well as athletic, performing arts, and other extracurricular programs, for students from grades 8 to 12.

The school participates in sporting events under the name of the "Fighting Saints".

== History ==
The Sisters of the Child Jesus arrived in British Columbia in 1898 to do missionary work with the First Nations people of the North Shore and built St. Paul’s Indian Residential School. A variety of issues were reported over the years, including reports that the building was a "death-trap" and a "fire trap". The Truth And Reconciliation Commission spoke of rampant sexual, physical and emotional abuse towards the students.

Today there is a memorial statue for all of the students that attended St. Paul's Indian Residential School. In 1957, Archbishop William Mark Duke (also known as Iron Duke) approached the sisters to establish a high school on the North Shore. By 1959 the first students walked through the doors of St. Thomas Aquinas.

== Independent School Status ==
St. Thomas Aquinas Regional Secondary is classified as a Group 1 school under British Columbia's Independent School Act. It receives 50% funding from the Ministry of Education. The school receives no funding for capital costs. It is under charge of the Roman Catholic Archdiocese of Vancouver.

Feeder Parishes
Christ the Redeemer (W. Vancouver)
St. Anthony's (W. Vancouver)
St. Edmund's (N. Vancouver)
Holy Trinity (N. Vancouver)
St. Pius X (N. Vancouver)

== Academic performance ==
St. Thomas Aquinas Regional Secondary is ranked by the Fraser Institute. In 2007, it was ranked 16th out of 298 Vancouver, lower mainland schools.

99% of the students graduate and 75% of graduates enroll at post-secondary institutions immediately after graduation.

Provincial exam averages exceeds provincial norms and are higher than CISVA & Independent school averages.

== Athletic performance ==
All sports teams compete in the North Shore Secondary Schools Athletic Association (NSSSAA) against other secondary schools on the North Shore and Sea to Sky Region.

Both the varsity boys' and girls' basketball teams participate in the BC Catholic Basketball Championship, one of the largest tournaments in British Columbia.

School teams
Soccer
Volleyball
Track and field
Basketball
Cross country
Wrestling
Golf
Field hockey
Gymnastics
Swimming
Rowing

Girls volleyball

- 2009/10 - B.C. Senior Provincial Champions
- 2009/10 - B.C. Catholic Champions
- 2009/10 - Lower Mainland 'AA' Champions
- 2009/10 - B.C. Junior Catholic Champions
- 2009/10 - Junior Girls Vancouver & District Champions
- 2009/10 - Juvenile Girls Vancouver & District Champions
- Ten time Top 10 finish 'AA" Provincial Championships
- Eight Time B.C. Catholic Champions
- Seven Time Juvenile Girls Vancouver & District Champions
- Ten Time Bantam Girls Vancouver & District Champions

Boys soccer

- 2008/09 - 10th Place 'AA' Provincial Championships
- Three Time 'A' Provincial Champions (1998, 2001, 2002)
- 2001/02 - Jr. Boys Vancouver Independent Schools Champions

Wrestling

- 2007/08 - 2nd Place Girls Vancouver & District
- 2007/08 - 2nd Place Jr. Boys & Girls North Shore Finals
- 2007/08 - Okangan Invitational Boys & Girls Champions
- 2005/06 - 5th Place 'AAA' Provincial Championships
- 2004/05 - 2nd Place 'AA' Provincial Championships
- 2003/04 - 2nd Place 'AA' Provincial Championships

Boys basketball

- Four Time 'A' Provincial Champions (1992, 1993, 1994, 2003)
- 1999/2000 - 'AA' Provincial Champions
- Four Time B.C. Catholic Champions
- Three Time Bantam Boys Vancouver & District Champions

Girls basketball

- 2007/08 - North Shore Division One Champions
- 2002, 2003, 2004 North Shore 'AA' Champions
- 1994/95 - BC Catholic Champions

Track and field

- 2004/05 - North Shore Overall Aggregate Champions
- 2004/05 - Junior Boys Vancouver & District Champions
- 2002/03 - North Shore Overall Aggregate Champions
- 2001/02 - Vancouver & District Champions

Golf

- 2005/06 - 7th Place 'AA' Provincial Championships
- 2003/04 - Lower Mainland 'AA' Champions

== Artistic performance ==
St. Thomas Aquinas Regional Secondary provides students with a variety of performing and non-performing arts.

Performing arts	Visual arts
Drama	Art
Band	Photography
Choir	
Music	Yearbook

== Notable alumni ==
- Mike Bernier - Politician
- Noel Callahan - Actor
- David Coles - Musician

== See also ==
- St. Paul’s Indian Residential School
