= List of Squamish villages =

This is a list of Squamish villages. The Squamish people originally lived in the area around Howe Sound, but they moved around 1800 to Burrard Inlet on the invitation of the Tsleil-Waututh who had been depopulated by disease, resulting in overlapping territory with the Musqueam. The lowland and estuary of the Squamish River and other streams at the head of Howe Sound were their main domain before that; their territory and settlement reaches to Green Lake on the far side of today's Resort Municipality of Whistler, beyond which is the country of the Lil'wat. The islands of Howe Sound and the west coast of Howe Sound south to Gibsons are Squamish territory.

The following list is partly based on John R. Swanton's The Indian Tribes of North America, publ. 1953.

== Villages ==
- Átsnach, Burrard Inlet Indian Reserve No.3, North Vancouver
- Chakkai, on the east side of Howe Sound.
- Chalkunts, on Gambier Island.
- Chants, on Burrard Inlet.
- Chechelmen, on Burrard Inlet.
- Ch’ích’elxwi7ḵw (Cheehilkok and Checkilkok in Swanton), at Seymour Creek, Seymour Creek Indian Indian Reserve No. 2; on the Seymour River, North Vancouver
- Chekoalch, on Burrard Inlet.
- Ch’ḵw’elhp, Chekwelp Indian Indian Reserve No. 26, at Gibsons, on the west side of Howe Sound
- Chewas, on the west side of Howe Sound.
- Ch’iyáḵmesh (Chiakamish in Swanton), on the Cheakamus River (Chiakamish Creek in Swanton), a tributary of the Squamish River (Squawmisht River in Swanton), Cheakamus Indian Reserve No. 11; Squamish.
- Chichilek in Swanton, on Burrard Inlet
- Chinmai, on the left bank of the Squamish River.
- Chukchukts, on the left bank of the Squamish River.
- Ekuks, on the right bank of Squawmish River.
- Ustlawn, around Mission Creek on Burrard Inlet (Mission IR. No 1)
- Etleuk, on the right bank of Squawmish River.
- Hastings Sawmill Indians (a large community of Skwxwu7mesh lived at Hastings Mill after it was built).
- Helshen, on Burrard Inlet.
- Xwmélch’tstn (Homulschison in Swanton), on the Capilano River (Capilano Creek in Swanton), Burrard Inlet.
- Huikuayaken, on Howe Sound.
- Humelsom, on Burrard Inlet.
- Ialmuk, at Jericho, Burrard Inlet.
- Ikwopsum, on the left bank of the Squamish River.
- Itliok, on the left bank of the Squamish River.
- Kaayahunik, on the west bank of the Squamish River.
- Kaksine, on the Mamquam River (Mamukum Creek in Swanton), left bank of the Squamish River.
- Kapkapetlp, at Point Grey, Burrard Inlet.
- Kaw̓tín (Kauten in Swanton), on the right bank of the Squamish River, Kowtain Indian Reserve No. 17, Squamish
- Ḵ’íḵ’elx̱en (Kekelun in Swanton), on the west side of Howe Sound at Kaikalahun Indian Reserve No. 25, Port Mellon.
- Kekios, on the right bank of the Squamish River.
- Kekwaiakin, on the left bank of the Squamish River.
- Kelketos, on the east coast of Howe Sound.
- Ketlalsm, on the east side of Howe Sound.
- Kiaken, on the left bank of the Squamish River.
- Kiaken, on Burrard Inlet.
- Kicham, on Burrard Inlet.
- Koalcha, at Lynn Creek (Linn Creek in Swanton), Burrard Inlet.
- Koekoi, on the west side of Howe Sound.
- X̱wáýx̱way (X̱wáy̓x̱way, Qwhy-qwhy, Whoi-Whoi) (Koikoi in Swanton), on Burrard Inlet at Lumberman's Arch, Stanley Park.
- Kolelakom, on Bowen Island, Howe Sound.
- Komps, on the right bank of the Squamish River.
- Kotlskaim, on Burrard Inlet.
- Kuakumchen, on Howe Sound.
- Kukutwom, on the east side of Howe Sound.
- Kulatsen, on the east side of Howe Sound.
- Kulaten, on Burrard Inlet.
- Kwanaken, on the Squamish River.
- Kwichtenem, on the west side of Howe Sound.
- Ḵw’éla7en (Kwolan in Swanton), on the right bank of the Squamish River.
- Male, shared with the Musqueam, north of Sea Island in the delta of the Fraser River.
- Mitlmetlelch, on Passage Island, Howe Sound.
- Nkukapenach, on the right bank of the Squamish River.
- Nkuoosai, on Howe Sound.
- Nkuoukten, on Howe Sound.
- Npapuk, on the east side of Howe Sound.
- Npokwis, on the right bank of the Squamish River.
- Nthaich, on the right bank of the Squamish River.
- Papiak, on Burrard Inlet.
- P’uy̓ám̓ (Poiam in Swanton), on the right bank of the Squamish River, Poyam Indian Reserve No. 9, Squamish
- Puḵway̓úsem (Pokaiosum in Swanton), on the left bank of the Squamish River, Poquiosin Indian Reserve No. 13, Squamish.
- Sauktich, Hat Island, Howe Sound.
- Schilks, on the east side of Howe Sound.
- Schenks (Schink in Swanton), Chekwelp Indian Indian Reserve No. 26, at Gibson's Lodge, on the west side of Howe Sound.
- Selelot, on Burrard Inlet.
- Shemps, on the left bank of the Squamish River.
- Shishaiokoi, on the east coast of Howe Sound.
- Siy̓ích’em (Siechem in Swanton), on the right bank of the Squamish River, Seaichem Indian Reserve No. 16, Squamish.
- Skakaiek, on the right bank of Squamish River.
- Skáwshn (Skauishan in Swanton), on the right bank of the Squamish River, Skowishin Indian Reserve No. 7, Squamish.
- Skeakunts, on Burrard Inlet.
- Skeawatsut, at Point Atkinson (Port Atkinson in Swanton) on the east side of Howe Sound.
- Skelsh, on Burrard Inlet.
- Sklau, on the left bank of the Squamish River.
- Skoachais, on Burrard Inlet.
- Skumin, on the left bank of the Squamish River.
- Skutuksen, on the east side of Howe Sound.
- Skwaius, on Burrard Inlet.
- Slokoi, on the right bank of the Squawmish River.
- Smelakoa, on Burrard Inlet.
- Smok, on the left bank of the Squamish River.
- Sen̓áḵw (Snauk in Swanton), at the mouth of False Creek, Burrard Inlet, Kitsilinao Indian Reserve No. 6, Squamish.
- Spapak, on the right bank of the Squamish River.
- St’á7mes (Stamis in Swanton Stawamus in Wikipedia), on the left bank of the Squamish River.
- Stetuk, on Burrard Inlet.
- Stlaun, on Burrard Inlet.
- Stoktoks, on Howe Sound.
- Stotoii, on the right bank of the Squawmish River.
- Suntz, on Burrard Inlet.
- Sutkel, on Burrard Inlet.
- Swaiwi, on Burrard Inlet.
- Swiat, on the west side of Howe Sound.
- Thetsaken, on the east side of Howe Sound.
- Thetuksem, on the west side of Howe Sound.
- Thetusum, on the west side of Howe Sound.
- Thotais, on the right bank of the Squamish River.
- Tktakal, on the right bank of the Squamish River.
- Tlakom, on Anvil Island in Howe Sound.
- Tlastlemauk, in Burrard Inlet.
- Tleatlum, on Burrard Inlet.
- Toktakamai, on the right bank of the Squamish River.
- Tseklten, on Howe Sound.
- Tsítsusem, at Potlatch Creek, Howe Sound, British Columbia
- Tumtls, on the east side of Howe Sound.
- Ulksen (Ulksin in Swanton), on Burrard Inlet (Ulksen or Ulxn is also the name of the main rise of land between English Bay and the Fraser River, including the heights of the Point Grey peninsula.
- Wíwḵ’em, Waiwaikum Indian Reserve No. 14, Squamish
- Yékw’apsem, Yekwaupsum Indian Reserve No. 18; Squamish.
- Yukuts, on the right bank of Squamish River.

== See also ==
- List of Kwakwaka'wakw villages
- List of Haida villages
- List of Nuxalk villages
