= Joseph McKenna (Canada) =

James Andrew Joseph McKenna is best known for participating in negotiations with a number of indigenous peoples on behalf of the Dominion of Canada, including during the creation of Treaty 8, and Treaty 10.

== Life ==
=== Early and personal life ===
James was born on January 1, 1862, in Charlottetown, Prince Edward Island, to Rose Ann Duffy and James McKenna Sr. As a child he attended St Patrick's School in Charlottetown, and after graduating he attended St Dunstan's College, also in Charlottetown. James worked for the Prince Edward Island Railway, before moving to Ottawa. In Ottawa James married Mary Joanna Josephine Ryan on August 7, 1888, and they had five daughters and two sons.

=== Early government career ===
On March 11, 1886, James started working for the Government of Canada as a third-class clerk in the Privy Council Office in Ottawa. On May 23, 1887, James was assigned to the Department of Indian Affairs, where he became private secretary to the superintendent general, Sir John A. Macdonald. On 1 July 1888 he was promoted to second-class clerk. During this time, he also studied law. His influential position and law background may have contributed to his being selected for later assignments negotiating with indigenous peoples.

In January 1897, superintendent general Clifford Sifton selected James as his private secretary. Later that year, James was sent to negotiate a settlement with the government of British Columbia, in return for the province granting Canada land to build its planned transcontinental railway on. In 1898, James was promoted to first-class clerk.

=== Career negotiating with Indigenous peoples ===
In 1899, James participated under Indian Commissioner David Laird in negotiations on Treaty 8 with indigenous peoples in the District of Athabasca and the northeastern section of British Columbia. James proposed two major changes to the draft document, which was similar to previous treaties. The first proposed change was that indigenous peoples should be given the option of receiving land in severalty (separated portions) as opposed to a unified reserve. The second proposed change was that indigenous peoples receiving annuities from the treaty should receive a lump sum payment instead. Final decisions on the wording of the treaty were made by Sifton, who accepted the first proposal, and rejected the second based on Laird's advice. James then travelled to Fort St John in B.C., as well as Fort Dunvegan, Fort Chipewyan, and Fort McMurray in Alberta, to negotiate with local indigenous bands for their agreement to the treaty. Negotiations were described as tense at times.

Metis individuals within the territory that was negotiated over as part of Treaty 8 were not granted land, instead they were granted scrips. Applications for scrips were processed in parallel with Treaty 8 negotiations, but continued for years afterwards. On March 2, 1900, two commissions were created to handle scrips concerning Treaty 8, and James was named co-commissioner for the Districts of Assiniboia and Alberta, along with Major James Walker. The two were given one year to process scrip applications, but were not able to finish on time. On March 16, 1901, Walker was reassigned and McKenna was appointed sole commissioner. He would continue the work of processing Treaty 8 scrips until 1904.

On July 1, 1901 James was promoted to "Assistant Indian Commissioner and Chief Inspector of Agencies" for the regions of Manitoba and the North-West Territories, and relocated to Winnipeg, Manitoba. While in this role McKenna was known to support the incumbent policies of residential schooling, as well as measures taken to suppress traditional indigenous dances and attire, especially off-reserve.

Alberta and Saskatchewan achieved provincial status in 1905, at which point the Canadian government began negotiations on Treaty 10, which was meant to cover some indigenous groups in those provinces that were not involved in previous treaties. McKenna was appointed commissioner for the treaty as well as for scrip payments, and he left Winnipeg in August 1906 to begin that work. He left before the work could be completed, and it was finished by a local co-worker.

In February 1909, the Department of Indian Affairs closed the Winnipeg Indian Commission office, and demoted McKenna to "Inspector of Roman Catholic Schools" for Manitoba, Alberta, and Saskatchewan. Some residential schools would have fallen under his jurisdiction in this capacity. He retained his salary of $2,600 yearly, which made him the best-paid Department of Indian Affairs officer in the region at the time. His new work took him on inspection tours of Catholic boarding and industrial schools from Fort Frances, Ontario, to St Albert, Alberta.

On May 24, 1912, James was reassigned to become the Dominion of Canada's representative in negotiations with British Columbia regarding a number of grievances lodged by indigenous peoples. He reached an agreement with Premier Richard McBride that became known as the McKenna–McBride agreement. It created a royal commission with representatives of both governments to examine reserves and adjust their size, with the consent of indigenous peoples. In return, British Columbia would abandon its policy of “reversionary interest,” which stated that any land removed from a reserve within B.C. would become property of the provincial government. McBride allegedly refused to consider "aboriginal title or native franchise" within the scope of the commission, and McKenna reportedly agreed without complaint.

On March 31, 1913, the Royal Commission on Indian Affairs for the Province of British Columbia was created. McKenna was one of the representatives for the Dominion of Canada, and he relocated to Victoria with his family for this work. The commissioners spent three years travelling across B.C., gathering testimonial from indigenous peoples as well as non-indigenous peoples, about the adequacy, size, and borders, of the province's reserves. At this time James reported to Duncan Campbell Scott, the deputy superintendent general of the Department of Indian Affairs. James reportedly requested a salary increase of $1,400 yearly from Scott, as well as a job in Victoria, neither of which Scott committed to. On June 30, 1916, the commission concluded its work, and recommended a number of changes to the borders of reserves in the province. Overall, the commission recommended doubling the total size of B.C. reserves, and reducing the value of the land they occupied by around 66%.

After the commission disbanded, Scott assigned McKenna to a supervisory position in Victoria, where he was to ensure the timely printing of the commission's report, and to secure British Columbia's acceptance of it. There were delays in printing, allegedly as a result of disorganized handling of the original document. In addition, the provincial government led by William John Bowser refused to act on the report, reportedly wishing to focus on an upcoming election. The victory of the Liberal Party of B.C. under Harlan Carey Brewster in 1916 caused further delays after the new government made new demands, including that a clause requiring indigenous consent to any reserve border changes be removed. In 1923, after that clause was removed, the report was accepted by all participating parties. After the report was accepted, negotiations between the province, the dominion, and indigenous groups, still had to take place before any border changes were made.

On April 1, 1917, James was fired by Scott for unspecified "unfortunate habits". Scott alleged that McKenna's habits had caused him to spend the entirety of his personal salary, and stated that McKenna's firing had been delayed out of concerns that he would no longer be able to support his large family.

=== Writing career ===
James A.J. McKenna wrote an article for Catholic World entitled: “Are Canadian Catholics priest-ridden?", which appeared in issue 52, January 1891, pages 541–545. He also wrote a propaganda piece for the Canadian Government entitled The Hudson's Bay route: a compilation of facts with conclusions, which argued for a railway route to Hudson's Bay.

James appears in Henry James Morgan's book Canadian men and women of the time, which credits him with an 1895 pamphlet entitled Sir John Thompson: a study. However, no record of this pamphlet remains.

In February 1918, James published a series of articles in British Columbia newspapers where he argued that the dominion should return lands to B.C. that were ceded in order to build the transcontinental railway. In return, the province should give up its claim to lands removed from reserves as part of the recommendations of the McKenna–McBride Royal Commission. This was less than a year after his firing, and the interference in his former work reportedly annoyed his former boss, Duncan Scott.

=== Honorifics ===
In 1911, James was granted an honorary Doctorate of Law by the University of Ottawa.

=== Retirement and death ===
McKenna retired to Victoria, where he died of heart failure on May 30, 1919.
