= McKenna–McBride Royal Commission =

Royal Commission on Indian Affairs for the Province of British Columbia
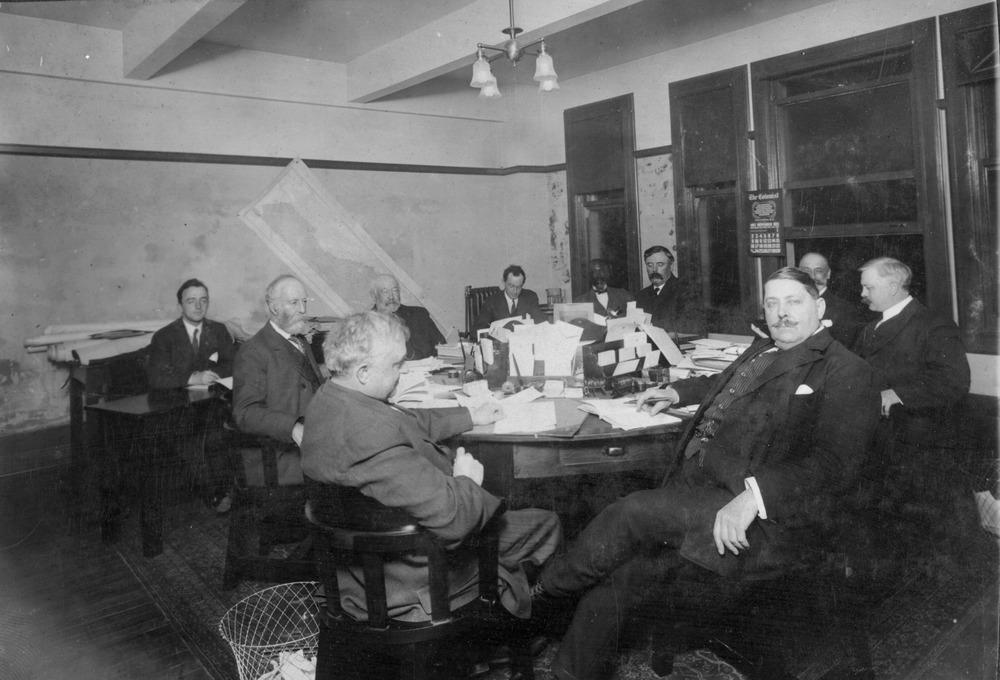
- The commission in session in Victoria BC, circa 1913
- Date: 1913-1916
- Location: British Columbia
- Also known as: McKenna–McBride Commission
- Chair: Nathaniel Whitworth White
- Report: Report of the Royal Commission of Indian Affairs

The Royal Commission on Indian Affairs for the Province of British Columbia (commonly known as the McKenna–McBride Commission) (Note: Originally titled the Commission Respecting Indian Lands and Indian Affairs Generally in the province of British Columbia) was a joint federal and provincial royal commission established in 1912 to resolve the "Indian reserve question" or "Indian land question" in British Columbia.

It is referred to as the McKenna–McBride Commission after the two men who signed the agreement that created it in 1912: federal commissioner Joseph McKenna and BC Premier Richard McBride. The commission was chaired by Nathaniel Whitworth White, and, along with McKenna, included the following commissioners: James Andrew, Edward Ludlow Wetmore, Samurez Carmichael, James Pearson Shaw, and Day Hort MacDowall. The commissioners travelled throughout the province for 3 years gathering evidence from Indigenous and non-Indigenous people on the adequacy of reserves.

On July 19, 1924, an amended McKenna–McBride Commission was adopted and applied as the B.C. Indian Lands Settlement Act.

The McKenna-McBride Commission had a significant impact on Aboriginal reserve lands by adding to, reducing, and eliminating reserves throughout the province. In total, reserve land was removed in 35 places from 23 Bands.

== History ==
=== Background ===
With encroachment on their traditional territories, First Nations in British Columbia continued to fight for a fair settlement of their land and title rights. In an attempt to conclusively resolve the so-called "Indian Question", the Royal Commission on Indian Affairs was established as a joint federal and provincial commission.

The primary goal of the commission was "to adjust the acreage of Indian reserves in British Columbia." The governments believed that if additional reserves were set aside for them, First Nations bands would be satisfied.

=== Development ===
The commissioners travelled throughout the province for 3 years gathering evidence from Indigenous and non-Indigenous people on the adequacy of reserves. They visited nearly every band, asking them what little pieces of their traditional territories would they like included as reserves.

The Commission held hearings throughout the province from 1913 to June 1916, when it finished its work. In addition to adding reserves to most bands, it also removed land from previous reserves. These were usually in prime locations near urban settlements, and are known as "cut-off lands." The Commission recommended the removal of approximately 47,000 acres (190 km^{2}) of land (with an assessed value between CA$1,347,912.72 and $1,533,704.72) from 54 reserves, and the addition of about 87,000 acres (350 km^{2}) of land (with an assessed value of only $444,838.80). So, while the area of the added reserve lands was nearly double that of that withdrawn, the value of the land added was only about one-third the contemporary valuation of the land taken away.

The implementation of the report did not begin until 1923. On July 19, 1924, an amended McKenna–McBride Commission was adopted and applied as the B.C. Indian Lands Settlement Act.

== Testimonies ==
Various Indigenous tribes provided testimony at Commission hearings. Among others, these tribes include:

- Spallumcheen Indian Band, on their reserve at Enderby (2 October 1913)
- Scowlitz First Nation, at New Westminster (4 September 1914)
- Too-sey First Nation (Chilcotin), at the Too-sey Reserve (21 July 1914)
- Pemberton First Nation, at Pemberton Meadows (15 August 1915)
- Cowtain First Nation, at Cheakamus (17 August 1916)
