= Native Brotherhood of British Columbia =

Organization

- Logo of the Native Brotherhood of British Columbia
- Abbreviation: NBBC
- Formation: December 13, 1931; 94 years ago
- Founder: Alfred Adams; William Beynon; William Jeffrey; Heber Clifton
- Founded at: Port Simpson, British Columbia, Canada
- Type: Nonprofit
- Region served: British Columbia
- Subsidiaries: Native Fishing Association
- Secessions: North American Indian Brotherhood
- Website: nativebrotherhood.ca

The Native Brotherhood of British Columbia (NBBC or the Brotherhood) is a provincial First Nations advocacy organization founded in 1931, with the primary goal of addressing and improving the socioeconomic conditions of First Nations in British Columbia. Initially, the organization focused on economic issues, particularly in response to the detrimental effects of the Great Depression on coastal First Nations, especially those involved in the fishing industry. The Brotherhood's early membership was predominantly made up of communities from the northern coast, notably the Haida and Tsimshian.

In the years following the Second World War, the Brotherhood expanded both geographically and in scope. Its membership grew to include communities further south and into the interior of the province. As the organization's influence grew, so too did its mandate, which began to address broader social issues such as education, housing, and the fight against discriminatory policies. By this time, the Brotherhood had emerged as one of Canada's leading Indigenous organizations, playing a pivotal role in advocating for the rights and welfare of First Nations communities. As of 2025, the Brotherhood remains one of Canada's oldest active Indigenous organizations.

== History ==
=== Founding ===
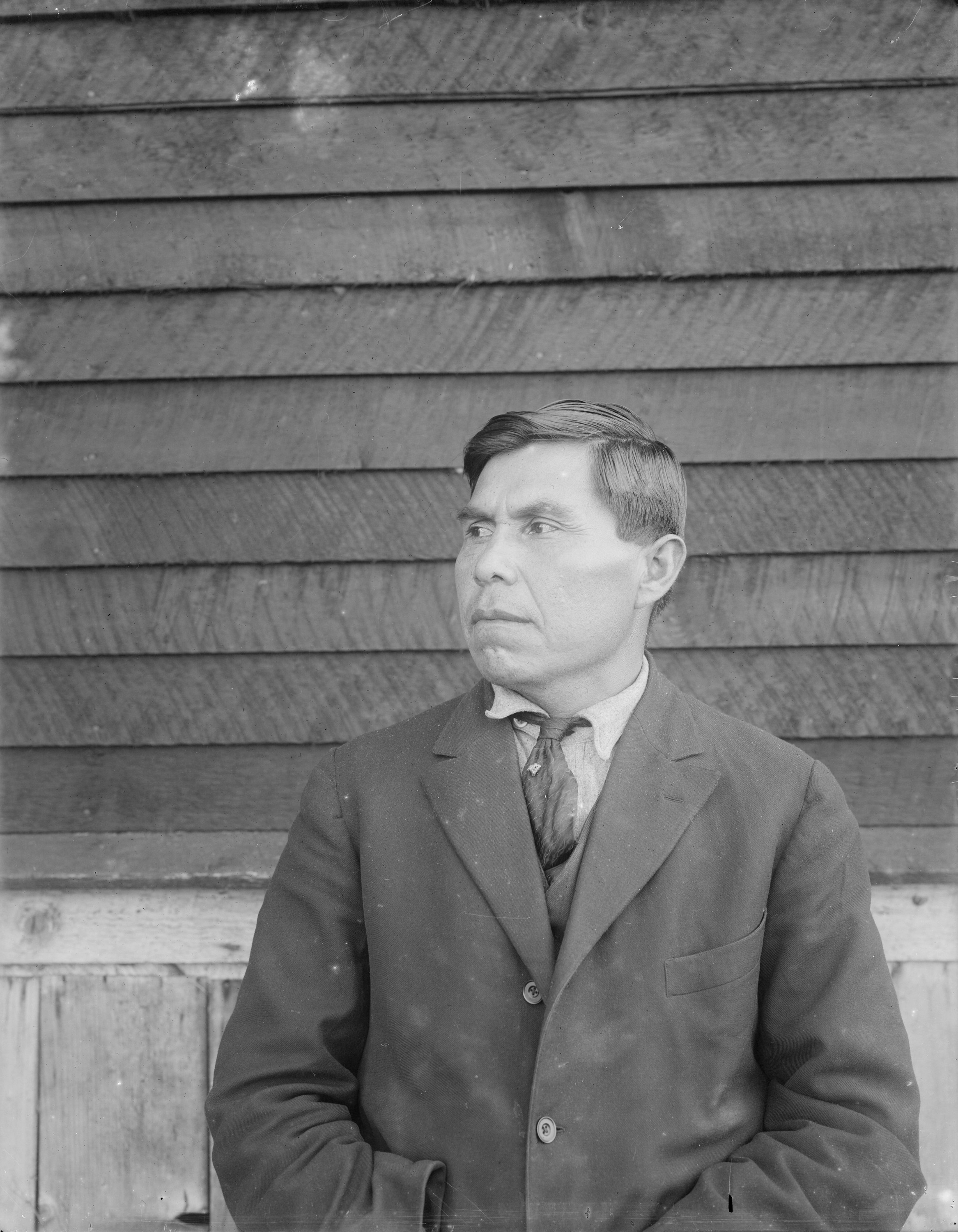
1919 portrait of Alfred Adams, one of the founders of the NBBC

In the summer of 1931, Massett Haida leader Alfred Adams (Haida: Skil Gyaa.ans, lit. 'Standing Property') met with several Tsimshian and Haida fishermen who were waiting out a storm on Langara Island, in Haida Gwaii. Adams had become familiar with the Alaska Native Brotherhood during one of his many visits to Alaska, where he had family. He suggested forming a similar inter-tribal organization to those present, though with a focus on the economic issues being faced by First Nations fishermen in the wake of the Great Depression. The initial meeting led to further communication between Adams and Tsimshian leaders during the fall, and led to the organization of the first meeting.

The first meeting of the Brotherhood was held on December 13, 1931 at the Salvation Army hall in Lax Kw'alaams. It began with a rendition of Onward, Christian Soldiers, followed by a full day of speeches, including one by Adams which highlighted the importance of unity. The following days involved the drafting of a petition to send to Ottawa, and the establishment of the organization based on European fraternal orders. It was attended by representatives from six communities: Gitga'at, Gitxaala, Kitselas, Metlakatla, Massett, and Lax Kw'alaams. Alfred Adams, William Beynon, Chief William Jeffrey and Guy Williams were among its founding members.

The new organization demanded improved working conditions for First Nations fishermen, in addition to better education, hunting, fishing, and trapping rights, and timber harvesting on off-reserve lands. These claims were nearly identical to the demands of the defunct Allied Tribes of British Columbia, but avoided explicitly mentioning land-claims, which were prohibited.

The following years saw a gradual expansion of the Brotherhood to other communities. By 1936, community membership included Kitasoo, Heiltsuk, Nuxalk, Haisla, Kispiox, Gitwangak, Gitsegukla, and Gitanmaax.

=== Second World War ===
Policies implemented by the federal government in response to the outbreak of the Second World War, namely conscription and the decision to start imposing income tax on First Nations commercial fishermen, increased the Brotherhood's membership. In 1942, Brotherhood merged with Pacific Coast Native Fishermen's Organization and its primarily Kwakwaka'wakw membership which reoriented it towards fishing rights. That same year, the Nisga'a also joined the organization, in part because of Frank Calder's friendship with Alfred Adams' son.

In 1945, Andy Paull, then business manager for the Brotherhood, left the organization after allegations of financial mismanagement. Subsequently, chapters centred in Coast Salish communities split off to form the North American Indian Brotherhood.

=== Special Joint Committee and The Native Voice ===
In 1946, the Brotherhood established its own newspaper, The Native Voice, at the request of then late-president Alfred Adams, and edited by Maisie Hurley. It became the official organ of the Brotherhood, and was the only Indigenous newspaper in the province at the time.

In 1947, the Brotherhood sent delegates to Ottawa to participate in a special joint committee of the Senate and House of Commons, which was tasked with re-evaluating the Indian Act. After first hearing the testimony of government and church officials in 1946, the Brotherhood's delegation was invited to provide testimony in May 1947. The delegation consisted of then president William Scow, Rev. Peter Kelly, Thomas Gosnell and Guy R. Williams. They called for an end to governmental paternalism, arguing that First Nations had the capacity to be more independent, and criticized the continued imposition of taxation on First Nations without representation. The contributions of the Brotherhood contributed substantially to the 1951 revision of the Indian Act.

In 1985, the NBBC formed the Native Fishing Association, whose purpose was to improved First Nation's involvement in the commercial fishing industry through low interest loans and training programs.

=== Presidents ===
Term	President	Source
1932–1945	Alfred Adams	
1945–1954	William Scow	
1954–1960	Robert Clifton	
1960–1972	Guy Williams	
c. 1974–1977	John Clifton	
1977–1988	Edwin Newman	

== Legacy ==
The formation of the Brotherhood in BC is recounted in North Vancouver filmmaker Marie Clements' 2017 musical documentary The Road Forward.

== Bibliography ==
- Drucker, Philip (1958). The Native Brotherhoods: Modern Intertribal Organizations on the Northwest Coast. Washington, D.C.: United States Government Printing Office. OCLC 298024002. OL 6264765M – via Internet Archive.
- Jamieson, Eric (2016). The native voice : the history of Canada's first Aboriginal newspaper and its founder Maisie Hurley. Halfmoon Bay, BC: Caitlin Press. ISBN 9781987915174. OCLC 932093535 – via Internet Archive.
- O’Donnell, Jacqueline Patricia (1985). The Native Brotherhood of British Columbia 1931-1950 : a new phase in native political organization (MA thesis). Vancouver: University of British Columbia. doi:10.14288/1.0096506.
- Parker, Peter (1992). "We are not beggars" : political genesis of the Native Brotherhood, 1931-1951 (MA thesis). Simon Fraser University.
- Tennant, Paul (1982). "Native Indian Political Organization in British Columbia, 1900-1969: A Response to Internal Colonialism". BC Studies (55): 3–49. doi:10.14288/bcs.v0i55.1132 – via Open Journal Systems.
- Tennant, Paul (1990). Aboriginal Peoples and Politics : The Indian Land Question in British Columbia, 1849-1989. Vancouver: UBC Press. ISBN 978-0-7748-5478-8.
