= Cheakamus, British Columbia =

Community of Indigenous Squamish people

Cheakamus
- Community
- Interactive map of Cheakamus
- Coordinates: 49°49′59″N 123°9′4″W
- Country: Canada
- Province: British Columbia
- District: New Westminster Land District
- First Nation: Squamish Nation
- Time zone: UTC−08:00 (PST)
  - Summer (DST): UTC−07:00 (PDT)
- Area code(s): 604, 778, 236, 672
- GNBC code: JAIZF

Cheakamus is a community of the Indigenous Squamish people, located near Squamish, British Columbia. The name of the Cheakamus River comes from the name of this community, which is located with the Cheakamus 11 reserve. Chiyakamesh translates into People of the Fish Weir. A chiyak is a special fish weir this community used on the Cheakamus River to catch salmon. It is the largest reserve of the Squamish Nation in size.

The 2005 CN Rail Cheakamus River derailment caused severe environmental damage to the Cheakamus River system and affected downstream communities and Indigenous resource users, impacting this community.

== See also ==
- List of Aboriginal communities in Canada
- List of Squamish villages
