= Andy Paull =

Squamish leader (1892–1959)

Andrew Paull
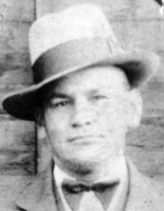
- Paull in 1929
- Born: February 6, 1892; North Vancouver, British Columbia, Canada
- Died: July 28, 1959 (aged 67); North Vancouver, British Columbia, Canada
- Burial place: Squamish First Nation Cemetery
- Other names: Xwechtáal
- Occupation: Leader ● activist ● coach ● lawyer
- Spouse: Josephine Paull (m. 1914)
- Parents: Theresa Paull; Dan Paull

Andy Paull, (Andrew Paull, Xwechtáal, Xwupúkinem, Qoitchetahl) (February 6, 1892 – July 28, 1959) was a Squamish leader, activist, coach, and lawyer.

== Early life and family ==
Born to Dan Paull and Theresa Paull (née Lacket-Joe) of a prominent family, and was known to have a particularly close relationship with his maternal grandmother. It was his grandmother that gave him the name Xwechtáal ("the Serpent Slayer"), passed down from a legendary ancestor. His maternal grandfather was known as "Hundred Dollar Charlie," who reportedly gave the last potlatch on Burrard Inlet before it was banned by the Canadian government in 1885. Paull was raised in the village of Stawamus, near Squamish, British Columbia, but later his family moved to the village of Eslha7an in North Vancouver, British Columbia where he began to attend St. Paul's Indian Residential School when it first opened in 1899. Paull was chosen by a mass meeting of Squamish people to "learn the ways of the white man and to speak for the Indian." After six years at residential school, Paull spent two years learning from local Sḵwxwú7mesh chiefs. Paull's time at residential school was clearly important to him as he maintained a close relationship with a number of the oblates and nuns for his entire life. Nevertheless, he held his Sḵwxwú7mesh "education" to be at least equally important:

It was the duty of the more responsible Indians to see that the history and traditions of our race were properly handed down to posterity. A knowledge of our history and legends was similar as an education is regarded among whitemen. Those who possessed it were regarded as aristocrats. Those were indifferent, whether adults or children, were rascals. Being without means of transmitting it into writing, much time was spent by the aristocrats in importing this knowledge to the youth. It was the responsible duty of responsible elders.

In 1907, he began on-the-job training with the law offices of Hugh St. Quentin Cayley, and spent four years there learning the practice of law. He never became a professional lawyer, as he would have to become "enfranchised" (and give up his Indian status) to join the bar association. He worked instead as a longshoreman, as secretary to Chief Harry of Eslha7an.

== Activism ==
Paull eventually moved on to organizing in political struggles on behalf of his people, and indigenous peoples across the country. In 1927 he testified before a special joint committee in Ottawa as an executive and secretary of the Allied Tribes of British Columbia. Paull had demanded adequate additional lands, full title to all foreshores of Indigenous reserves including fishing, hunting and water rights. However, it had been claimed by the British Columbia government that the aforementioned lands belonged to themselves by right of conquest. After the Canadian federal government made it illegal for indigenous peoples in the country to organize funds for land claims issues, the Allied Tribes of BC quickly dissolved. At home he organized bands, orchestras, athletic teams and labor groups. In 1942 he became the business manager for the Native Brotherhood of British Columbia, but in 1945 he split with the organization and formed the North American Indian Brotherhood. He spoke against enfranchisement for Aboriginals saying, "You would be merely selling your birthright for the doubtful privilege of putting a cross on a ballot every four years." A number of issues he fought for were Aboriginal rights and title, education, potlatching, and political organizing.
