= Ustlawn =

Canadian Indian reserve

Coordinates: 49°19′00″N 123°06′00″W

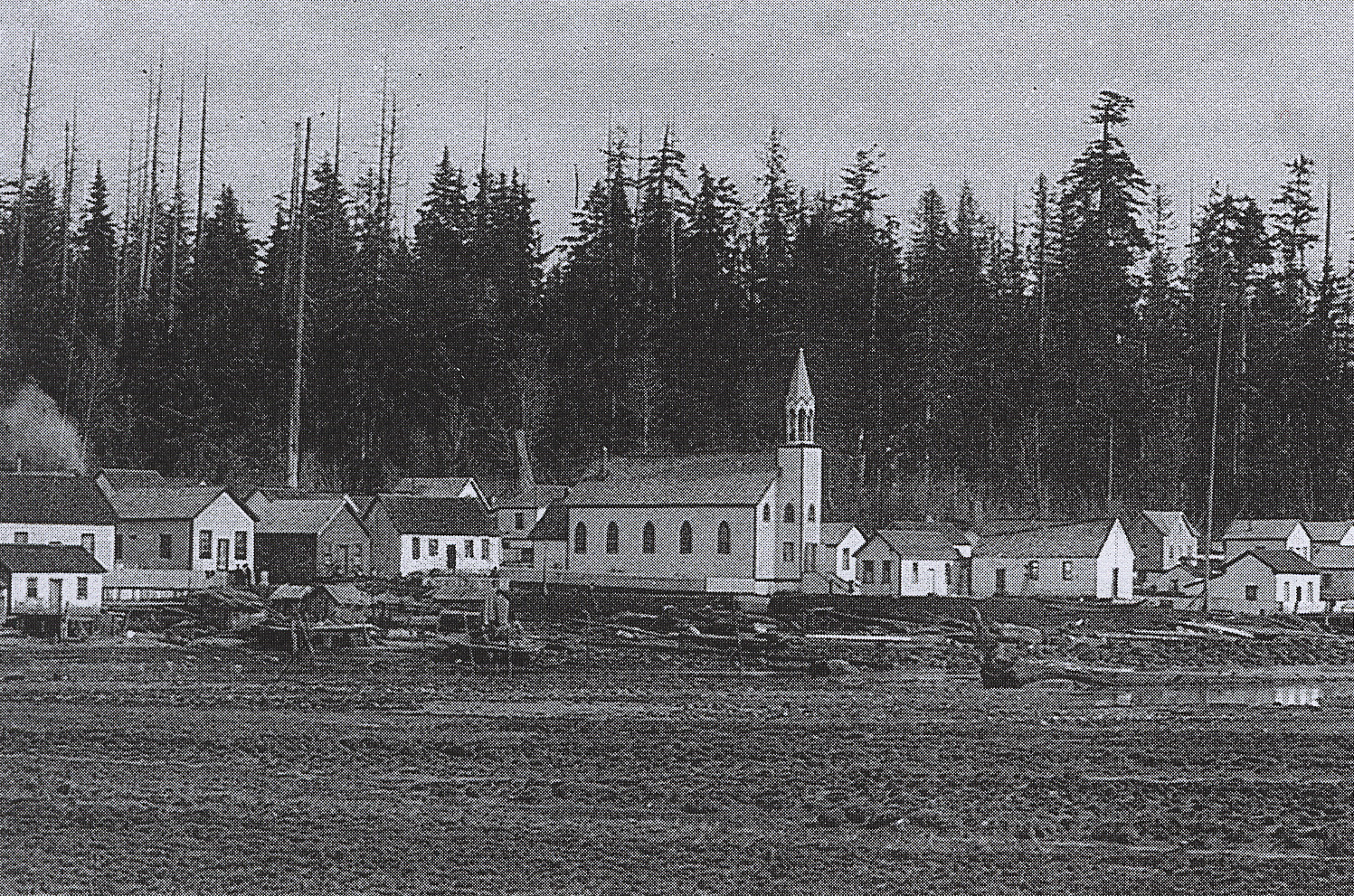
The village of Eslha7an, also called Mission Reserve and Mission Creek Reserve after the Indian reserve it is located on, was the center of religious conversion for these people. Photographed here is the St. Paul's Catholic Church, a National Historic Site of Canada.

Ustlawn (Squamish language: Eslhá7an) is a Squamish village community located on the shores of North Vancouver. The Squamish name Eslhá7an translates as head bay, denoted what used to be the furthest out reaching bay enclave in the Burrard Inlet. Its origin as a primary village goes back to the earliest missionaries in British Columbia with the St. Paul's Catholic Church being the oldest extant mission church in the Vancouver area and a National Historic Site of Canada. It is also home to the Eslha7an Training Center, the Stitsma Employment Center, and the So-Sah-Latch Health and Family Centre. On the shores of the village is the Mosquito Creek Marina. The official name of the Indian reserve it is situated on is Mission Indian Reserve No. 1.

== See also ==
- List of Squamish villages

== Bibliography ==
- Barman, Jean (2007) [2005]. Stanley Park's Secret: The Forgotten Families of Whoi Whoi, Kanaka Ranch and Brockton Point. Madeira Park, BC: Harbour Publishing. ISBN 978-1-55017-420-5.
