= City limits (disambiguation) =

City limits are the defined boundaries of a city.

City Limits may also refer to:

== Film and television ==
- City Limits (1934 film), an American romantic comedy
- City Limits (1985 film), an American post-apocalyptic action film
- City Limits (2004 film), an Italian crime film
- City Limits (TV series), a 1983–1995 Canadian music magazine series

== Magazines ==
- City Limits (London magazine), an events and arts magazine 1981–1993
- City Limits (New York magazine), an investigative journalism magazine founded in 1976

== Music ==
- City Limits, a 1961 album by the Wilburn Brothers
- City Limits, a 2009–2011 series of albums by Silkie
- City Limit, a 1980 album by Billy Ocean

== Other uses ==
- City Limits (painting), a 1969 painting by Phillip Guston
- City Limits Barbeque, restaurant in Columbia, South Carolina
