= FAMM =

FAMM may refer to:

- Families Against Mandatory Minimums, an American nonprofit advocacy organization founded in 1991 to challenge mandatory sentencing laws
- Federación de Artes Marciales Mixtas Equidad y Juego Limpio (Federation of Mixed Martial Arts Equity and Fair Play), the governing body for mixed martial arts in Mexico
- Female Artists of Mougins Museum, a private art museum located in Mougins, Provence, France
- Mahikeng Airport, an airport serving Mahikeng and Mmabatho, South Africa, ICAO airport code FAMM
