= Joan Snyder =

American painter (born 1940)

- Born: April 16, 1940 (age 86); Highland Park, New Jersey
- Education: Douglass College, Rutgers University
- Known for: Painting
- Spouse: Margaret "Maggie" Cammer
- Awards: MacArthur Fellow; Guggenheim Fellow; National Endowment for the Arts Fellow; Arts & Letters Award in Art Recipient

Joan Snyder (born April 16, 1940) is an American painter from New York. She is a MacArthur Fellow, a Guggenheim Fellow, a National Endowment for the Arts Fellow, and an elected member of American Academy of Arts and Letters.

Snyder first gained public attention in the early 1970s with her "stroke paintings," which used a grid to deconstruct and retell the story of abstract painting. By the late seventies, Snyder had abandoned the formality of using a background grid. She began more explicitly incorporating symbols and text, as the paintings took on a more complex materiality. These early works were included in the 1973 and 1981 Whitney Biennials and the 1975 Corcoran Biennial.

Snyder's paintings are narratives of both personal and communal experiences. Through an individual approach and persistent experimentation with technique and materials, Snyder has extended the expressive potential of abstract painting.

== Early life and education ==
Joan Snyder was born on April 16, 1940, in Highland Park, New Jersey. She received her BA in Sociology, from Douglass College in 1962 and her MFA from Rutgers University in 1966.

== Work ==
While living on a New Jersey farm in 1962, Snyder worked in a studio on the Raritan River in New Brunswick, creating some of her earliest paintings of farm and landscape scenes, as well as expressionist portraits. In the mid to late 60's she was working explicitly with the idea of female sensibility, using materials in her paintings such as lentil seeds, flocking, thread, glitter and gauze. Snyder describes her processes involving non-art materials as a type of ritual act for the painting. Snyder's ideas often take form in her paintings through other means other than paint such as music, poetry and words to further push the intent of her pieces. These works eventually led to Snyder's seminal stroke paintings in the late 60's and early '70's. Snyder worked alongside artists such as Mary Heilmann, Jennifer Bartlett and Harriet Korman during the 1960s, all of whom were attempting to bring more process into their art making.

== Stroke paintings ==
Creek Square (1974) at the National Gallery of Art in 2022, an example of the artist's stroke paintings.

In the early 1970s, Snyder began to explore paint as subject, reconstructing abstract painting through gestural strokes on canvas over a gridded background. These paintings, more commonly known as her 'stroke' paintings, were included in the 1973 and 1981 Whitney Biennials as well as the Corcoran Biennial in 1975.

Following the stroke paintings in the mid 70s, Snyder's work once again revisited female sensibility and the work more vigorously explored materiality. By the late 70s she abandoned the formality of the grid and began to more explicitly incorporate symbols and text in her paintings.

== The feminist movement ==
In 1971, Snyder founded the Mary H. Dana Women Artist Series, "the oldest continuous running exhibition space in the United States dedicated to making visible the work of emerging and established contemporary women artists."

She was a founding member of Heresies, a Feminist Publication On Art and Politics, alongside artists and critics including Ida Applebroog, Joyce Kozloff, Lucy Lippard, Nina Yankowitz, Joan Braderman, Sue Heinemann and Miriam Schapiro.

== Awards ==
Snyder is the recipient of a 1974 National Endowment for the Arts Fellowship, a 1983 John Simon Guggenheim Memorial Fellowship, a 2007 MacArthur Fellowship, and a 2026 elected member of the American Academy of Arts & Letters.

== Personal life ==
In 1969, Snyder married photographer Larry Fink. She gave birth to their daughter, Molly, in 1979. They were divorced in 1985.

== Collections ==
Snyder's work is in;

- Art Institute of Chicago, Chicago, IL
- Brooklyn Museum, Brooklyn, NY
- FAMM (Femmes Artistes Musée de Mougins), Mougins, France
- Dallas Museum of Art, Dallas, TX
- Guggenheim Museum, New York, NY
- Harvard Art Museums, Cambridge, MA
- High Museum of Art, Atlanta, GA
- The Jewish Museum, New York, NY
- The Metropolitan Museum of Art, New York, NY
- Mount Holyoke College Art Museum, South Hadley, MA
- Museum of Fine Arts, Boston, MA
- The Museum of Modern Art, New York, NY
- National Gallery of Art, Washington, DC
- National Museum of Women in the Arts, Washington, DC
- Neuberger Museum, State University of New York at Purchase, NY
- The Phillips Collection, Washington, DC
- Rose Art Museum, Brandeis University, Waltham MA
- San Francisco Museum of Modern Art, San Francisco, CA
- Smith College Museum of Art, Northampton, MA
- Speed Art Museum, Louisville, KY
- Tang Museum, Skidmore College, Saratoga Springs, NY
- Tate Modern, London, England
- University of Arizona Museum of Art, Tucson, AZ
- Virginia Museum of Fine Arts, Richmond, VA
- Whitney Museum of American Art, New York, NY
- Wichita Art Museum, Wichita, KS
- Zimmerli Art Museum, Rutgers University, New Brunswick, NJ
