= 2009 in Ultimate Warrior Challenge Mexico =

Information
- First date: February 28, 2009
- Last date: November 28, 2009

Events
- Total events: 4

Fights
- Total fights: 43
- Title fights: 5

The year 2009 was the first year in the history of Ultimate Warrior Challenge Mexico, a mixed martial arts promotion based in Mexico. In these year, UWC held 4 events.

== Events list ==
#	Event	Date	Venue	Location
1	UWC Mexico 1: Baja California vs. California	February 28, 2009	Auditorio Fausto Gutiérrez Moreno	Tijuana, Mexico
2	UWC Mexico 2: Furia Cachanilla	May 30, 2009	Auditorio Fausto Gutiérrez Moreno	Tijuana, Mexico
3	UWC Mexico 3: Tijuana vs. Brazil	July 18, 2009	Auditorio Fausto Gutiérrez Moreno	Tijuana, Mexico
4	UWC Mexico 4: Renacimiento	November 28, 2009	Auditorio Fausto Gutiérrez Moreno	Tijuana, Mexico

== UWC Mexico 1: Baja California vs. California ==
UWC Mexico 1: Baja California vs. California
- Promotion: Ultimate Warrior Challenge Mexico
- Date: February 28, 2009
- Venue: Auditorio Fausto Gutiérrez Moreno
- City: Tijuana, Mexico

Event chronology
UWC Mexico 1: Baja California vs. California	UWC Mexico 2: Furia Cachanilla

UWC Mexico 1: Baja California vs. California was an inaugural mixed martial arts event held by Ultimate Warrior Challenge Mexico on February 28, 2009, at Auditorio Fausto Gutiérrez Moreno in Tijuana, Mexico.

=== Background ===
In late 2000s, the UWC was launched with the goal of popularizing Mexican MMA, which at the time had limited coverage, as most Mexican fans preferred events from Pride FC and UFC, the two leading promotions of the era. A heavyweight fight between Miguel Pardinas (from Tijuana) and Juan Carlos Sánchez (from Ensenada) was announced as the main event.

=== Results ===
Main card
Weight class				Method	Round	Time	Notes
Heavyweight	Miguel Pardinas	def.	Juan Carlos Sánchez	TKO (punches)	1	2:36
Lightweight	David Mariscal	def.	Mike Rebello	Decision (unanimous)	3	5:00
Heavyweight	Mario Muñoz	def.	Cody Goodale	Decision (unanimous)	3	5:00
Middleweight	Jesús Sánchez	def.	Tony Gianopolous Jr.	Submission (armbar)	1	0:50
Lightweight	Gabriel Benítez	def.	Kyle Olsen	Submission (guillotine choke)	1	1:25
Welterweight	Fabian Quintanar	def.	Gilbert Salinas	Decision (majority)	3	5:00
Lightweight	Travis Yonkers	def.	Ismael Leon	Submission (armbar)	1	0:42
Lightweight	Manuel Ramos Gallareta	def.	Mike Tseng	TKO (punches)	1	1:30
Lightweight	Eduardo Espinoza	def.	Alex Amora	Submission (rear-naked choke)	1	1:38
Bantamweight	Brady Harrison	def.	Luis García	TKO (punches)	1	2:43

== UWC Mexico 2: Furia Cachanilla ==
UWC Mexico 2: Furia Cachanilla
- Promotion: Ultimate Warrior Challenge Mexico
- Date: May 30, 2009
- Venue: Auditorio Fausto Gutiérrez Moreno
- City: Tijuana, Mexico

Event chronology
UWC Mexico 1: Baja California vs. California	UWC Mexico 2: Furia Cachanilla	UWC Mexico 3: Tijuana vs. Brazil

UWC Mexico 2: Furia Cachanilla was a mixed martial arts event held by Ultimate Warrior Challenge Mexico on May 30, 2009, at the Auditorio Fausto Gutiérrez Moreno in Tijuana, Mexico.

=== Background ===
At UWC Mexico 2, the inaugural UWC champion was revealed in a welterweight bout between Akbarh Arreola and Adam Lehman in the main event.

A strawweight fight between Margarita de la Cruz and Christina Marks was announced, marking the first sanctioned female MMA bout in the country.

=== Results ===
Main card
Weight class				Method	Round	Time	Notes
Welterweight	Akbarh Arreola	def.	Adam Lehman	Submission (triangle choke)	1	0:49	(Note: For the UWC Welterweight Championship)
Light Heavyweight	Delon Williams	def.	Sergio Villaruel	TKO (punches)	1	2:59
Middleweight	Jesús Sánchez	def.	Michael Pratt	TKO (punches)	1	4:58
Lightweight	Gabriel Benítez	def.	Shawn Major	TKO (doctor stoppage)	1	2:13
Featherweight	Margarita de la Cruz	def.	Christina Marks	Submission (triangle choke)	1	2:30
Lightweight	Henry Briones	def.	Hildred Oliney	Submission (triangle choke)	1	4:18
Lightweight	Fabián Quintanar	def.	Michael Asaro	Submission (triangle choke)	1	3:17
Lightweight	Eduardo Espinoza	def.	Israel Aparicio	Submission (keylock)	2	1:33
Lightweight	Ismael Leon	def.	Brady Harrison	Technical Submission (rear-naked choke)	1	2:14
Welterweight	Josh Taylor	def.	Ulises Briones	TKO (punches)	1	2:14
Middleweight	Gabriel Rea	def.	Rigoberto Pérez	TKO (punches)	1	2:27

== UWC Mexico 3: Tijuana vs. Brazil ==
UWC Mexico 3: Tijuana vs. Brazil
- Promotion: Ultimate Warrior Challenge Mexico
- Date: July 18, 2009
- Venue: Auditorio Fausto Gutiérrez Moreno
- City: Tijuana, Mexico

Event chronology
UWC Mexico 2: Furia Cachanilla	UWC Mexico 3: Tijuana vs. Brazil	UWC Mexico 4: Renacimiento

UWC Mexico 3: Tijuana vs. Brazil was a mixed martial arts event held by Ultimate Warrior Challenge Mexico on July 18, 2009, at the Auditorio Fausto Gutiérrez Moreno in Tijuana, Mexico.

=== Background ===
At this event, the UWC featherweight and lightweight championships were inaugurated. The two title fights were Antonio Duarte vs. Rafael Salomão for the featherweight title and David Mariscal vs. Miguel Pardinas for the lightweight title.

=== Results ===
Main card
Weight class				Method	Round	Time	Notes
Lightweight	Antonio Duarte	def.	Rafael Salomão	TKO (punches)	2	4:54	(Note: For the UWC Featherweight Championship)
Light Heavyweight	David Mariscal	def.	Miguel Pardinas	TKO (punches)	2	2:08	(Note: For the UWC Lightweight Championship)
Light Heavyweight	Omar Jiménez	def.	Delon Williams	TKO (punches)	1	0:14
Lightweight	Henry Briones	def.	Juan Delgado	Submission (triangle choke)	1	3:11
Welterweight	Juan Manuel Torres	def.	J.J. Williams	TKO (punches)	1	2:37
Flyweight	Mayra Arce	def.	Christina Marks	Decision (unanimous)	3	5:00
Middleweight	Edgar Medina	def.	Justin Vázquez	Submission (rear-naked choke)	1	1:12
Heavyweight	Mario Muñoz	def.	Steve Fischetti	KO (punch)	2	2:54
Bantamweight	Ismael Leon	def.	Alexis Canett	TKO (punches)	1	1:32
Lightweight	Eduardo Espinoza	def.	Michael Asaro	Submission (rear-naked choke)	1	2:09
Lightweight	Brady Harrison	def.	Martín Pérez	TKO (punches)	2	3:19
Welterweight	Josh Taylor	def.	Carlos López	TKO (punches)	2	2:21

== UWC Mexico 4: Renacimiento ==
UWC Mexico 4: Renacimiento
- Promotion: Ultimate Warrior Challenge Mexico
- Date: November 18, 2009
- Venue: Auditorio Fausto Gutiérrez Moreno
- City: Tijuana, Mexico

Event chronology
UWC Mexico 3: Tijuana vs. Brazil	UWC Mexico 4: Renacimiento	UWC Mexico 5: Bloody Valentine

UWC Mexico 4: Renacimiento was a mixed martial arts event held by Ultimate Warrior Challenge Mexico on November 18, 2009, at the Auditorio Fausto Gutiérrez Moreno in Tijuana, Mexico.

=== Background ===
The main event featured a UWC Featherweight Championship fight between champion Antonio Duarte and Juan Manuel Torres.

The co-main event was a UWC Lightweight Championship fight between champion David Mariscal and Leobardo López Caloca.

=== Results ===
Main card
Weight class				Method	Round	Time	Notes
Featherweight	Antonio Duarte (c)	def.	Juan Manuel Torres	Submission (guillotine choke)	1	4:30	(Note: For the UWC Featherweight Championship)
Light Heavyweight	David Mariscal (c)	def.	Leobardo López Caloca	KO (punch)	1	4:19	(Note: For the UWC Lightweight Championship)
Welterweight	Gabriel Benítez	def.	Tito Castro	TKO (punches)	2	0:13
Bantamweight	Mayra Arce	def.	Margarita de la Cruz	Decision (unanimous)	3	5:00
Lightweight	Manuel Ramos Gallareta	def.	Brady Harrison	Submission (armbar)	1	2:17
Welterweight	Eduardo Espinoza	def.	Josh Taylor	Decision (majority)	3	5:00
Bantamweight	Walel Watson	def.	Kisack Monroy	Submission (rear-naked choke)	1	2:12
Lightweight	Miguel Enrique Torres	def.	Jaime Flores	TKO (doctor stoppage)	1	1:06
Featherweight	Carlos Resendíz	def.	Carlo Catada	Decision (unanimous)	3	5:00
Featherweight	Seth Humpries	def.	Orlando Pacheco	Submission (rear-naked choke)	2	1:10
