= Mougins Museum of Classical Art =

Art museum in Mougins, France

Musée d’Art Classique de Mougins
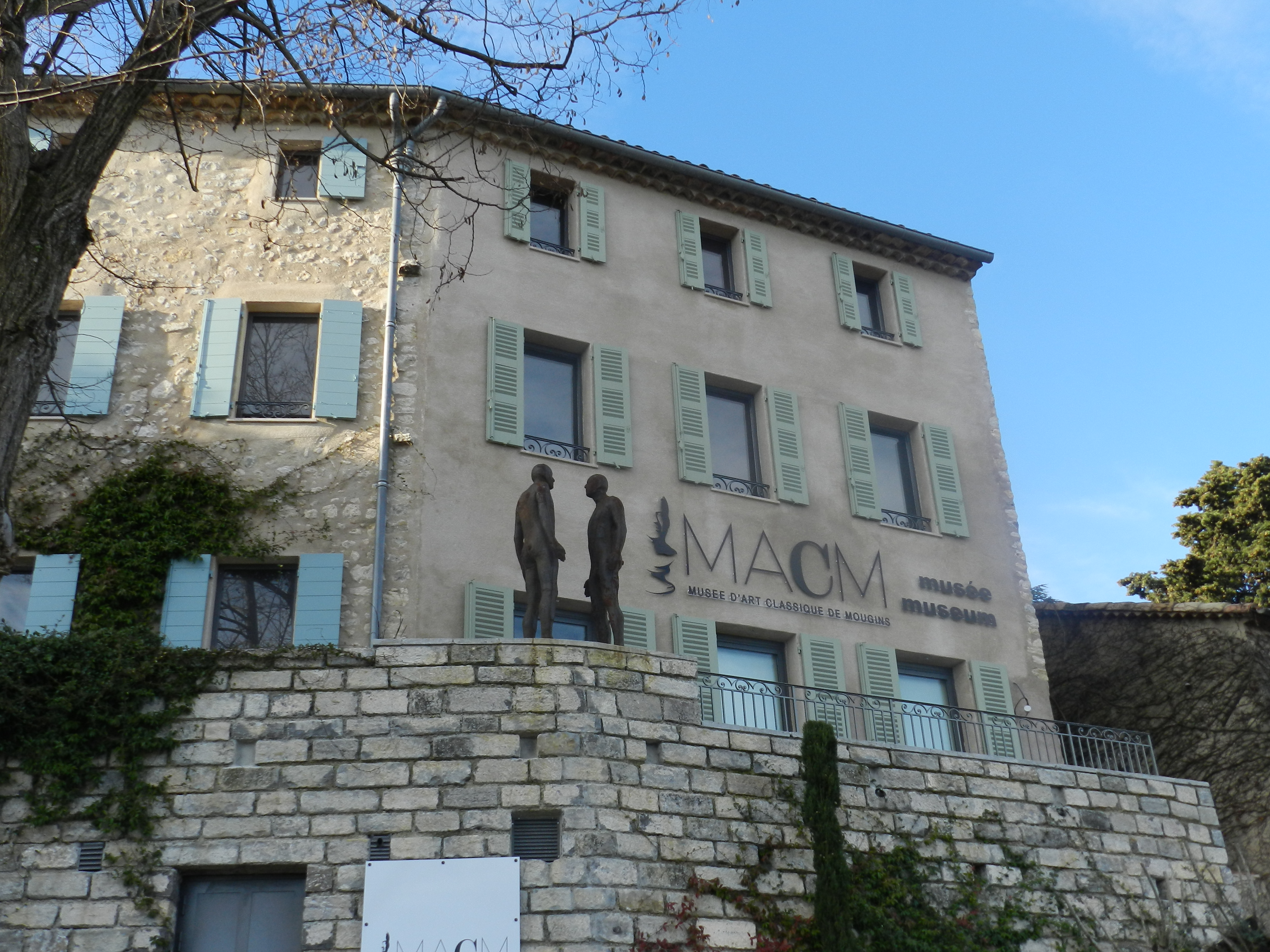
- The MACM facade
- Interactive fullscreen map
- Established: 2011
- Location: 32, rue Commandeur / 06250 Mougins, France
- Coordinates: 43°36′05″N 6°59′41″E
- Type: Art museum
- Website: Official site

The MACM, the Mougins Museum of Classical Art (Musée d’Art Classique de Mougins) was a private museum inaugurated in June 2011 in the village of Mougins in the Alpes-Maritimes department, France. In August 2023, the MACAM closed to make way for a new museum, the Female Artists of Mougins Museum (FAMM), which opened in June 2024.

The museum's director was Leisa Paoli.

== Concept of the Mougins Museum ==
Ancient artworks used to be presented with paintings, drawings, and sculptures by artists such as Henri Matisse, Marc Chagall, Raoul Dufy, Paul Cézanne, Auguste Rodin, Salvador Dalí, Andy Warhol, Marc Quinn, Antony Gormley, and Damien Hirst, amongst many others. The collection also included works by artists who spent time in Mougins, such as Francis Picabia, Jean Cocteau, Man Ray, and Pablo Picasso (who spent the final 12 years of his life in Mougins village). The museum embraced the visionary concept of displaying ancient, neo-classical, modern and contemporary art side by side to show the pervasive and lasting influence of the ancient world. Thus works by Sir Peter Paul Rubens, Marc Chagall, Henri Matisse, Damien Hirst and others were included in the museum alongside their ancient sources of inspiration.

This dialogue and fusion between ancient and modern was made particularly clear in the museum with iconic displays such as, for example, depictions of the Greek Goddess Aphrodite by Warhol, Dalí and Yves Klein accompany 1st and 2nd century AD depictions of the Goddess, in marble and in bronze.

The museum's large and diverse collection of antiquities included Roman, Greek and Egyptian sculpture, vases, coins, and jewellery, and the world's largest private collection of ancient arms and armour .

The museum has won several international awards and has loaned dozens of objects to other museums and university exhibitions all over the world.

== History of the Mougins Museum ==
The founder of the museum is Christian Levett, a British investment manager renowned for his great interest in history and art. A collector since childhood, in 2009 he formed the museum to place his antiquity and classical art collection on public display. The Musée de Mougins was created by remodelling a 600m^{2} medieval edifice to house his collection. The building itself used to be the village prison in medieval times, it was then turned into a mill before becoming a private residence in the 1950s. The interior was entirely renovated to display the collection while the façade remains in its original style.

Christian Levett, a philanthropist, sponsored multiple exhibitions at The British Museum, Royal Academy, National Gallery, Sir John Soane's Museum and the Ashmolean Museum in Oxford. He has funded archaeological works in the UK, Spain, Italy and Egypt and sponsored academic scholarships at Wolfson College and The Ruskin School of Art in Oxford. He has aided curatorial funding at The Ashmolean, The British Museum, and The British School at Rome.

As well as this, he has funded renovation works at The Charterhouse Museum London, Charterhouse School Surrey, The National Gallery and the chapel Notre Dame de Vie in Mougins, and has sponsored conferences at King's College London, Senate House UCL and at The Mougins Museum. He is a member of the Arms and Armour Committee at The Metropolitan Museum of New York and member of The Board of Visitors at The Ashmolean Museum Oxford. He is a past board member of The Hadrian's Wall Trust. Levett is also an Honorary Fellow of The Ashmolean Museum, an honorary fellow of Wolfson College Oxford and a member of the Oxford University Chancellors Court of Benefactors.

On 29 October 2019, Levett consigned for sale at Christie's a marble statue of the Emperor Hadrian from his collection, known as the Cobham Hall Hadrian, to benefit the Museum.

== Collection at the Mougins Museum ==
The MACM was spread over four floors from the crypt to the second floor as follows: The Egyptian Gallery (the "crypt") used to depict the theme of the afterlife with funerary masks, numerous other ancient artefacts and a sarcophagus, punctuated with works from Chagall, Calder, Rubens and Cocteau. The People and Personalities Gallery on the ground floor presented busts and statues of historical figures from ancient Greece and Rome, their influence highlighted by sculptures of Sosno, Arman, Quinn and Hirst. The Gods and Goddesses Gallery, on the first floor, displayed Greek and Roman bronzes, marble statues, pottery, glass and silverware, an extensive collection of coins and a display case dedicated to antique jewellery. Works by artists such as Renoir, Rodin, Klein, Warhol, Picasso, Modigliani, Braque and Dalí were exhibited alongside. The Armoury, on the second floor, was a fantastic focus on the largest private collection of Greek and Roman arms and armour in the world.

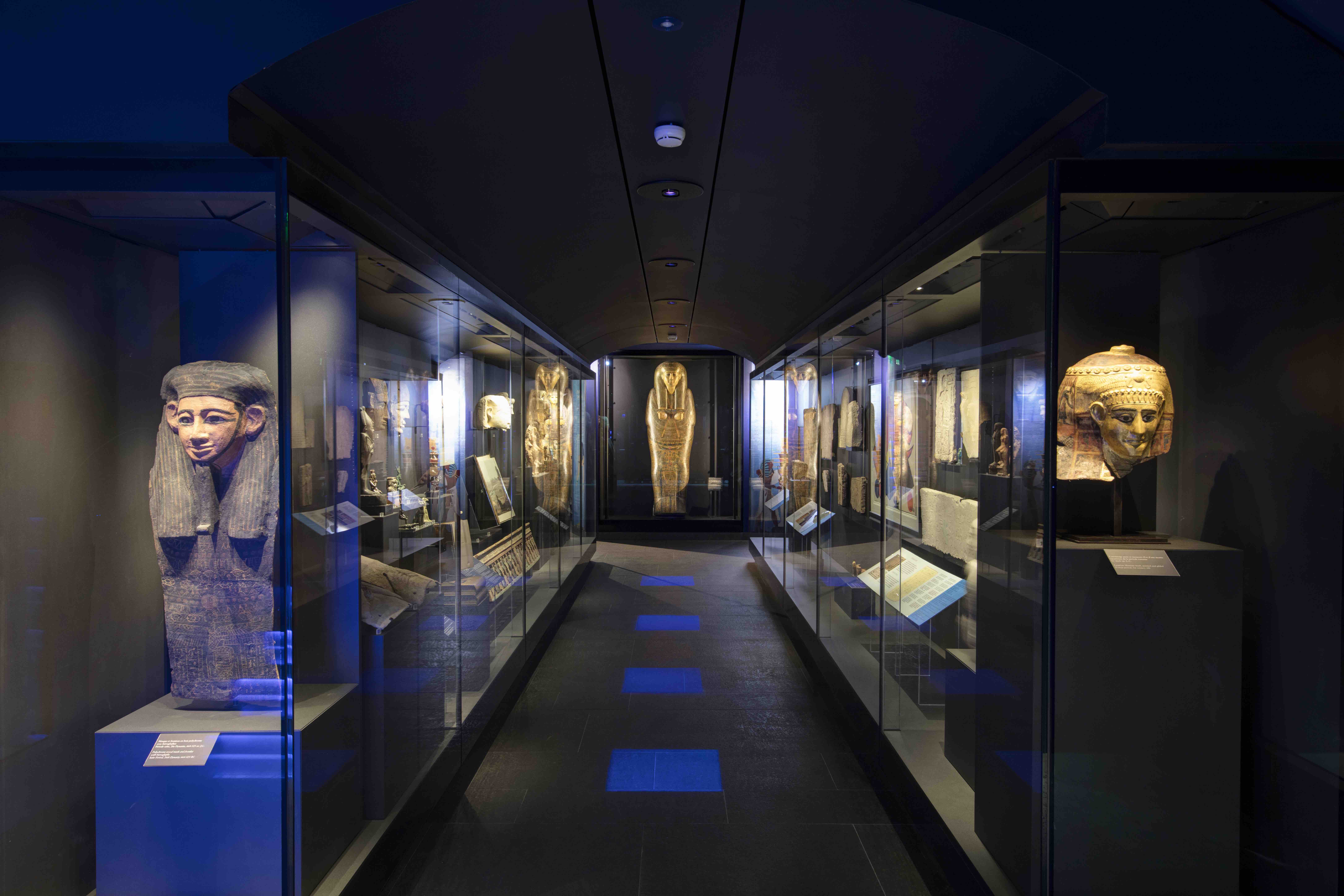
The Egyptian Gallery

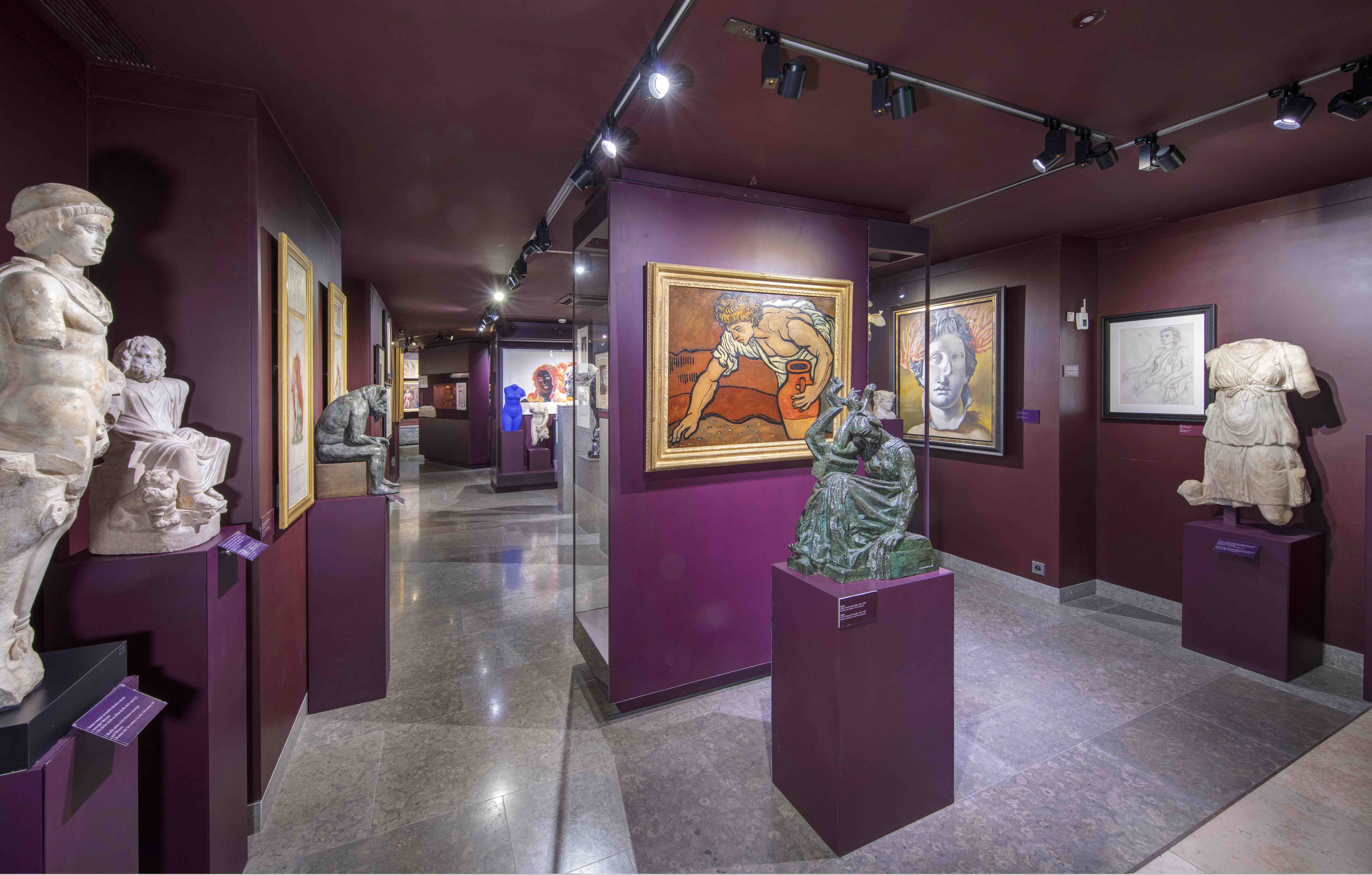
The Gods and Goddesses Gallery

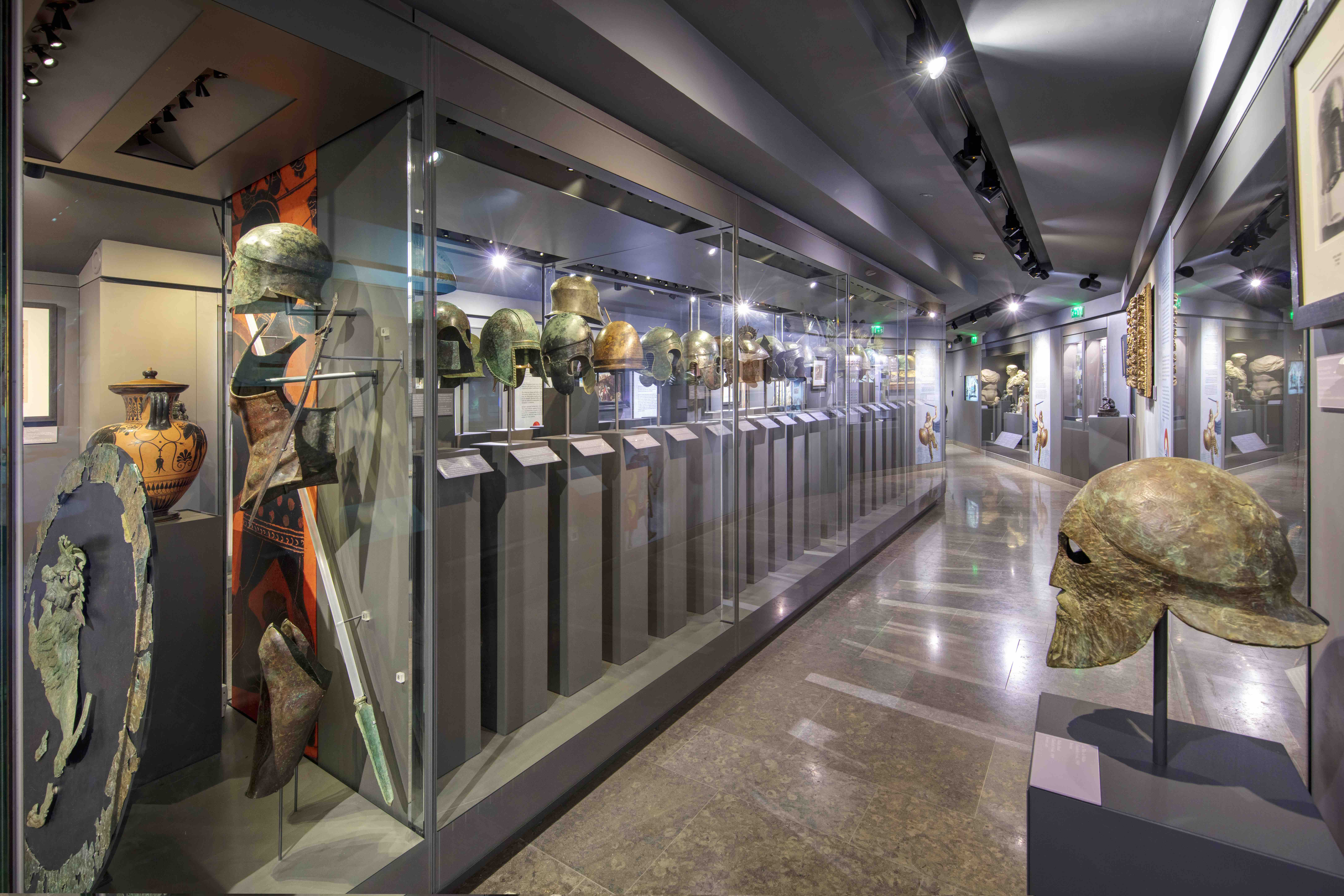
The Armoury

== Publications ==
The MACM has produced several publications, including:

- Mougins Museum of Classical Art, 2011, edited by M. Merrony
- La Collection Famille Levett, 2012, edited by M. Merrony and translated by C. Dauphin
- Animals in the Ancient World, 2014, C. Dauphin
- Pompeii in Pictures, 2015, K. Schörle
- Les Animaux dans le Monde Antique, 2016, C. Dauphin
- Dufy Dessine le Sud, 2019, F. Guillon Laffaille

== Exhibitions ==
The permanent collection at the MACM has evolved throughout the life of the museum. New pieces were acquired with a view to sustaining and developing the museum's concept of the fusion of ancient and modern art and the influence that Antiquity has had on subsequent artistic creation. The Museum has also hosted and been otherwise involved in many temporary exhibitions:

== Exhibitions at the Mougins Museum ==
- Doric, Sean Scully. 12 July - 29 September 2013
- Vessels, Gary Komarin. 1 May – 29 June 2014
- Layers of Time, Alexander Mihaylovich. 10 April - 14 June 2015
- Pompeii in pictures, Giorgio Sommer. 19 June – 2 August 2015
- Animal, The Levett Bestiary collection. February – June 2016
- Past is present, Léo Caillard. 16 March – 27 May 2018
- Bleu-Topique, Johan Van Mullem. 16 November 2018 – 17 March 2019
- Dufy dessine le Sud (Dufy depicts the South), Raoul Dufy. 23 March - 1 September 2019
- Jean Cocteau & Sa Mythologie (Jean Cocteau & His Mythology), 11 September 2020 – 24 January 2021 (extended to 27 June 2021)
- Jake Wood Evans, 15 October 2021 – 30 January 2022
- Coup de crayon, 20 June – 2 April 2023
- Picasso Vu par les Autres (Picasso Through Others' Eyes), 8 April - 30 August 2023

== 'Hors Les Murs' external exhibitions ==
- Mythes et Héros (Myths and Heroes), 14 April – 28 May 2012

A collaboration with the town of Mougins at the Espace Culturel de Mougins

- Picasso à Mougins (Picasso in Mougins), 28 March – 12 May 2013

A collaboration with the town of Mougins at the Espace Culturel de Mougins

- Picasso at the Mas Candille, Lucien Clergue, 15 – 26 May 2013

A collaboration with the 5* Relais & Chateaux hotel Le Mas Candille at Le Mas Candille, Mougins

- Sacha Sosno. Un hommage, 8 May – 15 June 2014

A collaboration with the town of Mougins at the Espace Culturel de Mougins

- Mougins Monumental 2015, 4 April – 30 August 2015

A collaboration with the town of Mougins - open air exhibition in Mougins Village

- Ici et maintenant (Here and now), 15 September – 31 December 2016

A collaboration between the FRAC, the town of Mougins, and the association MVE (Mougins Village Energy).

- Mougins Monumental 2016, 5 March – 29 May 2016

A collaboration with the town of Mougins - open air exhibition in Mougins Village

- The Classical Now, 2 March – 28 April 2018

A collaboration with King's College of London at The Arcade at Bush House & The Inigo Rooms, Somerset House East Wing King's College London, UK

- Napoléon. L’héritage Napoléonien de l’Égypte à nos jours ("Napoleon and his legacy from Egypt to the present day") 5 July – 30 Septembre 2021

A collaboration with the town of Mougins- Espace Culturel de Mougins

== International loans ==
The MACM's important loan programme has seen numerous artefacts and artworks on loan to the following establishments:

- Art Institute Chicago, Chicago, United States of America
- Braunschweigisches Landesmuseum, Brunswick, Germany
- British Museum, London, UK
- Espace d'Art Concret, Mouans Sartoux, France
- Estorick Collection of Modern Italian Art, London, UK
- Fondation Pierre-Gianadda, Martigny, Switzerland
- Fondazione Prada, Venice, Italy
- Kellos Gallery, London, UK
- King's College London, London, UK
- Musée d'Archéologie Méditerranéenne, Vieille Charité, Marseille, France
- Musée d'Archéologie de Nice, France
- Musée de la Légion étrangère, Aubagne, France
- Musée Massena, Nice, France
- Musée National du Sport, Nice, France
- Musée National Marc Chagall, Nice, France
- Musée Regards de Provence, Marseille, France
- Musée Saint-Raymond, Toulouse, France
- Römisch-Germanisches Museum, Cologne, Germany
- Royal Academy of Arts, London, UK
- Sao Paulo Museum of Modern Art (MASP), São Paulo, Brazil
- Segedunum Roman Fort, Wallsend, UK
- Sir John Soane's Museum, London, UK
- The J. Paul Getty Museum, Los Angeles, USA
- The Jewish Museum, New York, USA
- Tullie House Museum & Art Gallery, Carlisle, UK
- Vindolanda Trust Fort and Museum, Hexham, UK
- The Wallace Collection, London, UK
- Walters Art Museum, Baltimore, USA

== Prizes and accolades ==
- Winner of the Apollo's Museum Opening of the Year award in 2011.
- Winner of the Nouveau Tourisme Culturel award Ken d’Or 2012.
- Nominated for the European Museum of the Year award 2013
- Nominated in the Virtual Reality/Augmented Reality category at the CLIC Patrimoine and Innovation(s) 2017 awards.
- TripAdvisor's Certificates of Excellence in 2012, 2013, 2014, 2015, 2016, 2017 and 2018
- Obtained the government-approved brand ‘Quality Tourism’ in 2016.

== See also ==
- Mougins Center of Photography

== General references ==
- "L'Antiquité au goût du jour", Connaissance des Arts, July–August 2012
- "J’ai fait un rêve…", Zibeline Magazine, June 2012
- "The Acquisitive Gene", Apollo Magazine, 1 February 2012
- "The French Collection", The Financial Times, 30 December 2011
- "Museum opening of the Year Apollo Magazine", Apollo Magazine, 1 December 2011
