= Philip Guston =

Canadian-American painter and printmaker (1913–1980)

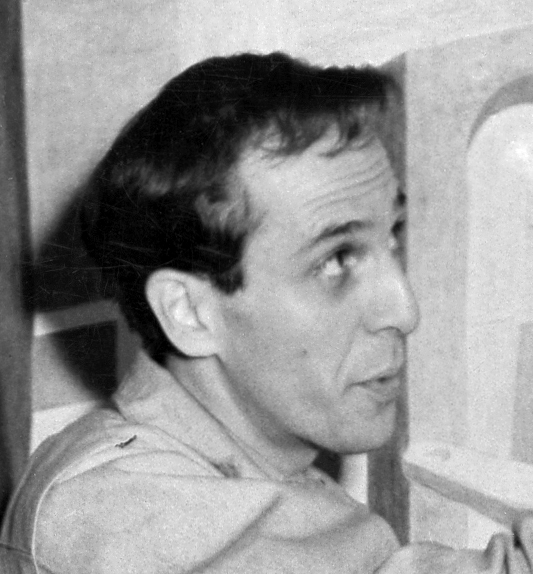
- Guston in 1940
- Born: Phillip Goldstein; June 27, 1913; Montreal, Quebec, Canada
- Died: June 7, 1980 (aged 66); Woodstock, New York, US
- Education: Los Angeles Manual Arts High School, Otis Art Institute
- Known for: Painter, graphic artist, muralist, printmaker
- Style: Cartoon, Abstract
- Movement: Abstract expressionism, Neoexpressionism, figurative painting, New York School
- Spouse: Musa McKim
- Patrons: David McKee

Signature
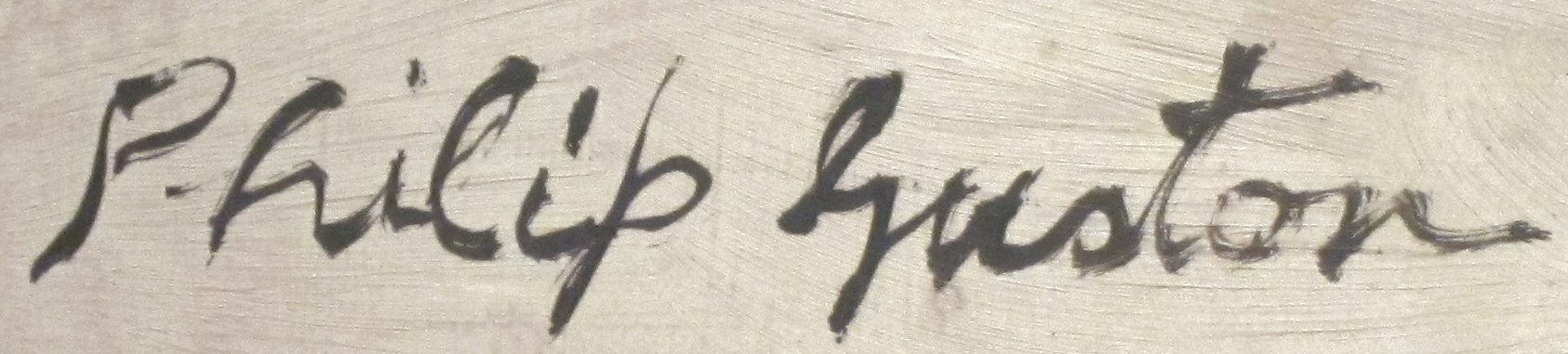

Philip Guston (born Phillip Goldstein, June 27, 1913 – June 7, 1980) was a Canadian and American painter, printmaker, muralist and draftsman. "Guston worked in a number of artistic modes, from Renaissance-inspired figuration to formally accomplished abstraction," and is now regarded as one of the "most important, powerful, and influential American painters of the last 100 years". He frequently depicted racism, antisemitism, fascism and American identity, as well as—especially in his later most cartoonish and mocking work—the banality of evil. In 2013, Guston's painting To Fellini set an auction record at Christie's when it sold for US$25.8 million.

Guston was a founding figure in the mid-century New York School, which established New York as the new center of the global art world, and his work appeared in the famed Ninth Street Show and in the avant-garde art journal It is. A Magazine for Abstract Art. By the 1960s, Guston had renounced abstract expressionism and was helping pioneer a modified form of representational art known as neo-expressionism. "Calling American abstract art 'a lie' and 'a sham,' he pivoted to making paintings in a dark, figurative style, including satirical drawings of Richard Nixon" during the Vietnam War as well as several paintings of hooded Klansmen, which Guston explained this way: "They are self-portraits ... I perceive myself as being behind the hood ... The idea of evil fascinated me ... I almost tried to imagine that I was living with the Klan." The paintings of Klan figures were set to be part of an international retrospective sponsored by the National Gallery of Art, the Tate Modern, the Museum of Fine Arts, Houston, and the Museum of Fine Arts, Boston in 2020, but in late September, the museums jointly postponed the exhibition until 2024, "a time at which we think that the powerful message of social and racial justice that is at the center of Philip Guston's work can be more clearly interpreted."

The announcement spurred an open letter, published online by The Brooklyn Rail and signed by more than 2,000 artists. It criticizes the postponement and the museums' lack of courage to display or attempt to interpret Guston's work, as well as the museums' own "history of prejudice". It calls Guston's KKK themes a timely catalyst for a "reckoning" with cultural and institutional white supremacy, and argues that that is why the exhibition must proceed without delay. On October 28, 2020, the museums announced earlier exhibition dates starting in 2022.

== Biography ==
=== Early years ===
The child of Ukrainian Jewish parents who escaped the persecution of pogroms by immigrating to Canada from Odessa, Guston was born in Montreal in 1913 and moved to Los Angeles in 1919. The family were aware of the regular Ku Klux Klan activities against Jews and Blacks which were taking place across California. In 1923, possibly owing to persecution or the difficulty of securing an income, his father hanged himself in the shed, and the young boy found the body.

Guston's interest in drawing led his mother to enroll him in a correspondence course from the Cleveland School of Cartooning. In 1927, at the age of 14, Guston began painting and enrolled in the Los Angeles Manual Arts High School, where he met Jackson Pollock, who became a lifelong friend. The two studied under Frederick John de St. Vrain Schwankovsky and were introduced to European modern art, Eastern philosophy, theosophy and mystic literature. The pair later published a paper opposing the high school's emphasis on sports over art, which led to expulsions, although Pollock eventually returned and graduated.

Apart from his high school education and a one-year scholarship at the Otis Art Institute in Los Angeles, which left him dissatisfied, Guston remained a largely self-taught artist, influenced by, among others, the Italian painter Giorgio de Chirico, whom Guston repeatedly acknowledged throughout his career.

=== Work ===
==== Political murals ====
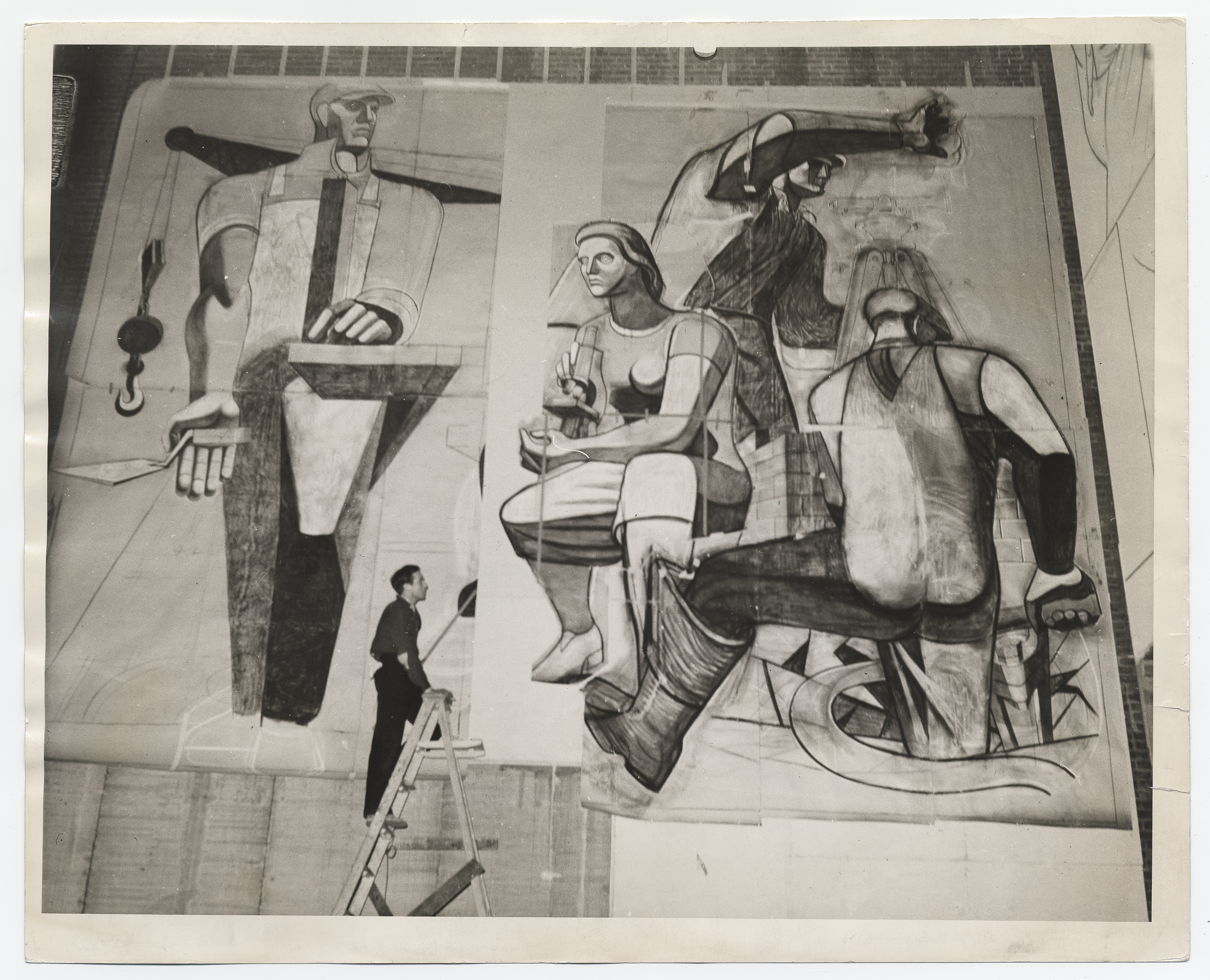
Guston sketching a mural for the WPA Federal Art Project in 1939.

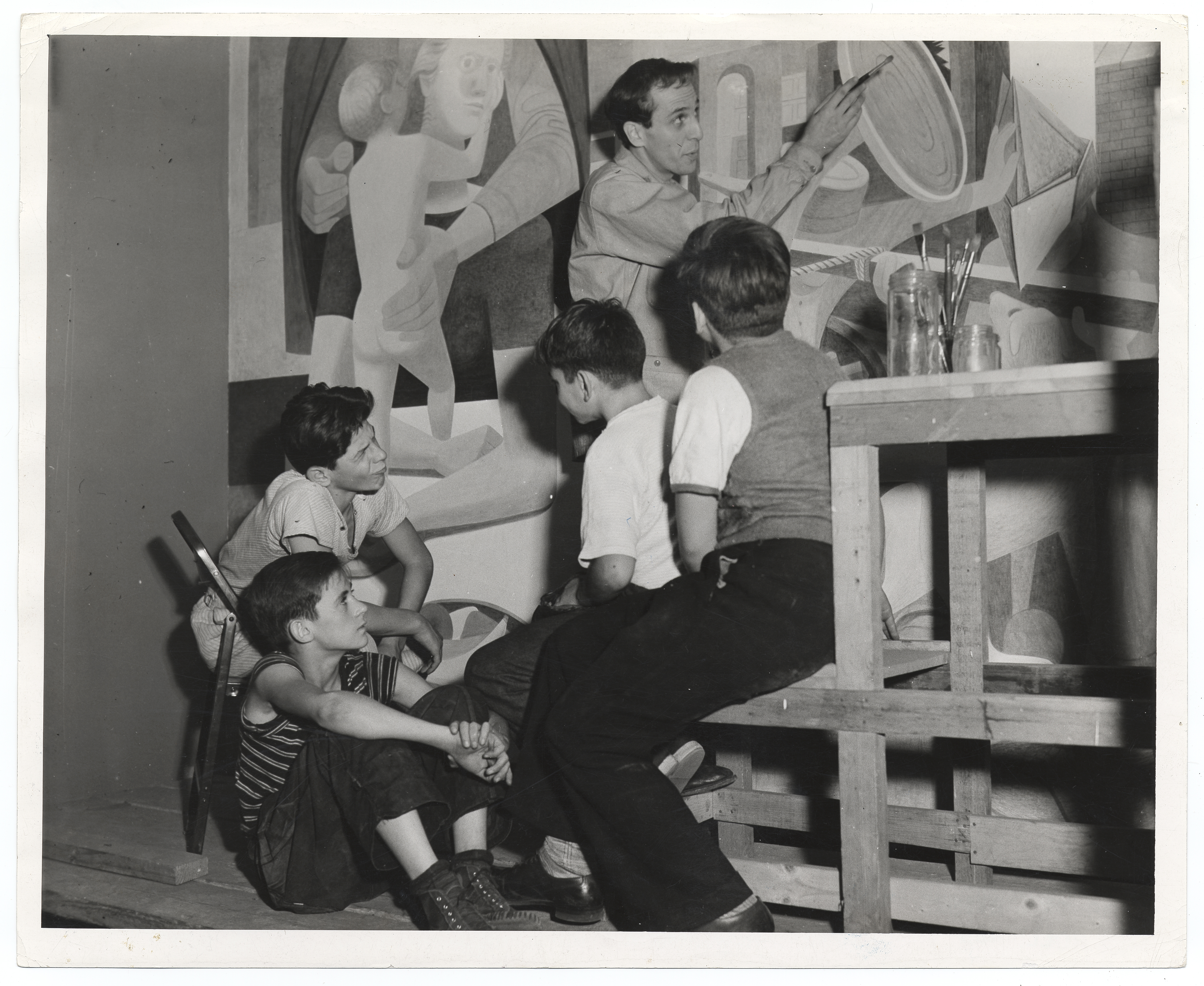
Philip Guston painting another Federal Art Project mural in 1940 (photograph by Sol Libsohn).

As an early activist, in 1932, the 18-year-old Guston produced an indoor mural with the artist Reuben Kadish in an effort by the communist-affiliated John Reed Club of Los Angeles to raise money in support of the defendants in the Scottsboro Boys Trial, in which nine Black teenagers were falsely accused of a rape in Alabama and sentenced to death." The mural was then defaced by local police forces, organized into violent anti-communist Red Squads. The subsequent court ruling found no fault on the part of the L.A. police, even though irreversible damage was sustained to many works of art.

In 1934, Philip Goldstein (who had not yet changed his name to Guston) and Kadish joined their friend the poet Jules Langsner on a trip to Mexico, where they were commissioned to paint a 1,000-square-foot (93 m^{2}) mural on a wall in the former summer palace of the Emperor Maximilian in the state capital of Morelia. They produced the impressive The Struggle Against Terror, whose antifascist themes were clearly influenced by the work of David Siqueiros. The mural "includes the hooded figures that became a lifelong symbol of bigotry for the artist." The mural was covered up as it was considered undesirable by the Church; it was rediscovered years later, deteriorated, and later underwent a long restoration and was put on public view in 2025.

A two-page review in Time magazine quoted Siqueiros's description of Guston and Kadish: "the most promising painters in either the US or Mexico." In Mexico Guston met and spent time with Frida Kahlo and her husband Diego Rivera. In 1934–35, Guston and Kadish completed a mural, still on display, at City of Hope Medical Center, a tuberculosis hospital at the time, in Duarte, California, US.

==== WPA murals ====
In September 1935, aged 22, Guston moved to New York, where he worked as an artist in the WPA program during the Great Depression. In 1937, he married the artist and poet Musa McKim, whom he first met at Otis, and they collaborated on several WPA murals. During this period his work included strong references to Renaissance painters such as Piero della Francesca, Paolo Uccello, Masaccio, and Giotto. He was also influenced by American Regionalists and Mexican mural painters. In 1938 he painted a post office mural in the US post office in Commerce, Georgia, entitled Early Mail Service and the Construction of Railroads. In 1943, he completed a mural entitled Reconstruction and Well-Being of the Family for the Social Security Building (today known as the Wilbur J. Cohen Federal Building) in Washington, D.C. As of December, 2025, the latter mural was under threat of demolition.

==== Abstract expressionism ====
Abstract expressionism and Neoexpressionism

Zone, 1953–1954, oil on canvas, The Edward R. Broida Trust, Los Angeles

Cherries III, 1976, oil on canvas, Honolulu Museum of Art

In the 1950s, Guston achieved success and renown as a first-generation abstract expressionist, although he preferred the term New York School. During this period his paintings often consisted of blocks and masses of gestural strokes and marks of color floating within the picture plane, as seen in his painting Zone, 1953–1954. These works, with marks often grouped toward the center of the composition, recall the "plus and minus" compositions of Piet Mondrian or the late Nymphea canvases by Monet.

Guston used a relatively limited palette, favoring black and white, grays, blues and reds. It was a palette that would remain evident in his later work, despite Guston's attempts to expand his palette and reintroduce abstraction to his work late in life, as evidenced in some of his untitled work from 1980 that has more blues and yellows.

==== Neoexpressionism ====
In 1967, Guston moved to Woodstock, New York. He was increasingly frustrated with abstraction and began painting representationally again, but in a personal, cartoonish manner. "It disappointed many when he returned to figuration with aplomb, painting mysterious images in which cartoonish-looking cups, heads, easels, and other visions were depicted against vacant beige backgrounds. People whispered behind his back: "He's out of his mind, and this isn't art," curator Michael Auping said. "He could have ruined his reputation, and some people said he did." The first exhibition of these new figurative paintings, including The Studio, Blackboard, and City Limits, was held in 1970 at the Marlborough Gallery in New York. It received scathing reviews from most of the art establishment. Memorably, New York Times art critic Hilton Kramer ridiculed Guston's new style in an article entitled "A Mandarin Pretending to Be a Stumblebum", referring to "mandarin" in the sense of an influential figure and "stumblebum" meaning a clumsy person. He called the act of changing styles an "illusion" and an "artifice". The initial reaction of Robert Hughes, critic for Time magazine, who later changed his views, was put into a scathing review entitled "Ku Klux Komix".

According to Musa Mayer's biography of her father in Night Studio, the painter Willem de Kooning was one of the few who instantly understood the importance of these paintings, telling Guston at the time that they were "about freedom." Cherries III from 1976, held in the collection of the Honolulu Museum of Art, is an example of his late-style representational paintings. Although cherries are a mundane subject, their spiky stems can be a metaphor for the crudeness and brutality of modern life.

As a result of the poor reception of his new figurative style, Guston isolated himself even more in Woodstock, far from the art world that had so utterly misunderstood his art.

In 1960, at the peak of his activity as an abstractionist, Guston said, "There is something ridiculous and miserly in the myth we inherit from abstract art. That painting is autonomous, pure and for itself, therefore we habitually analyze its ingredients and define its limits. But painting is 'impure'. It is the adjustment of 'impurities' which forces its continuity. We are image-makers and image-ridden." From 1968 onward, after moving away from abstraction, he created a lexicon of images such as Klansmen, light bulbs, shoes, cigarettes and clocks. In late 2009, the McKee gallery, Guston's long-time dealer, mounted a show revealing that lexicon in 49 small oil paintings on panel painted between 1969 and 1972 that had never been publicly displayed.

A catalogue raisonné of the artist's work was compiled by the Guston Foundation in 2013, coinciding with recent scholarly interest that explored the periods he spent in Italy.

== Legacy ==
=== Public collections ===
- Art Institute of Chicago
- Detroit Institute of Arts
- Governor Nelson A. Rockefeller Empire State Plaza Art Collection (Albany, NY)
- High Museum of Art, Atlanta
- Honolulu Museum of Art, Hawai
- Metropolitan Museum of Art, New York
- Museum of Modern Art (MoMA), New York
- Modern Art Museum of Fort Worth, Texas
- National Gallery of Art, Washington DC
- Pérez Art Museum Miami, Florida
- Tate Modern, London
- Virginia Museum of Fine Arts, Virginia

In 2022, Guston's daughter, Musa Mayer, made a promised gift of 96 paintings and 124 drawings from her personal collection to the Metropolitan Museum of Art; this acquisition of more than 200 pieces is the largest collection of Guston's work held by a single institution. In 2023, the Museum celebrated this promised gift with the Philip Guston: What Kind of Man Am I? exhibition. In 2025, Mayer reflected about her father and his legacy.

=== Academic affiliations ===
Guston was a lecturer and teacher at a number of universities, and served as an artist-in-residence at the School of Art and Art History at the University of Iowa from 1941 to 1945. He then served an artist-in-residence at the St. Louis School of Fine Arts at Washington University in St. Louis, Missouri until 1947. He continued with his teaching at New York University and at the Pratt Institute in Brooklyn and, from 1973 to 1978, he conducted a monthly graduate seminar at Boston University.

Among Guston's students were two graduates of the University of Iowa, painters Stephen Greene (1917–1999) and Fridtjof Schroder (1917–1990), as well as Ken Kerslake (1930–2007), who attended the Pratt Institute. Rosemary Zwick was a student at Iowa. Among those who attended his graduate seminars at Boston University were painter Gary Komarin (1951–), sculptor and painter Susan Mastrangelo (1951–) and new media artist Christina McPhee (1954–).

He was also posthumously elected to the National Academy of Design as an Associate Academician.

=== 2020 controversy ===
In the fall of 2020, Philip Guston Now, a long-planned traveling retrospective of Guston's work, which included 24 of the Klan paintings, was postponed until 2024 by the traveling show's four sponsoring institutions: the National Gallery of Art; the Tate Modern; the Museum of Fine Arts, Houston; and the Museum of Fine Arts, Boston. In a joint press release issued by the museums, they wrote: "The racial justice movement that started in the U.S. and radiated to countries around the world, in addition to challenges of a global health crisis, have led us to pause," explaining that the international tour, which had already been rescheduled because of the coronavirus, was best delayed "until a time at which we think that the powerful message of social and racial justice ... can be more clearly interpreted." Public response led to a "deluge of criticism from inside the art world", as well as major articles in New York magazine, The New York Times, CNN, Artforum, Tablet, and The Wall Street Journal, among other publications.

The most scathing response was collective, and organized in an open letter published online by The Brooklyn Rail. The letter featured a "list of signatories [that] reads like a roll call of the most accomplished American artists alive: old and young, white and Black, local and expat, painters and otherwise," including Matthew Barney, Nicole Eisenman, Charles Gaines, Ellen Gallagher, Wade Guyton, Rachel Harrison, Joan Jonas, Julie Mehretu, Adrian Piper, Pope.L, Martin Puryear, Amy Sillman, Lorna Simpson, Henry Taylor, and Christopher Williams. Strongly criticizing the museums' lack of courage to display the work, attempt to interpret it, or come to terms with the institutions' own "history of prejudice", the signers unanimously described the exhibition as a timely prompt for a "reckoning" — adding that that was why it must proceed as scheduled. As of October 3, 2020, more than 2,000 artists had signed the letter, but the exhibition organizers did not respond until they rescheduled the exhibition for dates beginning in 2022. Philip Guston Now opened at the Museum of Fine Arts in Boston on May 1, 2022.

=== Popular culture ===
In "Cat and Girl versus Contemporary Art", part of the Cat and Girl webcomic series, author Dorothy Gambrell critiques the difficulty and purpose of finding the meaning behind art using Guston's iconic Head and Bottle painting.

== Auction record ==
In May 2013, Christie's set an auction record for the artist's work To Fellini, which sold for US$25.8 million.

== See also ==
- Boston Expressionism
- Max Beckmann
- Composer Morton Feldman frequently drew inspiration from Guston's abstract expressionist work, including in the four-hour chamber composition For Philip Guston.
- Red Grooms
- Claes Oldenburg
- Jean Dubuffet
