= Achille Pinelli =

Italian painter (1809–1841)

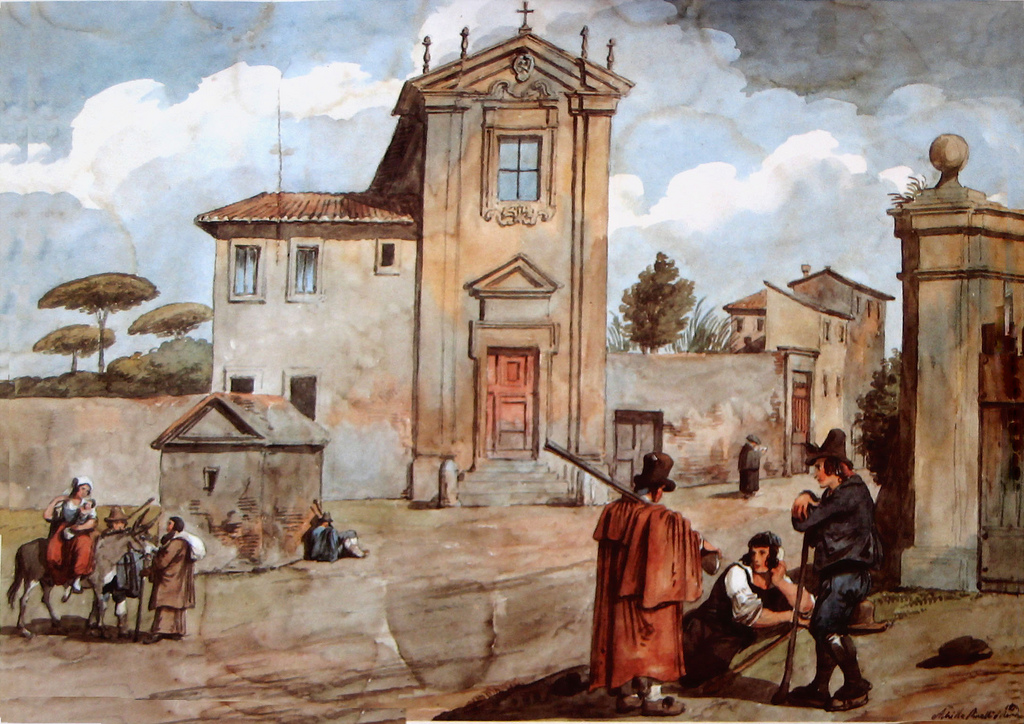
Pinelli's watercolor of the Church of Domine Quo Vadis, Rome

Achille Pinelli (1809 – 5 September 1841) was an Italian painter. Born in Rome, he was the son of the painter Bartolomeo Pinelli and his wife Mariangela Gatti.

Pinelli has left about two hundred watercolors painted between 1826 and 1835, preserved in the Museo di Roma, representing the facades of many churches in Rome. Liliana Barroero and Daniela Gallavotti Cavallero describe the paintings as "remaining useful iconographic documents for edifices that have been lost or since modified, and a frank description of the daily habits of Rome in the first decades of the nineteenth century: processions of sacconi, sentenced to death; street vendors; monks; nuns; police; civilians; children's games; beggars—all animate a lively and populous city". (Note: Italian: ... rimangono utile documento iconografico per edifici scomparsi o successivamente modificati, e per la puntigliosa descrizione dei costumi quotidiani della Roma dei primi decenni dell' Ottocento : processioni di «sacconi», cortei di condannati a morte, venditori ambulanti, frati, monache, gendarmi, borghesi, giochi di bambini, mendicanti animano una città popolaresca e popolosa...)

== Notes and references ==
Notes
