= Meo Patacca =

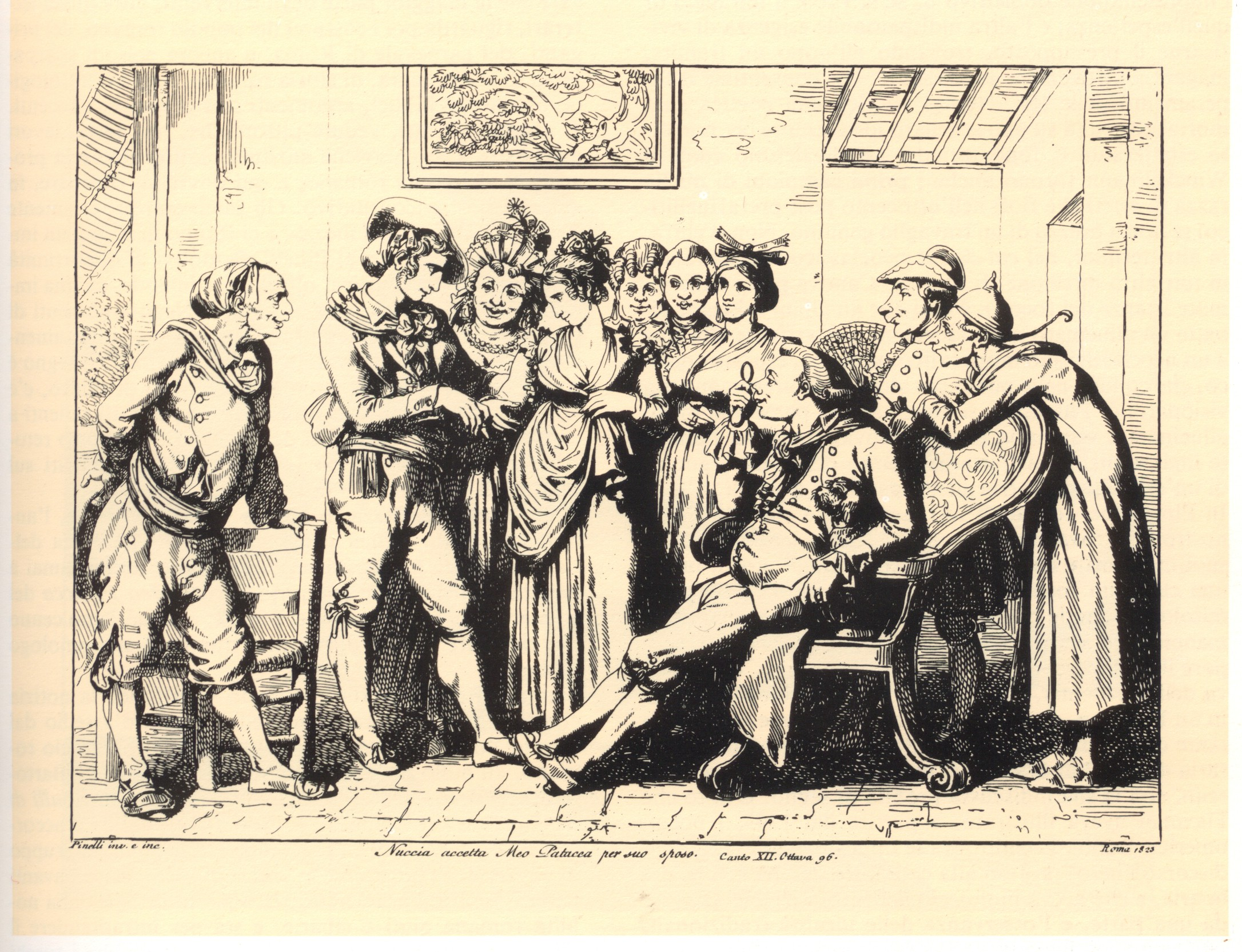
- Pinelli, Meo Patacca. Table 52: Nuccia accetta Meo Patacca come sposo ("Nuccia accepts Meo Pattacca as her husband")
- Author: Giuseppe Berneri
- Language: Romanesco (17th-century dialect of Rome)
- Genre: Narrative poem
- Publisher: First edition: unknown; Second edition: L. Fabri
- Publication date: First edition: 1695; Second edition: 1823
- Publication place: Italy
- Media type: Print
- Pages: 1245 octaves in 12 cantos

"Meo Patacca" (Meo is a pet name and is short for Bartolomeo) or Roma in feste ne i Trionfi di Vienna ("Rome in jubilation for the Triumphs of Vienna") is the name of a poem in rhymes written by Giuseppe Berneri (1637–1700).

== The poem ==
This poem is written in Romanesco, (the Italian dialect spoken in Rome) of the 17th century, and is important because it reveals some elements of both the language and the lifestyle of the Roman people in that period.

It relates the story of a sgherro or a mercenary, who, at the news of the siege of Vienna, decides to organize an expedition to help free the city. The siege really took place in 1683 when the Ottoman army, led by Kara Mustafa Pasha (Bassà in the poem) besieged Vienna for two months.

Just before leaving, however, it is reported that Vienna is free from the siege, so the collected money is then spent to organize a big party.

The poem is composed of 1245 octaves, collected in 12 cantos. In the last verse or Canto there is an account of the religious fanaticism of the time such as in the following: on a weak pretext, the people besiege the Jewish ghetto, accusing the Jewish people of having helped the Turks.

Particularly important for modern scholars, are the descriptions of places, customs, habits and in general the way of life of the Roman people of the time.

The poem was first published in 1695. A second edition was published in 1823 with the title Il Meo Patacca ovvero Roma in feste nei trionfi di Vienna. Poema giocoso nel linguaggio Romanesco di Giuseppe Berneri. Romano Accademico Infecondo ("The Meo Patacca or Rome in Jubilation for the Triumphs of Vienna. Playful poem in the Romanesco language by Giuseppe Berneri, Roman scholar of the Accademia degli Infecondi"). This edition, with 52 illustrations and engravings by Bartolomeo Pinelli, was published by L. Fabri in Via Capo le Case n° 3.

A play inspired by the Meo Patacca, titled Un pranzo a Testaccio o Il matrimonio di Marco Pepe ("A lunch in Testaccio or The marriage of Marco Pepe"), was performed in 1835 at the Pallacorda Theatre.

In the 19th century the character of Meo Patacca was played by two famous actors, Annibale Sansoni and Filippo Tacconi, nicknamed "il Gobbo" ("the Hunchback").

The poem was also made into a movie, directed by Marcello Ciorciolini, and interpreted, among the others, by Mario Scaccia and Gigi Proietti.

== Story ==
The action of the poem begins with the arrival of a messenger in Rome with the news that Vienna has been besieged by the Turks. Meo Patacca, the greatest of all swordsmen in Rome, gets the brilliant idea to amass a troupe of brave and battle-hardened mercenaries (Sgherri arditi e scaltri) to break the siege and save the city. Nuccia, with whom he is in love and wants to marry, begs him not to leave and go to war. In a tearful scene, she manages to make him waver in his intentions and that leaves him worried and anxious.

He walks around in the city, meditating on the next move and finds himself in Piazza Navona with its fountain:

Ce so' poi sopra quattro cantonate,
Et altrettante statue, una pe' parte;
Ce stanno iofamente qui assettate
Se i posti da sedè glie fece l'arte.
Questi so' fiumi con le fogge usate,
Assai famosi in tell'antiche carte:
Nilo, Gange, Danubio, e c'è di più,
Detta rio de la Platta, il gran Pegù.

— Canto 3, octave 21
Translation:

On top there’re four sections,
And equal number of statues, one in each part;
They’re here beautifully sitting
As if Art placed them there in their seats.
Those are rivers each with his attitude,
Very famous in the ancient maps:
Nile, Ganges, Danube, and there's more,
Known as Río de la Plata, the Great Pegù.

And then, later in the same canto:

Et ecco, che già tutto v'ho mostrato,
Sol resta a dirvi, che fu autor famoso
Di quest'opera granne, (et io m'inchino
Alle sue grolie), il Cavalier Bernino.

— Canto 3, octave 29
Translation:

And now, that I've shown you all,
It only remains to be said, who’s the famous sculptor
Of this great work, (and I bow
At his glory), Cavalier Bernini.

== The conclusion ==
Some time before, Meo had beaten up Calfurnia, a soothsayer, who had given him an answer to a dream, because he was not completely satisfied with her interpretation of the dream. Offended, Calfurnia decided to vindicate herself and get back at Meo so she plots to gossip to Nuccia about Meo. This induces another swordsman Marco Pepe to challenge Meo to a duel.

Meo overcomes Marco Pepe and wins the duel and Calfurnia is beaten up by Nuccia, amazed and incredulous as to Calpurnia's weakness. Now that he has become the head of a troupe of swordsmen, with banners and flags, he collects his fighters, and in the presence of the Roman crowd, makes peace with Nuccia. The Roman nobility furnishes him with equipment and means. As he is about to set off, news arrives that the siege of Vienna has been broken and even more, the Austrians have taken Buda in Hungary. So, although he is jealous that he has not had a share of the battle, Meo decides to open the celebrations with a grand show, fireworks and lights in Via del Corso:

Più ch'in ogn'altro loco, assai gustosa
Rescì 'sta festa in una strada ritta,
Longa un miglio, et in Roma assai famosa;
Pe' nominata antica, il Corzo è ditta.
Nel Carnevale è piena 'sta calcosa
Di gente così nobil, come guitta,
A diluvio le maschere ce vanno,
E la Curza, li Barbari ce fanno.

Translation:

More than in any other place, very funny
Was this party in that straight road,
A mile long, and in Rome very famous;
Since ancient times, Corso is how it's called.
During Carnival is full this one
Of people so noble, and so cheap,
Like rain the masks go there,
And the Race, the Barbarians run.

Note: the above is a pun, as Race (Corsa in Italian) sound like the feminine of Corso (meaning main street).

Another pun is in the last verse: the runners of the race which was held during Carnival were in reality not the "Barbari" ("Barbarians"), but the "Barberi" ("Berberian" horses, from north Africa).

When definitive news of a victory finally reaches Rome, there are more celebration. Meo acquits himself with valour from all the situations in which he finds himself and the poem ends with the wedding of Nuccia and Meo.

== Bibliography ==
- F. Onorati (edited by): Se chiama e se ne grolia, Meo Patacca. Giuseppe Berneri e la poesia romana fra Sei e Settecento, Roma, Centro Studi Giuseppe Gioachino Belli, 2004.
