= Mixed martial arts in Mexico =

- Country: Mexico
- Governing body: Federación de Artes Marciales Mixtas Equidad y Juego Limpio (FAMMEJL)
- National team: Mexico

Mixed martial arts in Mexico became very popular in the 2000s, being one of the fastest growing sports in that country.

== History ==
Traditional martial arts, from national ones such as lucha tarahumara (Tarahumara wrestling) to those from other places such as judo, have shaped MMA in Mexico, along with other combat sports such as boxing and taekwondo, in which the country has stood out considerably.

According to data recorded by the website Sherdog, one of the first MMA events held in the country was Reto Extremo 1, which took place on June 26, 1997, in Monterrey. The event featured nine fights, the main event being a bout between Miguel Reyes (who would later train Dominick Cruz) and Ricardo Flores, which ended with a knockout victory for Reyes.

In November 2014, the Ultimate Fighting Championship (UFC) would hold its first event on Mexican soil with UFC 180 at the Mexico City Arena. Tickets were sold out in just 8 hours, which is a record for the venue.

When the Ultimate Warrior Challenge Mexico ceased operations in 2015 and Xtreme Fighters Latino was in a state of irreversible decline, the idea arose to create a future MMA promotion in the country. This led to the birth of LUX Fight League in 2017, spearheaded by businessman Joe Mendoza, which over time became one of the fastest-growing promotions in the sport. LUX's first event, named LUX 001 and held on July 21, 2017, at the Hotel Posada in Tampico, was a resounding success.

== Organizations ==
The major MMA organizations in Mexico are LUX Fight League, Ultimate Warrior Challenge Mexico and Budo Sento Championship.

At the amateur level, The Federación de Artes Marciales Mixtas Equidad y Juego Limpio (lit. Federation of Mixed Martial Arts Equity and Fair Play), is the main governing body for the sport of MMA and the promotion of the sport in Mexico, supported and recognized by the International Mixed Martial Arts Federation (IMMAF). Its current president is Ubaldo Marroquin.

== Television ==
The UFC is the most widely watched organization, and its events are broadcast live on Fox Sports on cable television; and also for the UFC Fight Pass streaming service.
