= Harriet Korman =

American painter (born 1947)

- Born: 1947 (age 78–79); Bridgeport, Connecticut, United States
- Education: Queens College, Skowhegan School of Painting and Sculpture
- Known for: Painting, drawing
- Style: Abstract art
- Spouse: John Mendelsohn
- Awards: John S. Guggenheim Fellowship, American Academy of Arts and Letters, Pollock-Krasner Foundation, National Endowment for the Arts

Harriet Korman (born 1947) is an American abstract painter based in New York City, who first gained attention in the early 1970s. She is known for work that embraces improvisation and experimentation within a framework of self-imposed limitations that include simplicity of means, purity of color, and a strict rejection of allusion, illusion, naturalistic light and space, or other translations of reality. Writer John Yau describes Korman as "a pure abstract artist, one who doesn’t rely on a visual hook, cultural association, or anything that smacks of essentialization or the spiritual," a position he suggests few post-Warhol painters have taken. While Korman's work may suggest early twentieth-century abstraction, critics such as Roberta Smith locate its roots among a cohort of early-1970s women artists who sought to reinvent painting using strategies from Process Art, then most associated with sculpture, installation art and performance. Since the 1990s, critics and curators have championed this early work as unjustifiably neglected by a male-dominated 1970s art market and deserving of rediscovery.

Korman has exhibited at the Solomon R. Guggenheim Museum, Whitney Museum of American Art, Museo Rufino Tamayo and MoMA PS1, among other institutions. She has received a Guggenheim Fellowship and awards from the American Academy of Arts and Letters, Pollock-Krasner Foundation, and National Endowment for the Arts.

Harriet Korman, untitled, oil on canvas, 40" x 52", 2016.

== Early life and career ==
Korman was born in 1947 in Bridgeport, Connecticut. She studied art at the Skowhegan School of Painting and Sculpture and Queens College (BA, 1969), where she received a fairly traditional, observation-based education in painting. In her final year, however, she encountered the contemporary work of artists such as Agnes Martin, Robert Ryman and Lee Lozano, which shifted her focus toward a new painting language based on process and untethered to realistic observation or tradition.

After graduating, Korman shared a Lower East Side studio space with artists Gordon Matta-Clark and Charles Simonds and soon received recognition through exhibitions at The Institute of Art and Urban Resources (now MoMA PS1) and Guggenheim Museum ("10 Young Artists – Theodoron Awards") in 1971, a Whitney Annual (1972) and Biennial (1973), and a one-person exhibition at LoGiudice Gallery (1972).

In subsequent decades, Korman has had exhibitions at Galerie Ricke in Cologne; the Willard Gallery (1976–87), Lennon, Weinberg (1992–2019) and Thomas Erben Gallery in New York; Jancar Gallery (Los Angeles) and Daniel Weinberg Gallery (San Francisco and Los Angeles); Texas Gallery (Houston); and Häusler Contemporary (Munich), among others. She has also been included in the Whitney Biennial 1995, the international traveling exhibition, "High Times, Hard Times: New York Painting 1967-1975" (2006–8), and shows at the American Academy of Arts & Letters, National Academy Museum, and MoMA PS1.

In addition to her art career, Korman has taught in the Fine Arts Department at the Fashion Institute of Technology since 1989; she has also served on the faculties at Queens College and Virginia Commonwealth University. Korman lives and works in New York City with her husband, artist John Mendelsohn.

== Work and reception ==
Korman's work is consistent in terms of thought and inquiry rather than a signature style, motif, process or movement. She emerged in the wake of Minimalist and Conceptualist critiques of the painting tradition as "dead," but rejected them and embraced its legacy and limitations (e.g., the two-dimensional rectangle, flatness) as challenges. Her paintings employ frank, direct processes and often oscillate between fragmentation and wholeness, improvisation and structure. In her early series, Korman—and others such as Jennifer Bartlett, Louise Fishman, Mary Heilmann and Joan Snyder—sought to reduce mark-making and gesture to the essential in deceptively simple works. In subsequent work, she has experimented with livelier color, loose grids, geometries of interlocking shapes, and canvases with symmetrical subdivided formats, often based on drawings.

Harriet Korman, untitled, acrylic gesso and crayon on dyed canvas, 60" x 84", 1969.

=== Early process paintings ===
Korman's early paintings (1969–75) investigate subtle gestural problems and compositional means that break with modernist tradition, using predetermined processes of addition and subtraction and loose grid structures. Her first three New York solo exhibitions (1972–6) largely featured paintings in which she drew parallel lines, dots, dashes or numbers in crayon (sometimes forming shapes), covered them over with a layer of white gesso, and then scraped with emphatic, varying marks using a palette knife to bring together the two layers.

Reviewers described the resulting work as surprisingly compelling given her easily comprehended, simple method; in conceptual terms, they noted Korman's emphasis on arbitrariness and seeming nonchalance about the end product, which ran counter to the more heroic narratives of minimalism. Hilton Kramer described both an "appealing delicacy and purity" and pictorial insistency in Korman's spare forms (like stems and stitches) and pale, close-value colors, which recalled work by Agnes Martin and Eva Hesse; Roberta Smith wrote that Korman's work—denser, less taut, and more confident and inattentive—advanced Martin's, yielding "quietly radiant surfaces" that pulsate between fragility and robustness like breathing.

Harriet Korman, untitled, oil on canvas, 72" x 72", 1996.

=== Painting (1976–1996) ===
In 1976, Korman shifted to oil paints for greater flexibility and experimented with radically different directions, sometimes at the same time. Overall, her work of this period features livelier color, looser wet-on-wet brushwork and more raucous rhythms, which take forms ranging from uneven bands of color and free-form shapes to buckling grid patterns and loosely geometric shapes to gestural lines and scribbles. Stephen Westfall commended her experimentation in a review of her 1984 exhibition (Willard Gallery), which he described as a "surprisingly warm combination" of witty, slightly ragged touch, rigorous planarity and vivid, emotionally colored ideas.

Critics suggest Korman's late-1980s-to-early-1990s paintings circle back in style to refigure her past by turning the signature Minimalist grid into something loose and tactile, like textile design. She retained certain aspects—loose organizing principles and frankly evident processes—while introducing a vibrant palette, fleet paint application, and greater movement among styles. The paintings generally emerge from monochromatic grounds built of layered color, onto which Korman painted notational dashes, squares and wavy strokes of contrasting color that suggest gently disintegrating grids or plaids, thatches of grass or abstract calligraphy. Reviews most consistently commented on the work's controlled spontaneity, which Ken Johnson described as "operat[ing] in the gap between painterly hedonism and formal puritanism"; Holland Cotter compared the work to "a good dance performance" combining "skill with an instinctive grace." Between 1993 and 1996, Korman turned to mostly black, white and gray canvasses with askew grids and irregular, geometric "compartments" containing densely worked, calligraphic circles, diamonds, stripes, figure-eight and pretzel-like forms, and emblems.

=== Painting (1997–present) ===
Korman's black-and-white series provided insights that she applied to her next, color series: she would paint without white, which can create illusions of light and space. She presented the resulting paintings in exhibitions in 2001 and 2004 ("Line or Shape, Curved or Straight"), which feature richly hued, interlocking eccentric forms and unpredictable rhythmic patterns emerging from geometric swoops, curves and grids (e.g., Untitled, 2004; Can Be Joined Any Way, 2002). These paintings explore the way color and abstract images convey meaning. Critics described the work as "curiously out of time"—contemporary yet lightly echoing Miró, Kandinsky, Mondrian, and Tantric Art—and independent of nostalgia and ongoing discourses reviving or rejecting modernism.

Harriet Korman, untitled, oil on canvas, 36" x 48", 2004.

In her subsequent exhibition (Lennon, Weinberg, 2008) Korman exhibited paintings alongside the (black-and-white) line drawings that generated them for the first time. These paintings introduced wavering patches of grids and parallel lines—harkening back to early work—into her interlocking shapes, creating a sense of shifting configurations, like a kaleidoscope. John Yau wrote that this work upended two distinct strains of postwar abstraction by conflating "all-over" abstraction and a figure-ground approach, demonstrating continuing life in painting. Korman's next paintings—exhibited in 2012—were geometrically divided by diagonals, horizontals and verticals, the shapes then filled with unadulterated color, forming unexpected patterns and configurations. Deadpan compositions of triangles within grids of rectangles, they exposed intrinsic qualities of hue, brightness and transparency through color juxtapositions (e.g., Quadrant, 2012; Focus, 2011); artcritical's Deven Golden described them as purely objective works with luminous, subtly fluctuating surfaces and patterns that resembled a child's geometric coloring book.

In her next two exhibitions, Korman contemplated a basic problem—the division of a painting surface—finding freedom within the limitations of largely fixed, simple formats. For her 2014 show, "Line or Edge, Line or Color," she exhibited a suite of ten oil-stick drawings and ten paintings, built around the symmetrical format of a central diamond subdivided into rectangles or triangles and then complicated through her use of color. The paintings differ from preceding work by including areas of plain white paint and colored lines and outlines of varying width. A 2018 exhibition at Thomas Erben featured quadrant-based paintings with a central cross of colored lines and right-angled bands of chromatically rich color that suggest an update of Albers' Homage to the Square series.

Critics such as Raphael Rubenstein describe an "emphatically handmade" geometry of wavering edges, tapering bands and irregularities in these works, which pulls what appears to be strict modular abstraction (e.g., Albers or early Stella) into the realm of Paul Klee and Mary Heilmann. Other reviews attend to the improvisations, subtle shifts and unexpected jumps in this work—for example, variations between quadrants in the latter series, which disrupt the cruciform symmetry and resolution of the compositions as wholes; Roberta Smith wrote that the casually painted compositions "attest to the inexhaustibility of both color and geometry."

== Awards and public collections ==
Korman has been recognized with a John Simon Guggenheim Memorial Foundation Fellowship in Painting (2013) and grants from the Pollock-Krasner Foundation (2008), National Endowment for the Arts (1993, 1987, 1974), and New York Foundation for the Arts (1991). She has been awarded purchase prizes from the National Academy Museum, where she was elected to membership in 2006, the American Academy of Arts and Letters (2003), and the Solomon R. Guggenheim Museum (1971). She has also received artist residencies from the Edward F. Albee Foundation (1997) and Yaddo (1996).

Korman's work belongs to the public collections of the Solomon R. Guggenheim Museum, Museum for Modern Art (MMK) in Frankfort, Germany, Blanton Museum of Art, Jacksonville Museum of Modern Art, Joslyn Art Museum, Maier Museum of Art, McNay Art Museum, Orange County Museum of Art, Museum Pfalzgalerie (Germany), Tang Museum, and Weatherspoon Art Museum, among others.
