= Johan Van Mullem =

Johan Van Mullem (born 1959) is a Belgian artist living and working near Brussels. He is a painter and sculptor known mainly for his depiction of faces.

== Biography ==
Johan Van Mullem was born in Congo in 1959 to Belgian parents. He grew up moving around the world as a result of his parents' various diplomatic postings, including a seven years stay in Tunisia.

Johan has always been an autodidact. He started drawing at the age of five and never stopped since then; same as his father and grandfather. His family roots are in the city of Bruges.

Later on Johan began exploring etching and painting. Today he paints with etching ink; he is probably one of the only artist using this medium.

At University he studied architecture.

His paintings are in major private collections and museum collections throughout Europe. He has held solo exhibitions in art galleries located in London, Paris, New York and Brussels. His work was exhibited in various European museums.

== Career ==
=== Solo shows ===
2010

- Chapelle de Boondael, Brussels (BEL)
- Kunstgalerij Anarto, Antwerp (BEL)

2011

- Arthus Gallery, Brussels (BEL)

2012

- "Movements of the Soul", Andipa gallery London (GB)

2013

- "Rebirth", Hus Gallery London (GB)

2014

- "Meta Morphoses", Macadam Gallery, Brussels (BEL)
- C24 Gallery, New York (USA)

2015

- « Face à Face », Galerie Schwab Beaubourg Paris (FR)
- « Fiat LUX », HUS Gallery London (UK)

2016

- Galerie DUCHOZE Contemporain, Rouen (FR)
- Galerie Espace B, Glabais, (BE)
- « De Anima », The Unit London Gallery, London, (UK)

2017

- Loo & Lou Gallery Paris (FR) « 3 Espaces, 3 Univers »
- Musée d'Ixelles, Bruxelles (BE)

2018

- MACM Musée de Mougins (France)

=== Group shows ===
2010

- ART GALLERY 826, Knokke-le-Zoute, (BEL)
- Été Contemporain Dracenois à Draguignan, (FR)
- Lineart Art Fair, Gand, (BEL)

2011

- London Art Fair, (GB) with Hus Gallery London Gallery
- Show in Monte Carlo organised by Galerie SEM-ART Monaco

2012

- Show in Gstaad,(CH) with Hus Gallery London
- Istanbul Art Fair (TRQ) with Andipa Gallery London

2013

- BRAFA Art Fair Brussels (BEL), with Sem-Art Gallery Monaco

2014

- São Paulo Int' Art Fair (BRA) with Hus Gallery London
- Dallas Art Fair (USA) with Hus Gallery London

2015

- ST'ART Art Fair, Strasbourg (FR) with Macadam Gal. (BEL)
- « Mosaïques » Show, Troyes (FR), Curator Noorbergen
- "Kunst in de Kantfabriek" show, Vilvoorde, (BEL)
- Dallas Art Fair, (USA) with 10 Hanover Gallery London (UK)
- - «Paysages contemporains », Gal. Schwab Beaubourg Paris (FR)
- ART'UP Lille Art Fair, (FR) with Macadam Gallery (BEL)

2016

- « Créations Belges », Mazel Galerie, Brussels (BE)
- Yia Art Fair Brussels (BE) with Mazel Galerie
- « This is not a Landscape » Show, PAK, Gistel (BEL)
- « Drawings Rooms #2 » Show, PAK, Gistel (BEL)

2017

- Musée National des Beaux-Arts de Kaunas (Lithuanie)
- Art Paris Art Fair with Loo & Lou Gallery Paris
- MACM Museum Mougins, part of the permanent Exhibition
- "Abstract Ed.#1 & #2, Aeroplastics Gallery, Brussels

2025-26

- "Vestiges du désordre", Deletaille Gallery presenting at Ceramic Brussels Fair, Brussels
