= City Limits Barbeque =

Coordinates: 33.9802°N 81.1182°W

- Interactive map of City Limits Barbeque

Restaurant information
- Established: 2016
- Owner: Robbie Robinson
- Food type: Texas barbecue South Carolina barbecue
- Location: 1119 Methodist Park Road, West Columbia, South Carolina

City Limits Barbeque is a barbecue restaurant in South Carolina. It is known for serving South Carolina-style and Texas-style barbecue.

== Description ==
The restaurant is only open on weekends and serves a rotating menu of barbecue dishes. On Saturdays, it serves food from Texas-style and South Carolina-style barbecue. Its menu includes barbecue brisket, beef ribs, pulled pork, and desserts. On Sundays, its menu focuses on hot dogs, sausages and sides, including chili dogs.

== History ==
The restaurant was founded by pitmaster Robbie Robinson as a food truck in 2016 before being moved into a restaurant in 2023. In 2024, Robinson was nominated for a James Beard Foundation Award. That year, it was included on The New York Times "Best Restaurant" list. In 2025, the restaurant was ranked as #1 on Southern Living's list of the best barbecue restaurants in the South.
