= City Limits (painting) =

1969 painting by Phillip Guston

- Artist: Philip Guston
- Year: 1969
- Medium: Oil on canvas
- Dimensions: 195.6 cm × 262.2 cm (6 ft 5 in × 8 ft 7.25 in)
- Location: Museum of Modern Art, New York

City Limits is an oil on canvas painting by Phillip Guston, from 1969. It is held at the Museum of Modern Art, in New York.

== History and description ==
It is part of his “hoods” series of representational works. These paintings depicted cartoonish versions of Klansmen engaged in various mundane activities. While other works in this series (i.e. The Studio) featured the artist himself under the guise of a KKK member, City Limits provides a more straightforward depiction. The child-like presentation has been described as enabling “a simple account of the simple-mindedness of violence.” It is influenced by his early work with Mexican Muralists and was part of his polarizing abandonment of Abstract Expressionism as a genre at his 1970 Marlborough Gallery exhibition. It is featured in Philip Guston Now, a traveling retrospective that generated controversy when it was postponed in 2020.
