= Gary Komarin =

American artist (born 1951)

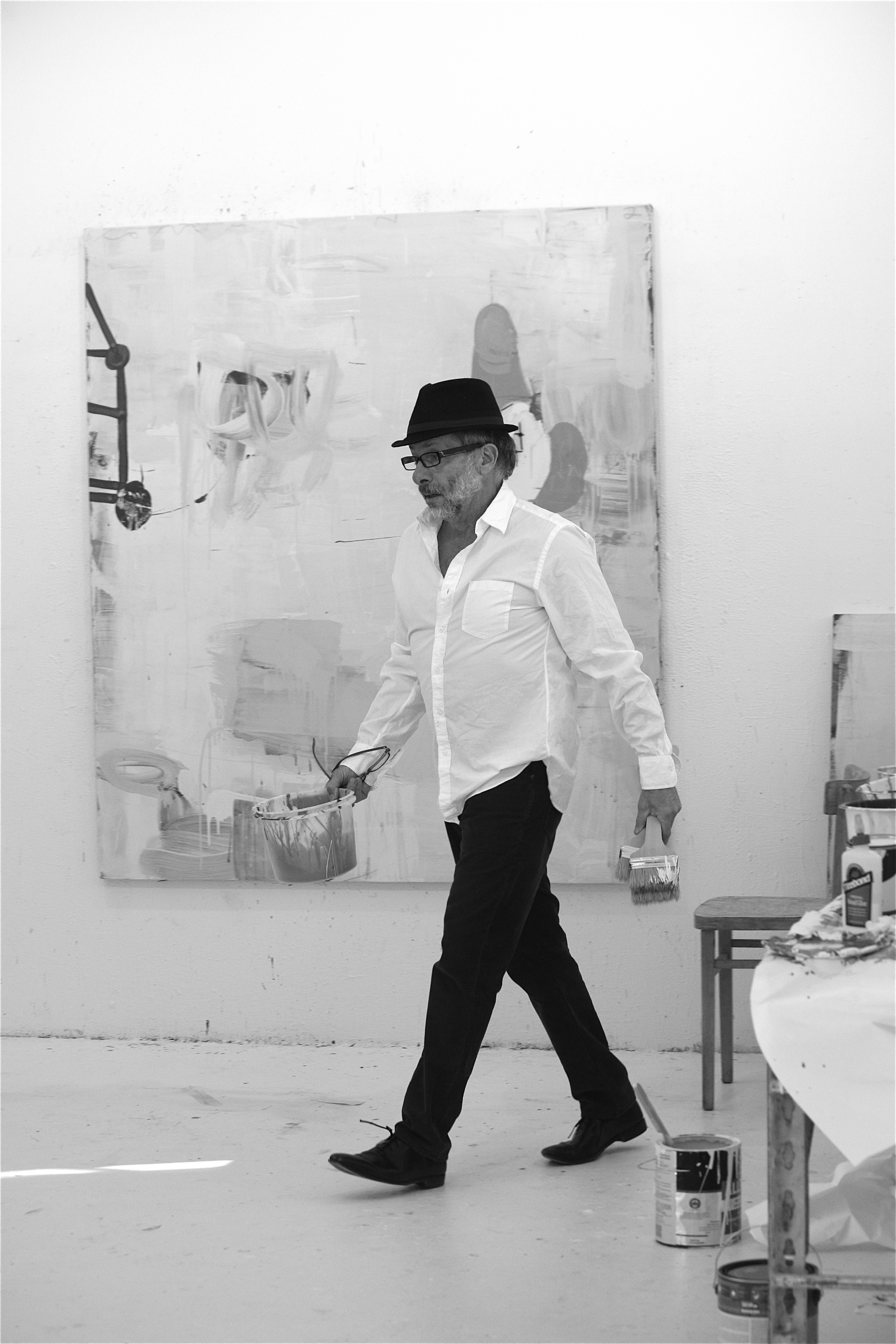
- Born: September 14, 1951 (age 74); New York City, New York
- Known for: Painting
- Movement: Post-painterly Abstraction
- Awards: Joan Mitchell Prize in Painting, the New York Foundation for the Arts Grant in Painting, the Edward Albee Foundation Fellowship in Painting, the Elizabeth Foundation, the New York Prize in Painting and the Benjamin Altman Prize from the National Academy of Design Museum, New York.

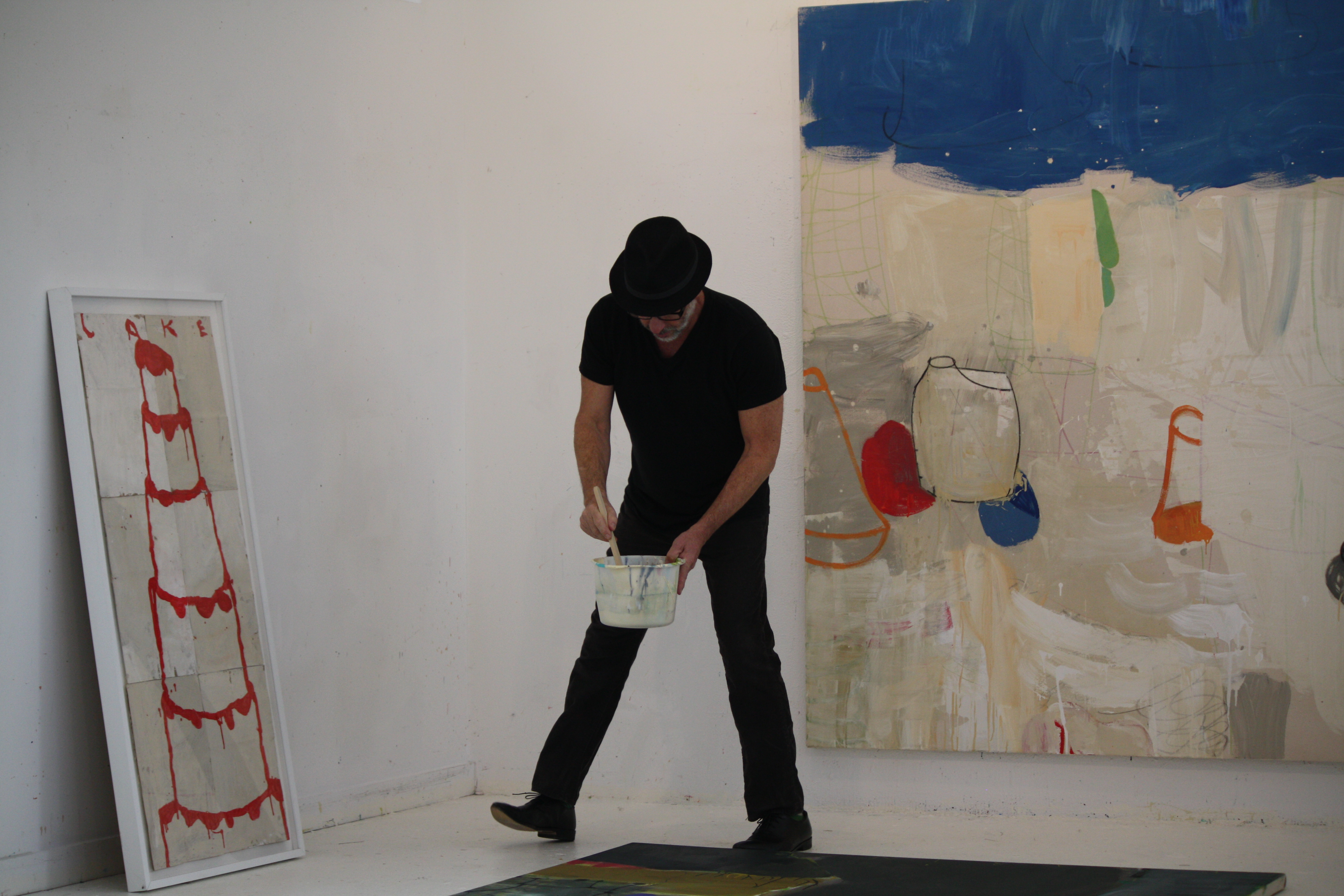
Gary Komarin painting in his Roxbury CT studio

The Caretaker's Cottage, 2014, oil on canvas, 72" × 62"

Gary Komarin (born September 14, 1951) is an American artist known for his abstract work. His art is characterized by spontaneous mark-making, figuration, and painterly expression. Komarin's work is associated with post-painterly abstraction.

== Early life and education ==
Gary Komarin was born in New York City in 1951, the son of a Czech architect and an Austrian writer. He studied at Albany State University, where he earned a bachelor's degree in Art and English Literature. After completing his undergraduate studies, Komarin attended Boston University, where he received a master's degree with a focus on fine arts. While at Boston University, he studied under artist Philip Guston and held a year-long graduate teaching fellowship, which concluded in 1977.

== Career and work ==
Komarin's work is associated with post-painterly abstraction and abstract expressionism. He often uses unconventional materials such as drop cloths, industrial canvas tarps, and brown paper bags instead of traditional artist canvases. His painting technique includes mixing water-based house paint with spackle and water to create hybrid matte colors, alongside other mixed media materials. In a 2004 interview with The New York Times, Komarin was quoted as saying, "If I were stuck in the studio with just brown and white paint and a box of dried oatmeal, I'd figure out something I could do with them."

Describing Komarin's process in her essay for the 2012 catalog "The Road to Dialoro", Carol Diehl writes:

"For most artists there is no eureka moment; instead ideas develop through practice and over time, one thing leading to the next, and Gary Komarin is particularly sensitive to this intuitive process. If his marks appear awkward and childlike, it's because he has learned over the years how to turn off his internal critic and work from a place of detachment that allows for freshness, newness, and authenticity. Komarin has built into his working method ways of keeping himself from over-thinking or becoming too precious — techniques that allow him to get out of the way and almost let the painting paint itself."

== Selected exhibitions ==
As of 2024, Komarin has exhibited internationally, with shows in North America, South America, Europe, and Asia. Notable exhibitions include a 2008 solo museum exhibition of large-scale canvases, Moon Flows like a Willow, at the Musée Kiyoharu Shirakaba in Japan, organized by the Yoshii Foundation in Tokyo, along with galleries in New York, Tokyo, and Paris. He participated in a four-person exhibition at McEnroe Gallery, 41 Greene Street, in New York alongside Jean-Michel Basquiat, Philip Guston, and Bill Traylor, in 1996. He has also been featured alongside Robert Motherwell and Larry Poons in a 2012 exhibition essay States of Feeling written by John Daly.

In 2008, Komarin exhibited a large cake painting at the Katonah Museum of Art in Katonah, New York. This catalog exhibition was titled: ‘Here's the Thing: The Single Object Still Life,” curated by Robert Cottingham. Komarin's work was shown alongside works by Andy Warhol, Christo, Claes Oldenburg, Richard Diebenkorn, Philip Guston, and others. Komarin's work has also been included in curated group shows in New York, Dubai, and Zurich alongside works by Willem de Kooning, Mark Rothko, Jeff Koons, Yves Klein, and Joan Miró. Komarin has also exhibited in catalog exhibitions in New York, Bogota, Zurich, Dubai, Paris, Palm Beach, Houston, San Francisco, Denver, Assisi, and London in the past decade.

In 2020, Komarin had a solo exhibition at the Dado Museum in Seoul, Korea. This followed a solo exhibition at the Azjuelo Museum and inclusion in an exhibition titled "Kinesis" at the Neon Gallery in London.

== Selected collections ==
Komarin's work is held in various public and private collections globally. These include museums such as the Galleria Nazionale d’Arte Moderna, Rome; The Museum of Fine Arts, Houston; The Museum South Texas, Corpus Christi; the Museum of Contemporary Art San Diego; the Denver Art Museum; The Crocker Museum of Art, Sacramento; Museum of Modern Art, Bogota; the Montclair Art Museum; the Newark Museum; the Boise Art Museum; the Zimmerli Museum; the Arkansas Museum of Contemporary Art; Boston University Museum of Fine Arts; the Yoshii Foundation, Tokyo; the Musee Kiyoharu Shirakaba, Japan; and the Musee Mougins, France.

Corporate collections holding his work include Microsoft Corporation, Blount International, the United Bank of Houston, United Airlines, the Hyatt Corporation, AT&T, and American Airlines.

== Awards and recognition ==
Komarin has received several awards, fellowships, and grants during his career. While studying at Boston University from 1975 to 1977 he completed a one year long graduate teaching fellowship under Philip Guston. In 1999, he received the Painters and Sculptors Grant from the Joan Mitchell Foundation for his submission of his work including Trapeze, Vessel, Siwah, Incident at Echo Lake, and The Egyptian Hat Trick. The Edward T. Albee Foundation chose him as an Albee Fellow in 2000 as a part of The Barn program.

== Publications and media coverage ==
Komarin has been interviewed and featured in many different publications including The New York Times, Art in America, The San Francisco Chronicle, Arts Magazine, and L’Officiel Austria

== Influences ==
Komarin has cited the New York School, and especially his teacher Philip Guston at Boston University, as major influences on his artistic development. According to a New York Times article by Barry Schwabsky, “Guston's lesson in cultivating the unknown has clearly stuck with Mr. Komarin. And on a more superficial level, the teacher's peculiar sense of form can also still be traced in his former student's work – in the way Mr. Komarins' bulbous forms can seem to echo, in an abstract way, the cigars, cyclopean heads, and naked light bulbs in Guston's paintings.”

== Exhibitions ==
Year	Exhibition	Location
2025	The Geometry of Love, Mariam Diehl Gallery	Jackson, Wyoming
2025	Arc & Iliad, Blond Contemporary Gallery	London, England
2025	The Open Palm of Desire, Graham Taylor Fine Arts	Johannesburg, South Africa
2025	A Suite of Blue Sea, Gallerie Baobob	Bogota, Colombia
2024	Landscape with a Cup, Azulejo Gallery	Seoul, Korea
2023 and 2024	Blond Contemporary	London
2023	Gail Severn Gallery	Sun Valley Idaho
2023	Laura Rathe Gallery	Houston, TX
October/December 2022	Punch Drunk Love, Azujelo Gallery	Seoul, South Korea
October/November 2022	The Search for Pure Meaning, Azujelo Gallery	Seoul, South Korea
August 2022	Art Of Paper, Laura Rathe Fine Art	Houston, Texas
July 2022	The Open Palm of Desire, New Works on Canvas and Paper, Tsivikros Shake Gallery	London, UK
June/July 2022	Surreal Summer, Madelyn Jordan Gallery	New York, NY
2020	Kinesis, Neon Gallery. Curated by Christopher Shake.	London, UK
2012	Pavillon des Art et du Design with Galerie Jean-Francois Cazeau	Paris, France
2012	Palm Springs Fine Art Fair with Elins Eagles-Smith Gallery	Palm Springs, California
2011	Contemporary and Modern Masters, Jean-Francois Cazeau	Paris, France
