= Female Artists of Mougins Museum =

Coordinates: 43°36′04″N 6°59′45″E

- Femmes Artistes Musée Mougins
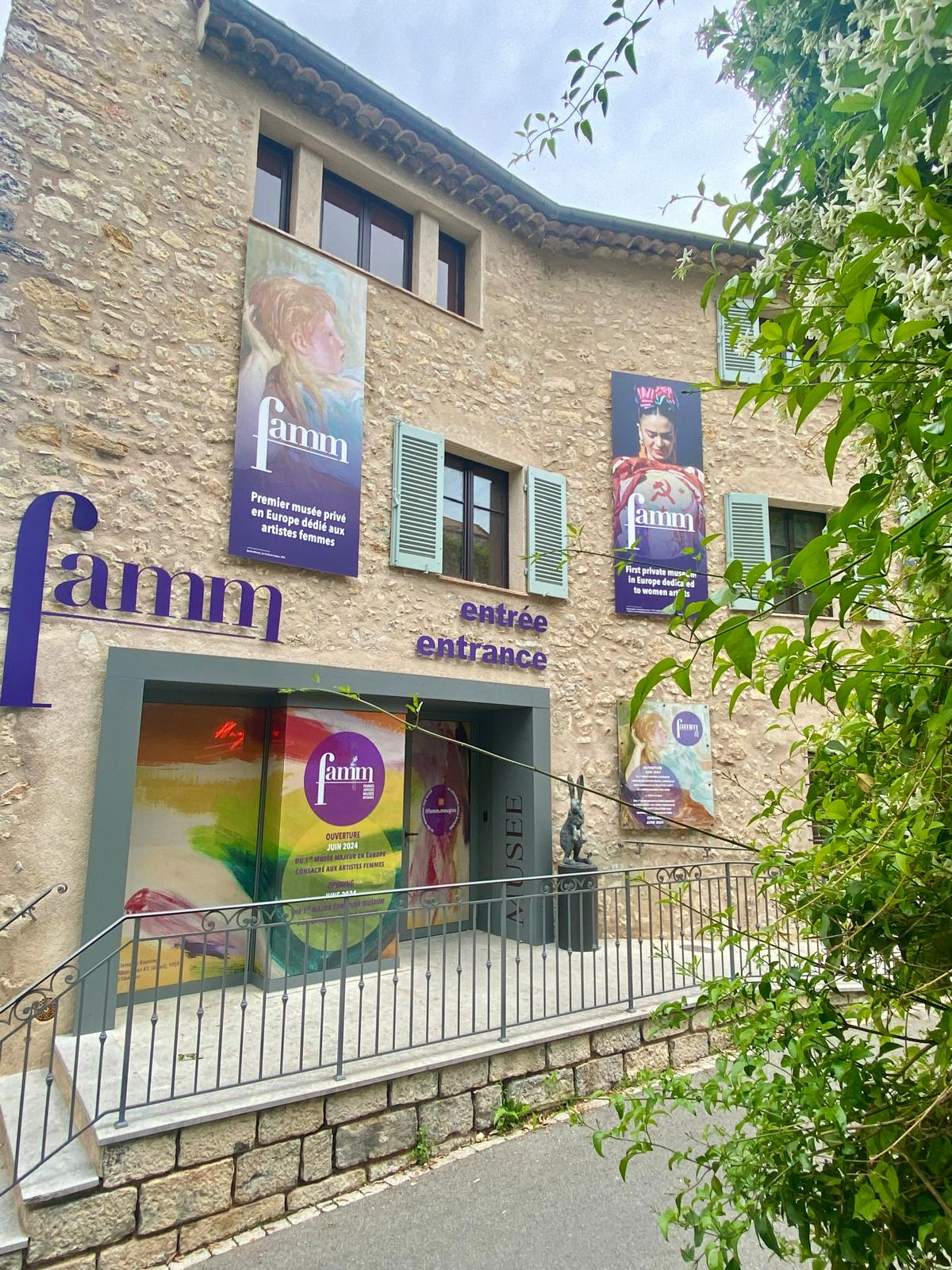
- The front of the Female Artists of the Mougins Museum
- Established: June 2024
- Location: 32, rue Commandeur / 06250 Mougins, France
- Type: Private art museum
- Founder: Christian Levett
- Director: Leisa Paoli
- Website: Official site

The Female Artists of Mougins Museum (Note: Sometimes written as the "Female Artists of the Mougins Museum" by official material in English.) (FAMM) is a private art museum located in Mougins, Provence, France, near Cannes. Dedicated exclusively to female artists, it showcases a collection of over 100 artworks by approximately 80 artists from across the globe. The collection spans major artistic movements, from Impressionism to Contemporary art.

The museum was founded by Christian Levett at the former grounds of the Mougins Museum of Classical Art in June 2024.

== History ==
The transformation of the Mougins Museum of Classical Art into FAMM in 2023 was largely driven by its founder, Christian Levett. A former British investment manager, Levett developed the original museum in 2011 to juxtapose classical artifacts with modern art, but moved to a female-oriented collection due to the significantly lower cost of acquiring female-created art and the unprofitability of the previous museum. Levett noted in an interview that the previous museum was very unprofitable, and that he hoped the new female-focused museum would be more popular and appreciate the value of his own personal collection.

Inspired by installations such as the National Museum of Women in the Arts in Washington, D.C., FAMM's mission is to celebrate the contributions of female artists in the "birth of modern art," according to Levett.

== Artists and exhibitions ==
Blanche Hoschedé-Monet's Le petit point de Giverny was exhibited at the FAMM in 2026.

FAMM's collection spans a range of artistic movements, which are organized by into sections. Overall the pieces cover a timeframe between 1870 and the present day.

The ground floor showcases Impressionist works by Berthe Morisot, Mary Cassatt, and Eva Gonzalès, among others. While their work was exhibited in their time, they have become largely unknown.

Also featured are Surrealist works by Aube Elléouët, Frida Kahlo, Leonor Fini, and Leonora Carrington. Founder Christian Levett has remarked that he believes Surrealist art by women of the period to be "equivalent, if not better than the men." Art by Leonor Fini was added into the permanent collection during a 2026 rehang.

Elsewhere, the museum includes pieces of the Abstract expressionism movement, such as those by Lee Krasner, Joan Mitchell, and Helen Frankenthaler.

The museum also displays sculptures by Louise Bourgeois and Marina Abramović. Contemporary artists such as Tracey Emin, Sarah Lucas, and Jenny Saville are part of the evolving collection.

== Reception ==
Near the time of its opening, FAMM received widespread media attention from several publications, including Le Parisien, The Times, and Harper's Bazaar.
