= Private art museum =

Art museums can be established as either public or private entities. Private art museums are often founded by high-net-worth art collectors in order to share their personal collection with the public. The rise of private art museums in the 21st century has "coincided with rapid growth in personal wealth worldwide and the desire to build and leave a legacy for the local community and future generations."

== History ==
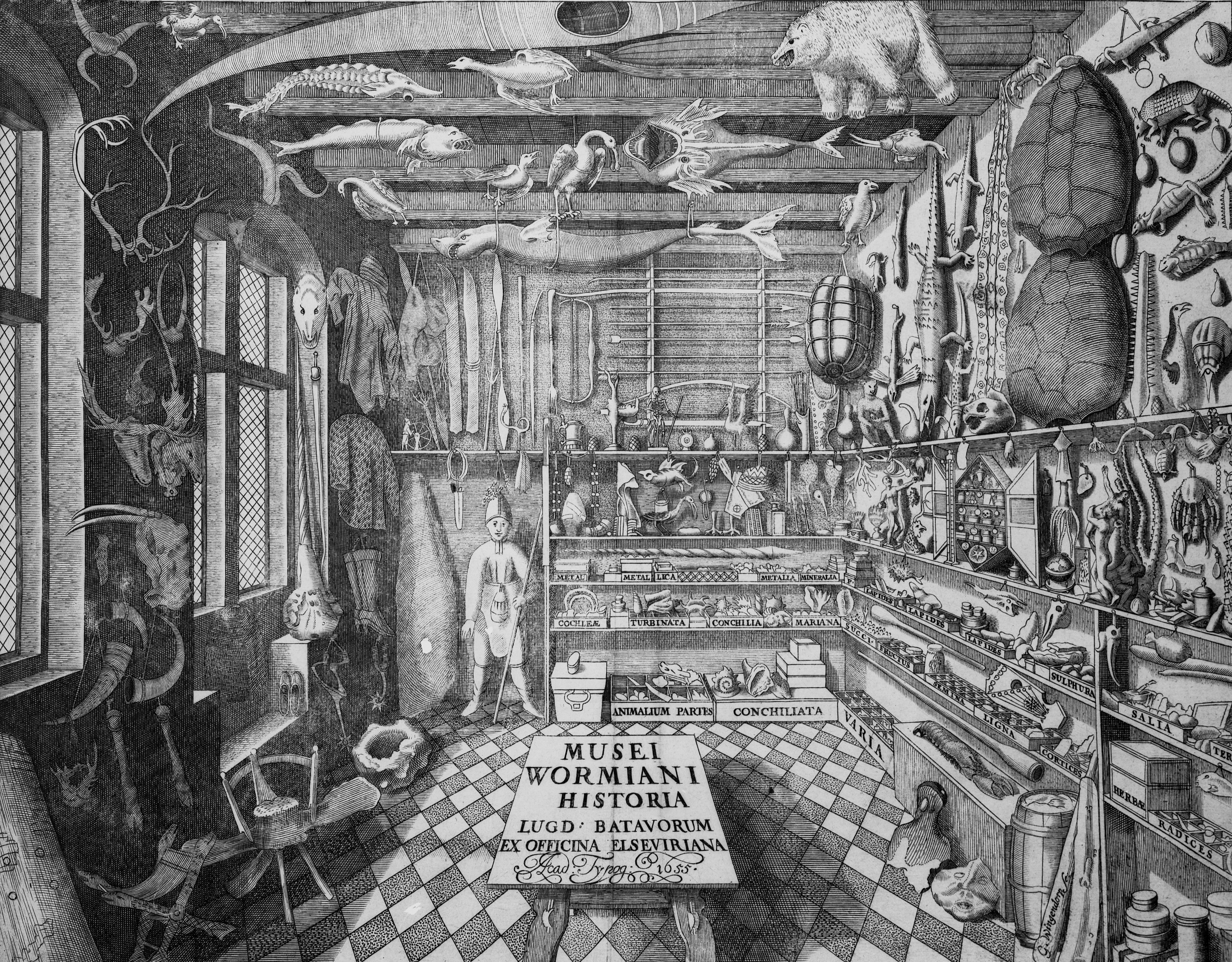
"Musei Wormiani Historia", the frontispiece from the Museum Wormianum depicting Ole Worm's cabinet of curiosities

In early Renaissance Europe, Wunderkammern (cabinets of art and marvels) were assembled by wealthy merchants and ruling families to display their collections of art and artifacts. After cabinets of curiosities fell out of fashion in the late 1800's, what prevailed were public displays of art by royal families such as the Medicis of Italy. The Medici family was one of the wealthiest in Europe and had the means and power to directly commission works from Leonardo da Vinci, Michelangelo and Raphael and build one of the largest collections of paintings and sculpture in the world.

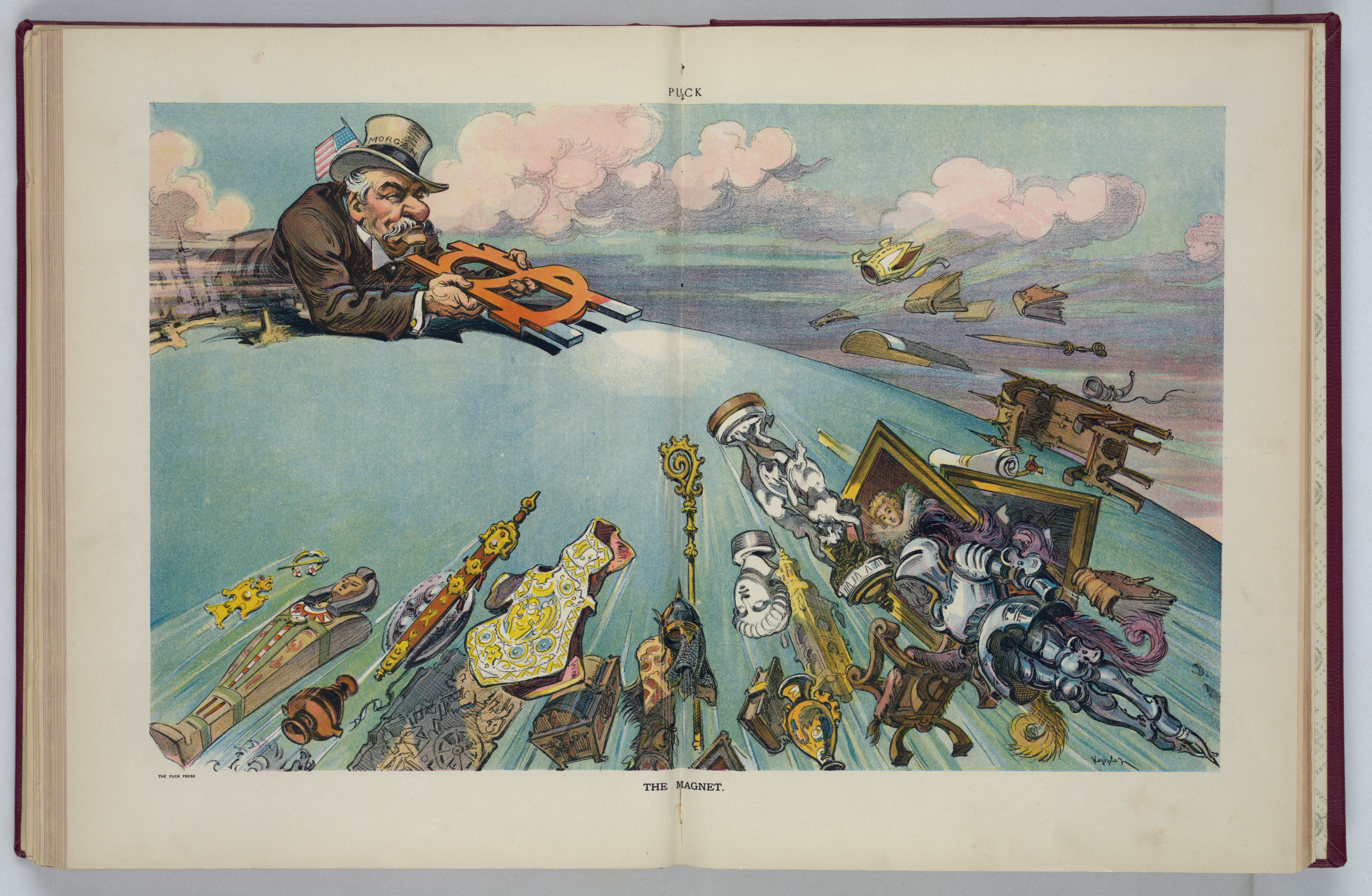
Cartoon of J.P. Morgan The Magnet by Udo Keppler, 1911 - Library of Congress, Prints and Photographs Division

In America, newly wealthy industrialists of the Gilded Age traveled to Europe to acquire art that noblemen and royal families had been collecting for centuries. Jay Gould, Henry Clay Frick, Andrew W. Mellon and J.P. Morgan amassed large collections of art and "their purchases were either put immediately on public view in buildings they themselves helped endow, or into private collections that would ultimately be made available to the public." In the last two decades of his life, J.P. Morgan spent $900 million (in today's dollars) on art. Other collectors who founded private art museums during the first decades of the 20th century include Isabella Stewart Gardener (Isabella Stewart Gardener Museum), William T. Walters (The Walters Art Museum) and John and Mabel Ringling (The Ringling Museum of Art).

== Private art museums today ==
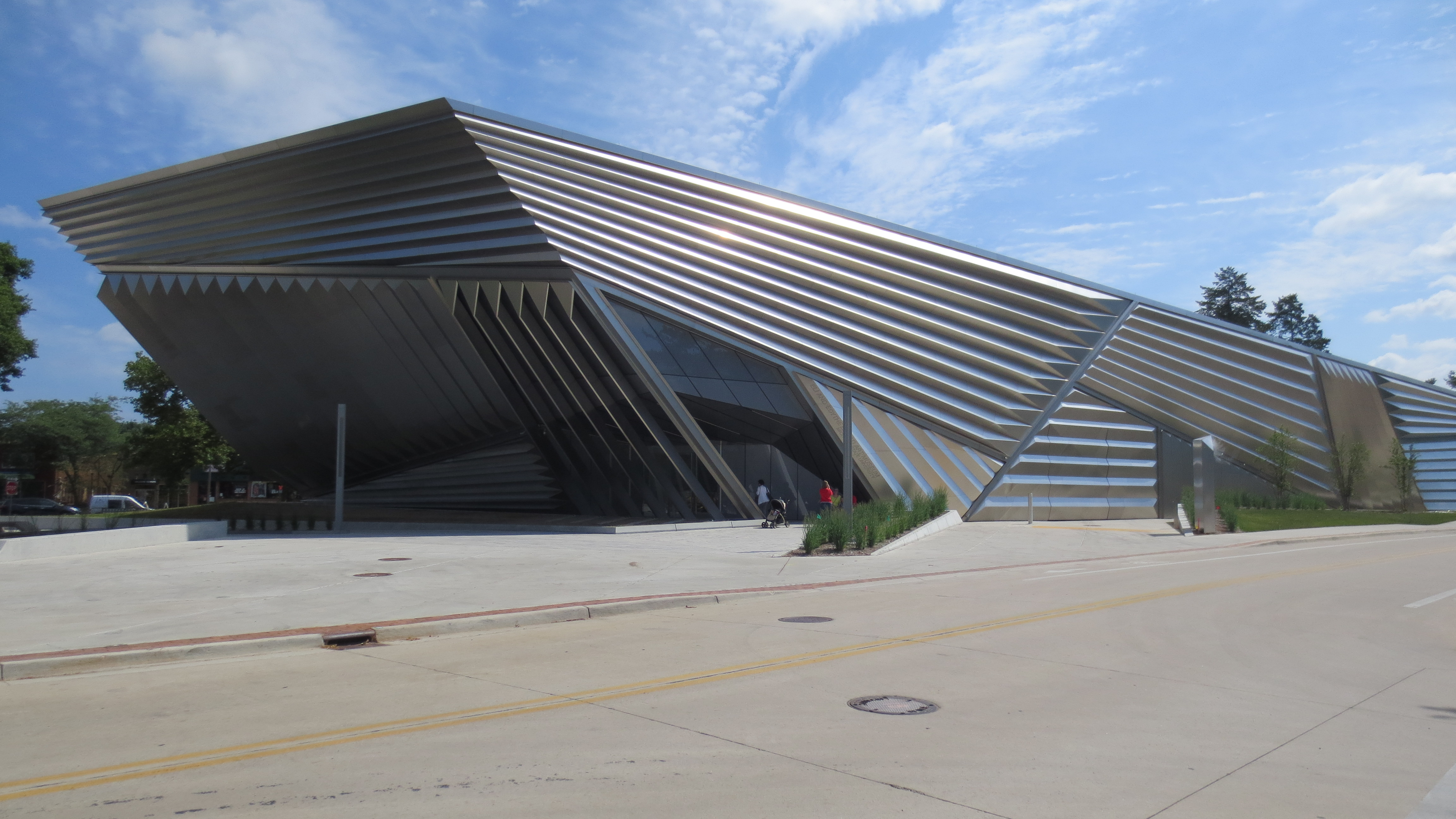
Eli and Edythe Broad Art Museum - Los Angeles

Private art museums today are often the personal art collection of an individual or couple who want to keep their collection intact, control how it is exhibited and share it with the public. Private collectors may choose to establish private museums over donating their collections to public institutions.

Hundreds of private art museums populate the globe in locations ranging from Paris to the Arctic Circle, with more than 70 percent of them opening since the year 2000. They display artwork that otherwise might not be accessible to the public and many offer lectures, academic programs, artist's residencies and cultural events. As reported in 2016 by the art market knowledge company, Larry's List, "The quality of artworks displayed and the shows curated rival or even surpass institutional exhibitions, often being recognized not only locally but on an international art level, especially in the field of contemporary art. The number of visitors attending private museums often equals public institutions."

== See also ==
- Private collection
- Private museum
