= Federación de Artes Marciales Mixtas Equidad y Juego Limpio =

Sports governing body in Mexico

Federation of Mixed Martial Arts Equity and Fair Play
- Federación de Artes Marciales Mixtas Equidad y Juego Limpio
- Sport: Mixed martial arts
- Jurisdiction: Mexco
- Abbreviation: FAMM-EJL (or FAMM)
- Founded: 2016
- Affiliation: IMMAF
- President: Ubaldo "Zorro" Marroquín

The Federación de Artes Marciales Mixtas Equidad y Juego Limpio ("Federation of Mixed Martial Arts Equity and Fair Play") is the governing body for mixed martial arts (MMA) in Mexico. The FAMM is responsible for promoting the development of MMA at both the amateur and professional levels throughout the country. It is affiliated with the International Mixed Martial Arts Federation (IMMAF).

The federation was founded in mid-2016 with the following main objectives: to consolidate all forces associated with the development of mixed martial arts in Mexico, to form a united national federation with a wide network of branches in the regions, and to put order in the rules of competitions and the training methods of athletes and referees. In 2017, FAMM was endorsed by the CONADE.

The current president is former MMA fighter Ubaldo "El Zorro" Marroquín.
