= Margot Peet =

American painter (1903–1995)

Marguerite Munger Peet
- Born: Marguerite Munger; June 8, 1903; Kansas City, Missouri, US
- Died: April 21, 1995 (aged 91); Shawnee, Kansas, US
- Education: Kansas City Art Institute
- Known for: Painting
- Movement: American Regionalism
- Spouse: Herbert O. Peet

Marguerite "Margot" Munger Peet (1903–1995) was an American painter. She did not have a far-reaching artistic reputation during her lifetime as she often did not exhibit her work in public. Her family found over 430 of her paintings after her death, and she has been the subject of three major retrospectives in the last 15 years. Her most significant work was created under the tutelage of famed American Regionalist painter Thomas Hart Benton.

== Early life ==
Margot Peet was born in Kansas City, Missouri in 1903, and grew up in a prosperous merchant family that encouraged her interest in art. Her father, Williston Penfield Munger, was the owner of a local wholesale dry goods company. She attended The Barstow School, a school exclusive for girls in Kansas City. Peet's aunt Ruth Bohan was an artist who worked as an art instructor at Barstow while Peet attended. After graduation, she attended Emma B. Hopkins French finishing school in New York City, where she received her first formal art training.

== Painting career ==
At 18 years old, the young Margot Munger was sent to the Miss Emma B. Hopkins school, also known as the French House, a finishing school in New York City, despite having dreams of attending Smith College in Northampton, Massachusetts. It was at this time that she also received her first formal artistic training. She took portraiture lessons with Clinton Peters of Baltimore, who held classes in a New York studio on Broadway.

Peet began later intermittent studies at the Kansas City Art Institute in the 1920s. Her maternal aunt, Ruth Harris Bohan, was an accomplished oil painter who became an early role model. In the fall of 1935, when she was married with two small children at home, Peet enrolled in painting classes taught by the famous Regionalist painter, Thomas Hart Benton at the Art Institute, where she also studied with Randall Davey and Ernest Lawson. Under Benton's guidance, she produced her first multi-figural compositions, her first genre scenes, and her first paintings in egg tempera, a quick-drying medium using egg yolk as the binder. Benton painted in class alongside his students who produced "versions" of his subjects from slightly different angles. In 1939, Margot Peet painted a small version of Benton's iconic allegorical nude, Persephone, which is now one of the highlights of the American painting collection at the Nelson-Atkins Museum of Art in Kansas City. Her painting Do Unto Others is a version of Benton's well-known work, Instruction, which he painted as part of an Art Institute class in 1940. Peet's work produced during this period is now viewed as her best. Benton selected a still life painting by Peet for an exhibition of his students' work that was held at the Associated American Artists Gallery in New York City. Peet exhibited at the Midwest Artists' Exhibition in 1927, 1936, 1937 and 1942. In the 1936 Midwestern Artists' Exhibition her painting Culture received an Honorable Mention in the Kansas City Artists' category. For the remainder of her life, she continued to paint garden still lifes, flower pieces and portraits.

Peet is included in the list of artists at Missouri Remembers: Artists in Missouri through 1951.

Much of Peet's work was discovered in storage in her home after her death in 1995. This trove included 430 paintings, watercolors and pastels. In 1993, some of Peet's paintings were featured in the exhibit, Under the Influence: The Students of Thomas Hart Benton, at The Albrecht-Kemper Museum of Art in St. Joseph, Missouri. Since her death in 1995 and the subsequent discovery of many unknown paintings, she has been the subject of two major retrospectives: With Grace & Wit: The Paintings of Margot Peet, 1903-1995 at the Johnson County Museum of History in 1999, and Margot Munger Peet, 1903-1995, The Barstow School Exhibit, in 2004. A full length art historical biography of Peet, Discovering Margot Peet: The Artist and the Art World of Kansas City was published in 2010.

== Philanthropy ==
Peet was involved with multiple organizations in the Kansas City area, including the Westport Garden Club, an investment club, The Beautification Committee for Mission Hills, the Jewel Ball, Kansas City Art Institute, The Nelson-Atkins Museum of Art and Planned Parenthood. Her affiliation with Planned Parenthood started in New York in 1916. The Peets made the first substantial gift to the organization in 1956, and she joined the board that year, continuing to serve for nearly 20 years. Notable contributions made by Mrs. Peet to the Nelson-Atkins Museum of Art can be found in both the art collection and the Spencer Art Reference Library collections.

== Personal life ==
Margot Munger returned to Kansas City in 1922, and in 1924, she married Herbert O. Peet, a Princeton graduate whose family owned Peet Brothers' Company, the largest soap company west of the Mississippi River. The couple had two daughters, Marguerite, born in 1925, and Jeannette in 1931.

Margot Peet enjoyed a rich family life as a wife and mother to her two daughters. The Peets were an upper-class family with a full-time staff to assist in the running of the house and raising of the children. Art was ever present in her home and family life as she continued to create. She often could be found painting her own paper dolls for her daughters and friends to adorn with their own tabbed paper dresses. Her artistic talents extended to the kitchen, as she was described as a brilliant cook. Margot had a wide array of friends, including Ernest Hemingway, who made references to her in his work.

== Sources ==
- Discovering Margot Peet: The Artist and the Art World of Kansas City. Marianne Berardi and Henry Adams. Posterity Press. 2010
- The Artists Bluebook. Lonnie Pierson Dunbar, editor. March 2005.
- Under the Influence: The Students of Thomas Hart Benton. Marianne Berardi. The Albrecht-Kemper Museum of Art. 1993
- With Grace & Wit: The Paintings of Margot Peet, 1903–1995. Johnson County Museum of History. 1999.
- Margot Munger Peet, 1903–1995, The Barstow School Exhibit. 2004
- Davenport's Art Reference. Ray Davenport. 2005.
- Who Was Who in American Art. Peter Hastings Falk (editor). 1999
- Women Artists in America. Jim L. Collins. 1973
- Who's Who in American Art. Charlotte Ball (editor). 1940.
- Kansas City Regional Art. Associated American Artists. New York. 1940
- "Women Artists in the Moffett Collection", American Art Review. By Cori Sherman North. February 2006
- "Margot Peet, 1903-1995". American Art Review. By Marianne Berardi. August 1999.
- With Grace & Wit: The Paintings of Margot Peet, 1903-1995
- Missouri Remembers: Artists in Missouri through 1951
- https://kcindependent.com/a-toast-to-olde-tymes-marguerite-munger-peet/
