= Jack Edward Barber =

American artist (1918–2003)

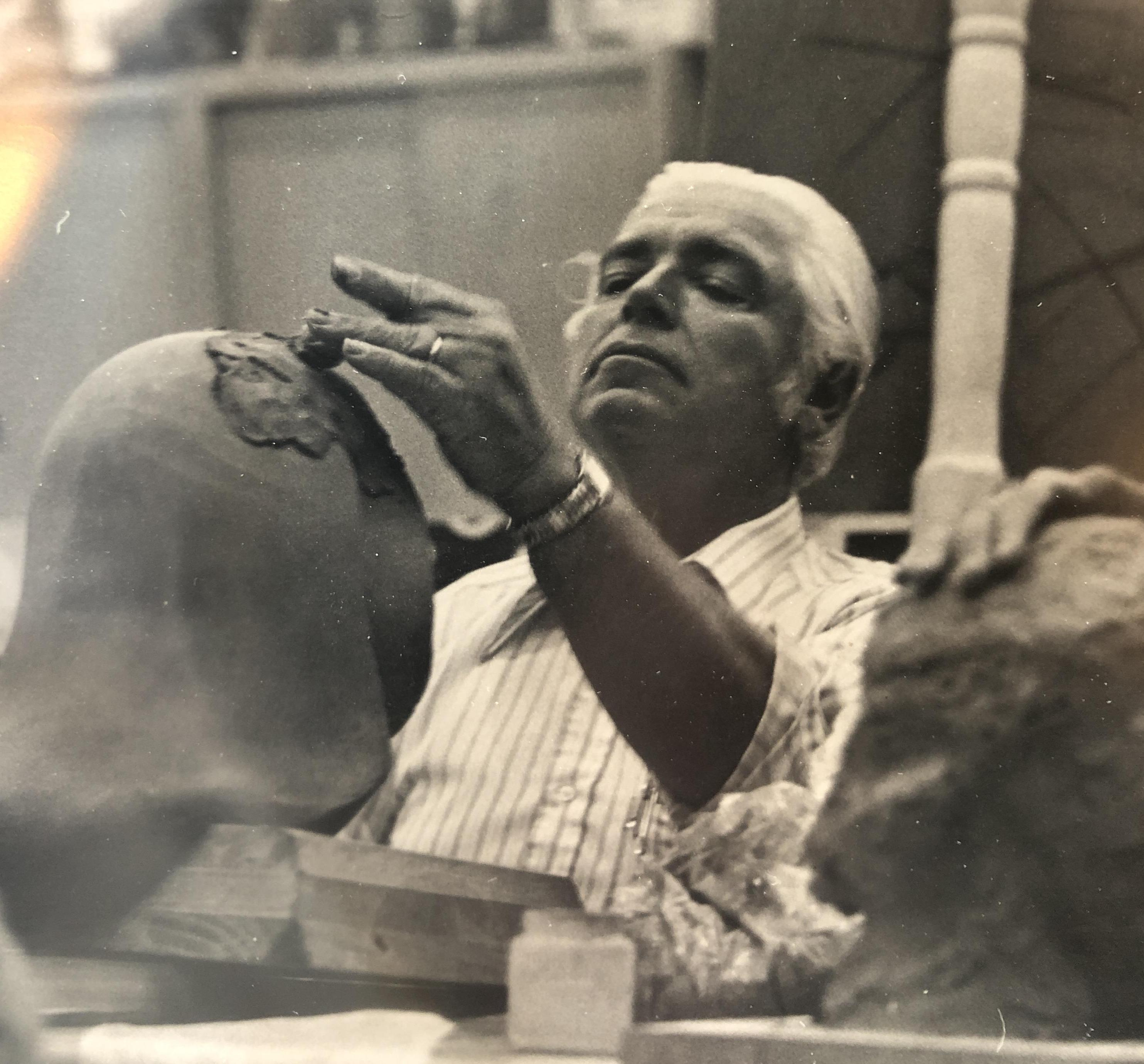
- Born: September 1, 1918; Arkansas City, Kansas, U.S.
- Died: April 24, 2003 (aged 84)
- Education: Kansas City Art Institute; Whitworth University (BFA); Brigham Young University (MFA)
- Occupation: Artist

Jack Edward Barber (September 1, 1918 – April 24, 2003) was an American artist working in oil, egg tempera, acrylics, watercolor, lithography, and sculpture.

== Education and early career ==
Jack Edward Barber was born in Arkansas City, Kansas, but raised in Ponca City, Oklahoma. After graduating from Ponca City High School, Barber attended the Kansas City Art Institute from 1938 to 1940, where he studied painting under Thomas Hart Benton, lithography under John de Martelly, and sculpture under William Wallace Rosenbauer. As was the case for many of his students, Benton's influence on Barber's art was significant and life-long. Barber often spoke about being a student in Benton's classes, and his perspective of Benton as a teacher was solicited for inclusion in several books about Benton. In 1993, two of Barber's paintings were part of a special exhibit sponsored by the Albrecht-Kemper Museum of Art in Saint Joseph, Missouri. Following the exhibit, both of Barber's paintings and one of his lithographic prints were included in a book, Under the Influence: The Students of Thomas Hart Benton. Barber later continued his art education by earning a Bachelor of Fine Arts degree at Whitworth University, and a Master of Fine Arts (MFA) degree at Brigham Young University.

== Career ==
Although World War II interrupted Barber's art education at the Kansas City Art Institute, he was one of several "soldier artists" assigned to paint murals at Fort Sill's U.S. Army Reception Center in Oklahoma. After the War, however, Barber found that Abstract Expressionism had replaced the American Regionalist style of painting that was the focus of the training he had received under Benton. This shift made it difficult for Barber to find gainful employment using his artistic skills. Although he continued to paint as an avocation, Barber did not return full-time to art for more than twenty years. This hiatus from art was not unique to Barber. Many of Benton's Kansas City Art Institute students whose art careers were interrupted by World War II did not return to art until later in life.

After completing a Bachelor of Fine Arts degree at Whitworth University in Spokane, WA, in 1967, Barber was hired as the head of the art department at Oregon City High School where he taught drawing, painting, watercolor, printmaking, and sculpture. After his retirement in 1985, Oregon City High School established an outstanding student artist award in his name.

=== Notable works and exhibits ===
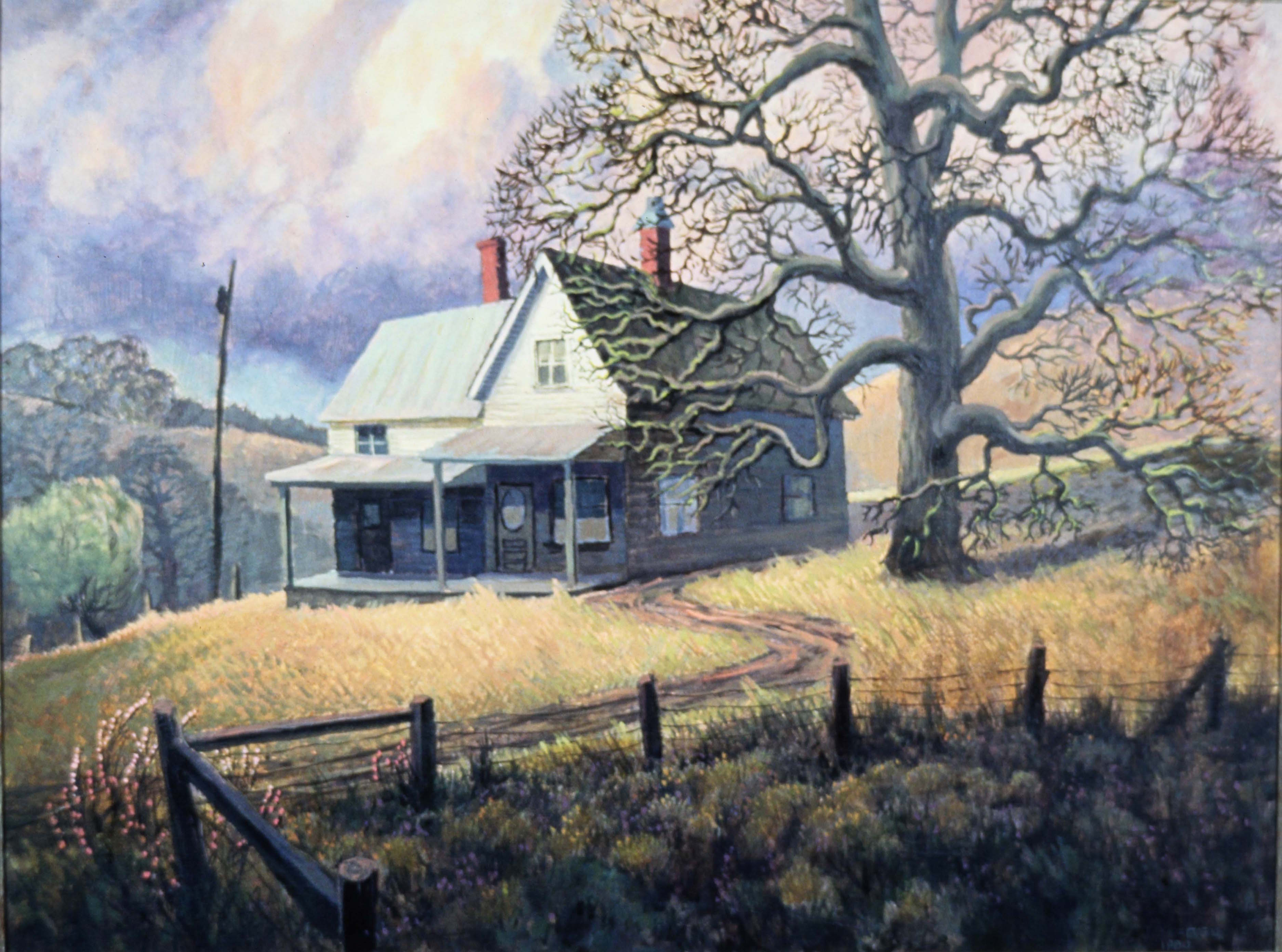
Homestead (1980)

- "Homestead", an oil-on-canvas landscape painting exhibited at the Albrecht-Kemper Museum of Art in St. Joseph, Missouri.
- "Strays", a lithograph included in the Reba and Dave Williams Collection at the National Gallery of Art.

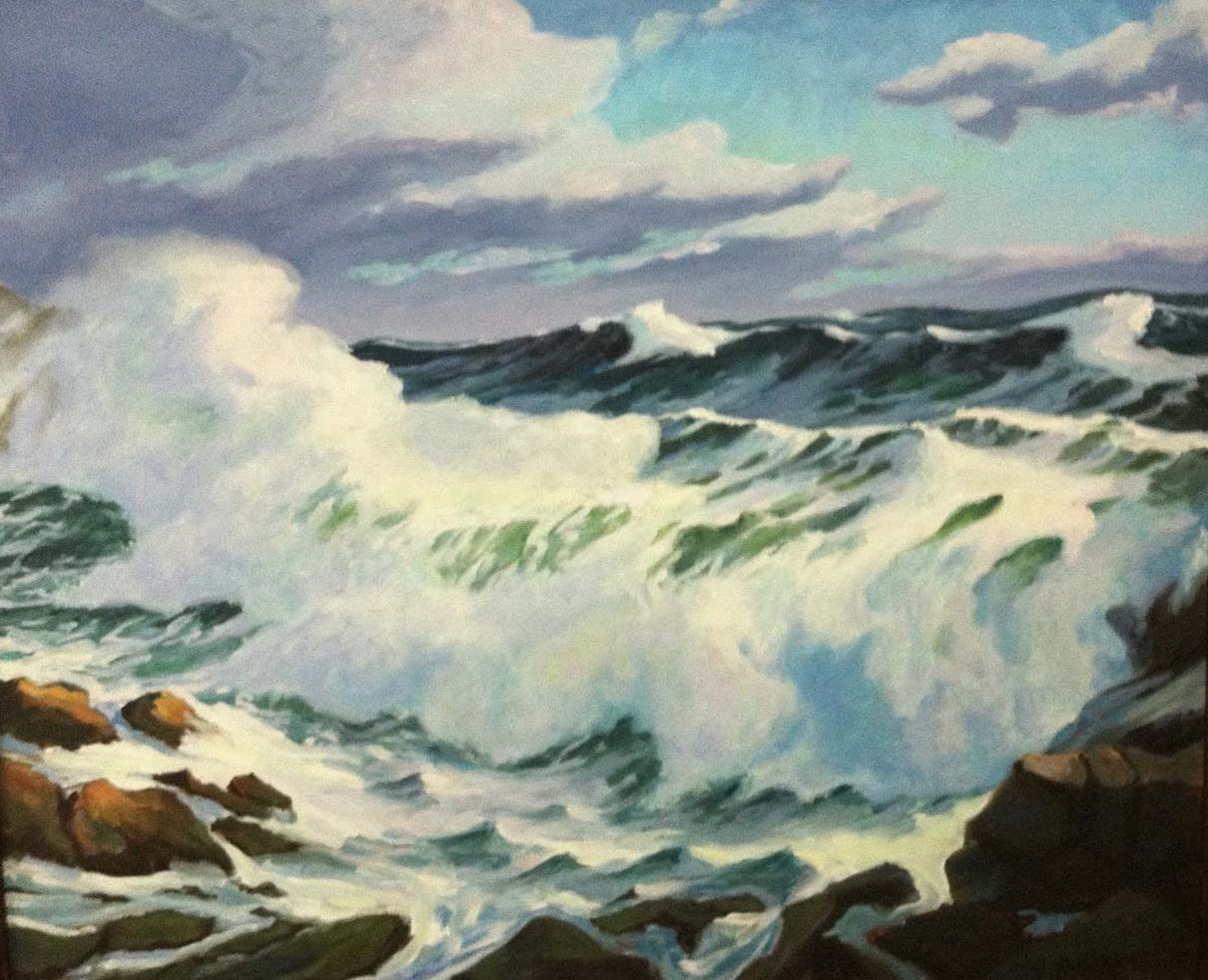
In the Wake of a Storm (no date)

- Oregon Coast seascapes (including "In the Wake of a Storm") - An exhibit at the Glatt House Gallery in Woodburn, Oregon.
- The West - An exhibit of 35 oil-on-canvas paintings at the Linus Pauling Center Gallery, Clackamas Community College, Clackamas, Oregon
- A Collection of Oil-on-Canvas Landscapes - An exhibit at the Linus Pauling Center Gallery, Clackamas Community College, Clackamas, Oregon
- "Portraits of Perseverance" - An exhibit of 25 portraits of persons who played a prominent role in the history of the Western United States.

=== Plein air ===
Almost all of Barber's landscapes and seascapes were initially painted or sketched on-site (i.e. en plein air). Barber's MFA thesis was a study of methods of plein air painting on the Oregon Coast. In the introduction to his thesis, Barber shared the following observation about the value of plein air painting: "Painting out-of-doors, where the artist can respond to the influence of the elements, is most rewarding in terms of successful production. This does not imply that changes will not be made in the studio nor that nature will not be altered by design for effect; but the subject matter is of great importance. In other words, painting is not purely for design alone, but the design is for the purpose of enhancing the subject matter."
