= Heart of Darkness (disambiguation) =

Heart of Darkness is an 1899 novella by Joseph Conrad.

Heart of Darkness may also refer to:

== Arts and media ==
=== Film ===
- Hearts of Darkness: A Filmmaker's Apocalypse, a 1991 documentary about the making of the 1979 film Apocalypse Now
- Heart of Darkness (1990 film), a film directed by Román Chalbaud, inspired by the novella
- Heart of Darkness (1994 film), a television film adaptation of Conrad's novella
- Heart of Darkness, a 2003 pornographic film starring Randy Spears

=== Television ===
- "Heart of Darkness" (Playhouse 90), S3E7 of Playhouse 90, a television play adaptation of Conrad's novella, 1958
- "Heart of Darkness" (Miami Vice), S1E3 of Miami Vice, 1984
- "Heart of Darkness" (Once Upon a Time), S1E16 of Once Upon a Time, 2012
- "Heart of Darkness" (The Vampire Diaries), S3E19 of The Vampire Diaries, 2012

=== Video games ===
- Heart of Darkness (video game), a 1998 cinematic platformer
- Heart of Darkness, a 2013 expansion pack for Victoria II

=== Comics ===
- Heart of Darkness (comic), a story in Star Wars Tales V. 4 #16, 2003

=== Music ===
- Heart of Darkness (opera), a 2011 chamber opera adaptation of Conrad's novella
- Hearts of Darkness (band), an American hip hop/big band
- Hearts of Darknesses, a solo dance-music project of Frank Musarra

==== Albums ====
- Heart of Darkness (Burnt by the Sun album), 2009
- Heart of Darkness (Grave Digger album), 1995
- Heart of Darkness (EP), by No Trend and Lydia Lunch, 1985
- The Heart of Darkness (album), by Hoodlum Priest, 1990
- Heart of Darkness, by Positive Noise, 1981

==== Songs ====
- "Heart of Darkness", by the Amazons from Future Dust, 2019
- "Heart of Darkness", by Arch Enemy from Wages of Sin, 2001
- "Heart of Darkness", by Black Label Society from Catacombs of the Black Vatican, 2014
- "Heart of Darkness", by Chris de Burgh from Power of Ten, 1992
- "Heart of Darkness", by Grave Digger from Heart of Darkness, 1995
- "Heart of Darkness", by the Headstones from Picture of Health, 1993
- "Heart of Darkness", by Heart, B-side of their 1985 single "What About Love"
- "Heart of Darkness", by Hoodoo Gurus from Blow Your Cool, 1987
- "Heart of Darkness", by Masterplan from MK II, 2007
- "Heart of Darkness", by Pere Ubu, B-side of the single "30 Seconds Over Tokyo", 1975
- "Heart of Darkness", by Sparklehorse from Vivadixiesubmarinetransmissionplot, 1995
- "Heart of Darkness", by Warbringer from Weapons of Tomorrow, 2020
- "Hearts of Darkness", by Cavalera Conspiracy from Inflikted, 2008
- "The Heart of Darkness", by Catamenia from Winternight Tragedies, 2005

== Other uses ==
- Heart of Darkness (brewery), a Vietnamese craft brewery
- Heart of Darkness (horse) (1988–2011), a British Thoroughbred racehorse

== See also ==
- "And the Heart of Darkness" (The Librarians), S1E8 of The Librarians (2015)
- "Art of Darkness!", S2E6 of Scooby-Doo! Mystery Incorporated (2012)
- From the Heart of Darkness, a 1983 short-story collection by David Drake
- In the Heart of Darkness, a 1998 Belisarius series novel by David Drake
- Out of the Heart of Darkness, 2023 album by L.A. Edwards
