= Karen Glaser =

Karen Glaser may refer to:

- Karen Glaser (photographer) (1954–2026), American underwater photographer
- Karen Glaser (actress), English actress
