= Cyan Meeks =

Cyan Meeks is an American video artist and filmmaker based in Kansas City. She is currently Associate Professor at Kansas City Art Institute in the Photography and Filmmaking Department.

== Work ==
Meeks takes a "transdisciplinary approach to her collaborative practice, blending filmmaking, photography, sound design, performance, social practice, curation and media study." Her work has been shown at the Sundance Film Festival, New Directors/New Films Festival at the Museum of Modern Art, Deuxieme Manifestation International Video et Art Electronique, Chicago Cultural Center, Marianna Kistler Beach Museum, the Nelson-Atkins Museum of Art, Biscayne National Park, the Tallgrass Prairie National Preserve, Athens International Film and Video Festival, Prince Music Theater and broadcast on the Independent Film Channel IFC (U.S. TV channel).

She received first place awards from the American Film Institute, New York Underground Film Festival, International Film Festival Amsterdam, and the Winslow International Film Festival; and has received several grants from the National Park Service. Her commercial work within the music industry has received accolades by The New York Times, NME and Spin. The music videos she has directed have been broadcast internationally on MTV, MTV Brasil, MTV (Southeast Asia), MTV (French TV channel), MTV (Latin America), MTV (Dutch TV channel) and MTV Africa.

In 1989, Meeks performed vocals and wrote lyrics for the song Rain on the Skinny Puppy album Rabies and worked as assistant editor for the visual projections for the band's Too Dark Park Tour in 1990. In 1994, she created the album artwork for the Chris Connelly (musician) album, Shipwreck and also created the artwork for the band The Gadjits album Today Is My Day.

In 2005 she founded Mercy Seat Gallery in Kansas City. She curated numerous solo and group art exhibitions over the course of 5 years with live music events in the Mercy Seat Alley. Artists shown include David Ford, Luke Rocha, Sike Style, Hector Casanova, GEAR, Molly Murphy and Renée Cinderhouse. Musical guests performing at the space included Hearts of Darkness (band), Rich Boys, Siddhartha (band), The Good Foot, Rex Hobart and the Misery Boys, The Haunted Creepies, and Joe Good. The gallery closed in 2009. In 2017 she co-founded The Union Library, an alternative workspace, exhibition space, performance venue and sound recording studio to serve her local community who didn't have access to these creative opportunities. Throughout the years, The Union Library has provided artists and performers the space and resources needed to obtain their goals and to build their individual followings while contributing to the cohesion of the local creative community. It has served internationally known artists including: Bill Daniel (filmmaker), Justice Yeldham, John Bender (pioneer of minimalist synth), Adam Morosky (a.k.a. Timeghost), Street Sects, Savage Republic and Freight Train Rabbit Killer.

Under the pseudonym Cinemaphonic, Cyan Meeks and sound artist Stephen Cruz have performed to over 70 audiences throughout the American Midwest since 2012. Cinemaphonic is a visual and aural performance group that taps into audiences' subconscious by communicating through sourced cultural relics of cinematic moments to induce specific emotive responses. It is an exploration of re-contextualizing visual and auditory nostalgia into something that speaks of cultural values, sometimes profound, facetious- even beautiful. The group has been described as a "sonic voyage through the screen of the mind."

She received her Bachelor of Fine Arts degree in new media from the Kansas City Art Institute in 1995, studied for her MFA degree at the California Institute of the Arts in 1997 under James Benning (film director). She completed her MFA degree in media studies at the State University of New York at Buffalo in 2003 where she studied under Tony Conrad and the director of the ethnographic film Drums of Winter, Sarah Elder.

Her films and video are shown internationally. She currently lives in Kansas City, Kansas and works in Kansas City, Missouri.

== Selected works ==
- "Union Library", Co-founder (2017-2019), Gallery and Performance Space.
- "Phainesthai", Director (2018), Experimental Documentary Film and Photographic Series.
- "Feed My Brain", Radkey, Co-Director (2018), Music Video.
- "Downstream", Photographer (2017), Photographic Series.
- "The Chemical Method", Director (2017), Live Projection Performance.
- "New American Video Series", Director (2016), Documentary Film.
- "Illum-A-Fest", (2016), Live Projection Performance.
- "Outer Reaches", Director (2016), Live Projection Performance.
- "The Good with the Bad", Samsaya, Co-Director (2014), Music Video.
- "Collide", Brede Baldwin, Assistant Director (2014), Music Video.
- "Cinemaphonic - 144", Live Video/Aural Performance (2014), Video: Cyan Meeks, Audio: Stephen Cruz
- "Cinemaphonic - 125", Live Video/Aural Performance (2014), Video: Cyan Meeks, Audio: Stephen Cruz
- "Romance Dawn", Radkey, Co-Director (2013), Music Video.
- "Cinemaphonic - 1244", Live Video/Aural Performance (2013), Video: Cyan Meeks, Audio: Stephen Cruz
- "Cinemaphonic - 1207", Live Video/Aural Performance (2013), Video: Cyan Meeks, Audio: Stephen Cruz
- "Cinemaphonic - 112", Live Video/Aural Performance (2012), Video: Cyan Meeks, Audio: Stephen Cruz
- "Queens Rocket", JFA, Co-Director (2012), Designer Promo.
- "Driftwood", Director (2010), Experimental Documentary.
- "Sylvia", The Antlers, Editor/Visual Effects (2010), Music Video.
- "The Lizard Song", Via Audio, Editor/Visual Treatment (2010), Music Video.
- "Douglas Sumner: The Root of Blight Within a Community", Director (2010), Documentary.
- "Sylvia", The Antlers, Editor/Visual Effects (2010), Music Video.
- "The Lizard Song", Via Audio, Editor/Visual Treatment (2010), Music Video.
- "Aqua Pasma", Director (2005-2010), Ambient Documentary Loop.
- "Stay the Same Never Change", Audio, Talent and Director's Assistant (2009), Experimental Narrative.
- "We Were Right All ALong", The Gadjits, Director (2003), Documentary/Music Performance.
- "Planetarium", Phoenix Video Light Show (1997), Live Ambient Video Performance/Installation.
- "With Words Nearly Signed", Director (1995), Experimental Video.
