= Lee Jackson =

Lee Jackson is the name of:

- Lee Jackson (blues musician) (1921–1979), American Chicago blues musician
- Lee Jackson (bassist) (born 1943), English musician
- Lee Jackson (composer) (born 1963), American video game composer
- Lee Jackson (rugby league) (born 1969), English rugby league footballer
- Lee Jackson (author) (born 1971), British author and historian
- Lee Jackson (biathlete) (born 1980), English biathlete
- Lee F. Jackson (fl. 2002–2017), former chancellor of the University of North Texas System

== See also ==
- Lee–Jackson Day, a former state holiday in the US state of Virginia
- Jackson Lee (disambiguation)
