= Jackson Lee =

Jackson Lee may refer to:

- Jackson Lee (racing driver) (born 2002), American racing driver
- Jackson Lee (soccer) (born 2001), Australian soccer player

== See also ==
- Jackson Lee Nesbitt (1913–2008), American printmaker, teacher, painter, and ad executive
- Sheila Jackson Lee (1950–2024), American lawyer and politician
- Lee Jackson (disambiguation)
- Jackson Yee (born 2000), Chinese actor and musician
