= Jackson Lee Nesbitt =

American painter

- Born: Jackson Lee Nesbitt; June 16, 1913; McAlester, Oklahoma, U.S.
- Died: 20 February 2008 (aged 94); Tucker, Georgia, U.S.
- Education: University of Oklahoma, Norman (1931-33), Kansas City Art Institute (1933-1941)
- Occupations: Artist, Teacher, Ad Executive
- Years active: 1930-2008
- Known for: Printmaking, Painting
- Spouse: Elaine Thompson (m. 1938–2003; death)
- Awards: Eames Prize awarded by the Society of American Etchers

Jackson Lee Nesbitt (June 16, 1913 – February 20, 2008) was an American printmaker, teacher, painter, and ad executive. He took pride in calling Thomas Hart Benton a teacher, a mentor and his friend. Jack stayed true to his Regionalist roots, despite the dominance of Abstract Expressionism and he enjoyed the resurrection of his career at age 75.

== Early life and career ==
Jackson Lee Nesbitt was born in McAlester, Oklahoma and worked for his father's printing business until 1931, when he enrolled in the University of Oklahoma, Norman. His name is derived from his maternal and paternal grandparents. His grandfather, James Blackburn Nesbitt, fought on the Union side at Shiloh in the American Civil War.

After two years in Norman, Nesbitt enrolled at the Kansas City Art Institute off and on from 1933 to 1941, working primarily with painter-professor Ross Braught, famed Regionalist painter Thomas Hart Benton, and printmaker John de Martelly. Nesbitt and Benton were also friends who traveled and sketched together often.

Artwork by Nesbitt appeared alongside fellow KCAI students James Duard Marshall and Gene Pyle in the 1937-1938 KCAI course catalog. In 1946, Nesbitt was awarded the Eames Prize by the Society of American Etchers.

== The Benton Boys ==
Notable artists also attending courses while Nesbitt was a student at the Kansas City Art Institute include Roger Norman Medearis (1920-2001), William Kautzman (1916-2008), James Duard Marshall (1914-2010), William Wind McKim (1916-1995), Earl Fred Bennett (1919-2007), and Kenneth Pauling Riley (1919-2015), all of which he considered personal friends.

In 1993, Kansas City’s Legacy Art Gallery, would exhibit works by Nesbitt and other artists found in the book Under the Influence: The Students of Thomas Hart Benton. The gallery exhibition opened in conjunction with the Albrecht-Kemper Museum of Art and the publication of the book authored by Dr. Marianne Berardi, and her husband and Thomas Hart Benton authenticator, Dr. Henry Adams. The book and the subsequent gallery opening in Kansas City led to several articles featuring these artists in the Journal of Print World.

== Men of Steel ==
The 1937 etching, Tapping a Heat, was the first image of a steel mill that Jack Nesbitt created. His images of workers and steel mills was prompted by an inquiry from Sheffield Steel. Sheffield called the Kansas City Art Institute seeking an artist to do imagery of their corporation and the Institute referred Nesbitt and John de Martelly. However, John had absolutely no interest in spending time sketching in the hot and dirty atmosphere of a mill. For all the Sheffield pieces, Nesbitt had to submit a finished pencil drawing prior to creating the etching. The original etchings were given as Christmas presents to VIPs both inside and outside the company as well as being offered for sale to employees. The company also printed smaller format reproduction as a company Christmas card. Brown and Bigelow used an indented panel on the reproductions to simulate the platemark of an original etching.

The money that Jack received from the Sheffield project was just enough for Elaine and Jack to get married in 1938.

== Advertising career ==
Financial necessity eventually forced Nesbitt to give up his art for a successful career in the advertising industry to provide for his family. Nesbitt did not speak with Benton for many years out of embarrassment. Nevertheless, Benton, and his wife Rita, always considered Nesbitt to be one of his finest students.

Jack Nesbitt's talent in the advertising business eventually lead to him the founding of an ad agency. He was his own graphic director. He created calendars by day and fine art by night. Nesbitt sold his company after 30 years and in retirement, he again turned full time to art.

== Later career ==
In the late 1970s the public began to pay more attention to American art of the 1930s and 1940. Realism was once again in vogue, and June and Norman Kraeft of June 1 Gallery in Bethlehem, CT were among those leading the revival. The Kraefts visited with Nesbitt and bought all his remaining prints. They were also introduced Jack to Mohammed Khalid, a master printer in New York. This led to the completion of an old etching plate that had been started in 1955. The success of Old Man with a Violin restarted Nesbitt's career.

In 1988, he created his first new image in 33 years, Ozark Father, and five other editioned lithographs before his death. Auction Barn created in 1989 is considered by many to be one of the great prints of the 20th Century.

In October 1993 Stone and Press Gallery in New Orleans opened a retrospective exhibition of the graphic work of Nesbitt in New Orleans. In tandem with the exhibition, Earl Retif and Ann Salzer published the catalogue raisonne of Nesbitt's work. To prepare the catalog, the authors made many trips to the Nesbitt home in Atlanta where they taped (audio and video) hours of the artist talking about each of his works, placing them into the context of his career.

Ann Moore (Michelle), who was then at the New Orleans Museum of Art, wrote an essay placing Nesbitt in the overall art scene.

== Personal life ==
Jack Nesbitt was married to his wife, Elaine for 64 years until her death in 2003. They met at the Kansas City Art Institute where Elaine Thompson was a student in fashion design. They were married on June 1, 1938. The couple had three children: Kathryn, Evelyn Elaine, & Thomas. Elaine designed hats that were favorites of Rita Benton. The Thomas Hart Benton lithographs in the Nesbitt's collection were inscribed "to Elaine from Rita".

Jack Nesbitt was a storyteller who, it is claimed, was more comfortable talking about anything other than his own accomplishments. It became a running joke that "he would get 'round to it".

== Associated American Artists ==
Associated American Artists was instrumental in helping artists through their purchase and marketing of an entire edition of a specific image. The AAA program contributed to helping American artists support their families during the financial depression; it also made original art affordable for collectors.

In 1939 AAA contracted with Jackson Lee Nesbitt to offer Watering Place as one of its editions. The arrangements called for the printing of 250 images, 25 of which were reserved for the artist. AAA paid $250 ($5400 in 2023 dollars) for the entire edition and then offered them to public at $5 ($106 in 2023 dollars) apiece. Nesbitt produced 4 other images for AAA, Ozark Bridge, Evening in March, November Evening, and October Afternoon.

Nesbitt referred to Reeves Lewenthal, then Director of AAA, as “tighter than the bark on a birch tree.” Lewenthal wanted to see the finished work before he would commit to buying it. It would take Nesbitt about eight weeks to create a finished etching plate and it was financially devastating for the artist when an image was not approved. A sixth image by Nesbitt, Streetcar was not purchased by AAA.

A number of illustrations of Jackson Lee Nesbitt's work appeared in Art for Every Home, AAA 1934-2000, Nesbitt's 1942 painting of Apple Pickers that had appeared on the cover of Country Gentleman was reproduced on p. 40. His etching, November Evening is illustrated on page 40 and the 1947 egg tempura, Farm Auction, Jackson County is fully reproduced on p. 144. and a full-page illustration of a detail of that painting is on p. 120.

== List of Museums with Jackson Lee Nesbitt's work in their collections ==
- Amon Carter Museum of Art
- Ackland Art Museum, UNC Chapel Hill, NC
- Addison Gallery of American Art, Andover, MA
- Albrecht-Kemper Art Museum, St. Joseph, MO
- Albright-Knox Museum, Buffalo, NY
- Boston Public Library
- Carnegie Museum of Art, Pittsburg, PA
- Cleveland Museum of Art
- Columbia Museum of Art, Columbia, SC
- Columbus Museum of Art, Columbus, GA
- Columbus Museum of Art, Columbus, OH
- Farnsworth Art Museum, Rockland, ME
- Georgia Museum of Art
- Georgetown University Art Collection, Washington DC
- High Museum of Art
- Kalamazoo institute of the Arts, Kalamazoo MI
- Krannert Art Museum at U. of Illinois
- Kresge Art Museum
- Library of Congress
- Mead Art Museum at Amherst College
- Memphis Brooks Museum of Art
- Minneapolis Institute of Art
- Morris Museum of Art, Augusta, GA
- Muscarelle Museum of Art at College of William & Mary U. Williamsburg VA
- Muskegon Museum of Art, Muskegon, MI
- Nelson-Atkins Museum of Art, Kansas City, Missouri
- New Orleans Museum of Art
- Philbrook Art Museum, Tulsa, OK
- Orlando Museum of Art
- Smithsonian American Art Museum
- Santa Barbara Museum of Art
- Syracuse University Art Museum
- Toledo Museum of Art
- Weisman Art Museum at U of Minnesota, Minneapolis, MN
- Wichita Falls Museum of Art, Wichita, TX

== Sources ==
- Retif Earl and Salzer, Ann, Jackson Lee Nesbitt: The Graphic Work. Stone And Press Galleries. 1993
- Under the Influence: The Students of Thomas Hart Benton. Marianne Berardi. The Albrecht-Kemper Museum of Art. 1993
- The Artists Bluebook. Lonnie Pierson Dunbar, editor. March 2005.
- Davenport's Art Reference. Ray Davenport. 2005.
- Who Was Who in American Art. Peter Hastings Falk (editor). 1999
- Kansas City Regional Art. Associated American Artists. New York. 1940
- American Prize Prints of the 20th Century. Albert Reese. American Artists Group. 1949
- Retif, Earl, Jackson Lee Nesbitt (1913-2008), Journal of the Print World, Spring 2008 p. 7
- Kraeft, June and Norman, The Wonder of Work, Exhibition of prints about workers including 15 images by Jackson lee Nesbitt, January 1984
- North, Bill and Goddard, Stephen, Rural American — Prints from the Collection of Steven Schmidt, Spencer Museum of Art, 1993, ISBN 0913689378
- Craven, Thomas, Thomas Hart Benton, An American Phenomenon, Associated American Artists, 1938
- Seaton, ElizabethJ., Myers, Jane, Windisch, Gail, Art for EverynHome, Associated American Artists, 1934-2000, Marianna Kistler Beach Museum of Art, Kansas State University, Manhattan, Kansas, Yale University Press, ISBN 9780300215793
- Retif, Earl, Jackson Lee Nesbitt , Journal of the Print World, Winter 1990 p. 19
