= Harold Bruder =

American realist painter (born 1930)

- Born: Harold Jacob Bruder; August 31, 1930 (age 96); The Bronx, New York, U.S.
- Education: Cooper Union School of Art
- Known for: Painting
- Movement: New Realism
- Awards: National Endowment for the Arts Visual Arts Fellowship (1985)

Harold Jacob Bruder (born August 31, 1930) is an American realist painter. In 1984, he was honored with a National Endowment for the Arts Fellowship. He is a former professor of art, working with the Kansas City Art Institute, Pratt Institute, National Academy of Design, Aspen Art Museum, and Queens College of the City University of New York (CUNY). He served as the Chairman of the Art Department at CUNY, where he taught painting and drawing for 30 years, retiring in 1995, as Professor Emeritus.

== Personal background ==
Bruder was born in 1930 in Bronx, New York. He studied at High School of Music and Art and Cooper Union School of Art in New York City. He studied singing privately during this period and those experiences later influenced his writings and lectures on early opera singers. He graduated from Cooper Union in 1951.

== Professional background ==
After graduating from college, Bruder worked as a graphic designer and art director in Manhattan for 12 years, while painting privately and occasionally exhibiting. During this time, he studied printmaking at the Pratt Graphic Art Center.

In 1962, Bruder's first one-person show of genre paintings, derived from family photographs at the Robert Isaacson Gallery drew considerable attention in the press and art magazines. In 1963, his work was included in the Corcoran Gallery of Art biennial art exhibition in Washington, D.C., and the Pennsylvania Academy of the Fine Arts annual art exhibition in Philadelphia.

In 1963, Bruder moved to Kansas City, Missouri with his family, and became Chairman of the Graphic Design Department at the Kansas City Art Institute. He taught painting the second year and exhibited at the Art Institute in 1964, as well as the prestigious Durlacher Bros. Gallery (owned by Robert Isaacson) in New York City.

In 1965, Bruder returned to New York from Kansas City. He subsequently joined the faculty of the Fashion Institute of Technology, Pratt Institute, and Queens College of the City University of New York, teaching in the art departments. While he left the Fashion Institute and Pratt Institute after one year, he continued working with CUNY for over 30 years.

In the summer of 1967, Bruder taught at the Aspen School of Contemporary Art in Aspen, Colorado.

Bruder's work was featured in numerous exhibits over the next few years that focused on "New Realism". In 1970, he was one of the original group of realist painters in the Whitney Museum of American Art's "22 Realists", along with Chuck Close, Audrey Flack, and Philip Pearlstein.

In the late 1970s, he began "The Vault Series", a group of six large paintings of draperies stretched across a wall that were exhibited at the Queens Museum of Art in 1982, and later at the Armstrong Gallery in New York in 1984. The reviews commented on Bruder's concern with renaissance-like tactility, air, and light, comparing Bruder with Titian and Michelangelo.

Over the next decade, Bruder continued exhibiting regularly at Durlacher Bros., Armstrong Gallery, and Forum Gallery, as well as in numerous museum and gallery group exhibitions throughout the United States.

In 1965, he returned to New York from Kansas City. He joined the faculty of Queens College of the City University of New York (CUNY). He taught painting and drawing there for 30 years, serving as Chairman of the Art Department in the early 1980s, retiring in 1995, as Professor Emeritus.

After retirement from CUNY, Bruder briefly joined the staff at the National Academy of Design in New York City.

== Public collections ==
In 2004, a mini-retrospective covering 40 years of Bruder's work was held at the Mitchell Algus Gallery in New York. Public collections include the following.

- Hirshhorn Museum of the Smithsonian, Washington, D.C.
- University of New Mexico Art Museum
- Sheldon Museum of Art of the University of Nebraska–Lincoln
- New Jersey State Museum
- Montclair Art Museum, Montclair, New Jersey
- Goddard Art Center, Ardmore, Oklahoma
- Palm Springs Desert Museum
- Albert List Foundation

== Art exhibitions ==
=== Solo exhibitions ===
- 1962: Robert Isaacson Gallery, New York City
- 1964: Kansas City Art Institute, Kansas City, Missouri
- 1964: Durlacher Bros., New York City
- 1967: Durlacher Bros., New York City
- 1968: Forum Gallery, New York City
- 1969: Owen Gallery, Denver, Colorado
- 1969: Forum Gallery, New York City
- 1972: Forum Gallery, New York City
- 1976: Forum Gallery, New York City
- 1979: William & Mary College, Williamsburg, Virginia
- 1979: Forum Gallery, New York City
- 1982: "The Vault Series" Queens Museum of Art, Flushing, New York
- 1984: "The Vault Series" Armstrong Gallery, New York City
- 1986: Armstrong Gallery, New York City
- 1988: Contemporary Realist Gallery, San Francisco, California
- 2004: "Selected Paintings 1963-2003" Mitchell Algus Gallery, New York City
- 2005: "Time & the Tabletop" Queens College Art Center, Flushing, New York

=== Group exhibitions ===
- 1963: "Pennsylvania Academy Annual"
- 1963: "9 Realist Painters" Robert Schoelkopf Gallery, New York City
- 1963: "Corcoran Biennial" Corcoran Gallery of Art, Washington, D.C.
- 1964: "Modern Realism & Surrealism" American Federation of Arts
- 1965: "Contemporaries 1" Gallery of Modern Art, New York City
- 1965: "The Painter & the Photograph" University of New Mexico
- 1967: "Environment" Terry Dintenfass Gallery, New York City
- 1970: "22 Realists" Whitney Museum of American Art, New York City
- 1970: "Paintings From the Photo" Riverside Museum, New York City
- 1970: "New-Realism" St. Cloud State College, St. Cloud, Minnesota
- 1972: "Painters of Land & Sky", Colgate University
- 1973: "A Sense of Place" University of Nebraska–Lincoln
- 1973: "The Realist Revival" New York City Cultural Center
- 1973: "American Realist Painting" Espace Cardi, Paris, France
- 1974: "Aspects of the Figure" Cleveland Museum of Art
- 1974: "Living American Artists & The Figure" University of Pennsylvania
- 1974: "The Figure in Recent American Painting" Westminster College
- 1975: "Candid Painting" DeCordoba Museum, Boston, Massachusetts
- 1975: "Portrait Painting" Allan Frumkin Gallery, New York City
- 1976: "American Art Today" University of Virginia Museum of Art
- 1976: "This Land is My Land" New Jersey State Museum, Trenton, New Jersey
- 1976: "American Family Portraits" Philadelphia Museum of Art
- 1976: "Liturgical Arts" The Civic Center, Philadelphia, Pennsylvania
- 1976: "Urban Aesthetics" Queens Museum of Art, Flushing, New York
- 1978: American Academy of Arts & Letters, New York City
- 1979: "Things Seen" University of Nebraska–Lincoln
- 1983: "Painting New York" Museum of the City of New York, New York City
- 1983: "The Figure Observed" University of Florida, Gainesville, Florida
- 1984: "9 Realist Painters Revisited" Robert Schoelkopf Gallery, New York City
- 1985: "Survival of the Fittest" Ingber Gallery, New York City
- 1985: Art Institute of Boston, Boston, Massachusetts
- 1985: Minneapolis College of Art, Minneapolis, Minnesota
- 1986: "Movietone Muse" One Penn Plaza, New York City
- 1987: "Visions of America" ACA Gallery, New York City
- 1987: "American Art Today" Florida International University, Miami, Florida
- 1988: "Triumph of Virtue" National Academy of Design, New York City
- 1989: Columbus Museum of Art, Columbus, Ohio
- 1989: "University & the Arts" Wayne State University, Detroit, Michigan
- 1990: "Objects Observed" Gallery Henoch, New York City
- 1992: Lillian Heidenberg Gallery, New York City
- 1996: National Academy of Design, New York City
- 1996: Gremillion & Co., Houston, Texas
- 2002: "Summer Exhibit" Walter Wickiser Gallery, New York City
- 2008: "Five Views to the Landscape" Riverrun Gallery, Lambertville, New Jersey
- 2008: "An Exhibition of East Coast Landscapes" Fieldstone Gallery, Ramsey, New Jersey

== Honors and awards ==
- 1974: CUNY Faculty Research Award
- 1979: American Academy of Arts & Letters Award
- 1979: CUNY Faculty Research Award
- 1984: CUNY Faculty Research Award
- 1985: National Endowment for the Arts: Visual Arts Fellowship
- 1987: Queens College Faculty-in-Residence Award
- 1988: CUNY Faculty Research Award
