= Frederic James =

American painter

Frederic James (1915–1985) was an American painter who specialized in watercolors. He was associated with the Regionalist art movement.

== Early life ==
Frederic James was born in Kansas City, Missouri, in 1915. His father was master of the Santa Fe Railroad yards. James showed an early talent for painting, and in 1934, the Nelson-Atkins Museum of Art in Kansas City accepted one of his watercolors for their Midwestern Exhibition. James attended the University of Michigan and majored in architecture. Upon his graduation, he was awarded an architecture scholarship to the Cranbrook Academy of Art, where he was close friends with Eero Saarinen, Ralph Rapson, and Charles and Ray Eames. Working in a partnership with Saarinen and Rapson, he won a national competition, sponsored by the Museum of Modern Art, to design a national theater in Williamsburg, Virginia, beating out, among others, Philip S. Goodwin and Edward Durrell Stone. Despite his talent, architecture was not James' passion, and the only building he ever designed and built was his home in Kansas City.

== Art career ==
In 1939, he returned to Kansas City and dedicated himself to becoming a painter. That year, he won the watercolor prize competition at the Kansas City Art Institute. His career quickly gained momentum. In 1940, he had a piece accepted for the International Exhibition of Watercolors at the Art Institute of Chicago and won the Friends of Art Purchase Prize in the Midwestern Artists Exhibition of the Kansas City Art Institute. The Art Institute immediately hired him to teach watercolor classes, and James began a close association with fellow teacher and famed Regionalist artist Thomas Hart Benton. Benton selected 15 of James’ watercolors to be included in a widely publicized exhibition of his students’ work that was held at the Associated American Artists Gallery in New York City in November 1940.

James’ art career was put on hold by World War II. He enlisted and was assigned first to Fort Leonard Wood and later to Brazil, never seeing the European or Pacific Theaters of War. Following the war, James returned to Kansas City and resumed his painting and teaching career at the Art Institute. In 1947, he married Diana Hearne. James had vacationed at Martha's Vineyard with Benton’s family for a few years, and soon purchased a second home on Martha's Vineyard as well. He also gave up his teaching position to concentrate on painting, and his reputation continued to expand, winning the Purchase Award at the Mid-America Annual Art Show in 1951 and holding a well-received one-man show at the Associated American Artists Gallery in New York in 1952. In 1954, the Nelson-Atkins Museum of Art held an exhibition of his work in their main loan gallery. After the mid-1950s, James lost interest in promoting his work on a national stage, but he continued his prolific output, producing many watercolors of rural Missouri and Kansas, especially the Flint Hills of Kansas. In addition to his watercolors, James did murals for the Trinity Lutheran Church in Mission, Kansas; the Overland Park State Bank, and the Kansas and Consumer's Coop Association. He also completed a wild flower series of prints of the New York Botanical Garden. He died in 1985.

== Sources ==
- Frederic James: A Painter from Kansas City. The Nelson-Atkins Museum of Art, Kansas City. Henry Adams. 1986.
- Frederic James: The Early Years, 1935-1955. Thomas McCormack Works of Art, Kansas City, MO, 1992.
- The Artists Bluebook. Lonnie Pierson Dunbar, editor. March 2005.
- Under the Influence: The Students of Thomas Hart Benton. Marianne Berardi. The Albrecht-Kemper Museum of Art. 1993
- Davenport's Art Reference. Ray Davenport. 2005.
- Who Was Who in American Art. Peter Hastings Falk (editor). 1999
- American Drawings and Watercolors from the Kansas City Region. Henry Adams. The Nelson-Atkins Museum of Art, Kansas City. 1992.
- The Annual Exhibition Record of the Art Institute of Chicago. Peter Hastings Falk. 1990.
- The Society of Independent Artists Exhibition Record, 1917-1944. 1984.
- Missouri, Heart of the Nation: Pictorial Record of Fourteen Artists. Charles Ravensway. 1947.
- Kansas City Regional Art. Associated American Artists. New York. 1940
