= John Patrick =

John or Johnny Patrick may refer to:

== Arts and entertainment ==
- John Douglas Patrick (1863–1937), American painter
- John Patrick (dramatist) (1905–1995), American playwright and screenwriter
- John Patrick (fashion designer), American fashion designer

== Sports ==
- John Patrick (footballer, born 1870) (1870–1945), Scottish footballer
- John Patrick (golfer) (fl. 1895), Scottish golfer
- John Patrick (rugby union) (1898–1959), American rugby union player
- John Patrick (American football) (1918–2000), American football player
- John Patrick (cricketer) (born 1955), Grenadian cricketer
- John Patrick (basketball) (born 1968), American basketball coach
- Johnny Patrick (born 1988), American football cornerback
- John Patrick (footballer, born 2003), Irish footballer

== Others ==
- John Patrick (Northern Ireland politician) (1898–?), Northern Irish politician
- John R. Patrick (born 1945), American businessman
- John Patrick (Maine politician) (born 1954), American politician
