= Ruth Harris Bohan =

American artist (1891-1981)

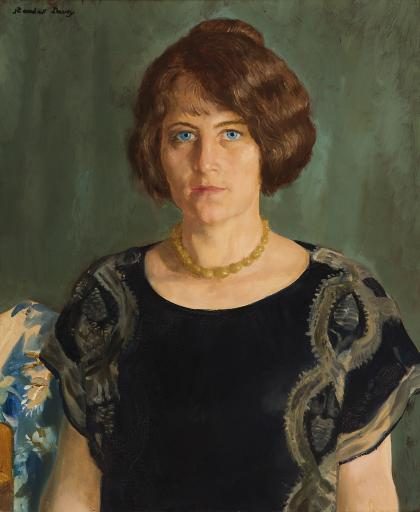
- Born: Ruth A. Harris; September 15, 1891; Petersburg, Illinois
- Died: August 16, 1981 (aged 89); Kansas City, Missouri
- Known for: Painting

Ruth Harris Bohan was an American artist (1891-1981).

Bohan was born on September 15, 1891 in Petersburg, Illinois. She studied at the Fine Arts Institute of Kansas City. Bohan died on August 16, 1981 in Kansas City, Missouri.

Her work is in the collection of the Spencer Museum of Art, Her portrait of James Alexander Reed is in the National Portrait Gallery.
