= Dean Snyder =

American sculptor

- Born: 1953 (age 72–73); Philadelphia, Pennsylvania, US
- Education: School of the Art Institute of Chicago; Kansas City Art Institute
- Known for: Sculpture, drawing
- Awards: Guggenheim Fellowship; Louis Comfort Tiffany Foundation; National Endowment for the Arts
- Website: Dean Snyder Studio

Dean Snyder, Exhibition installation, DeCordova Museum "Annual," 2001; Pictured: (left) Joop, sewn and inflated rawhide and turned wood, 96" x 57" x 57", 2001; (background) Sensus, graphite on paper, 5' x 30', 2001; (right) Boogle, sewn and inflated rawhide and turned wood, 60" diameter, 2001.

Dean Snyder (born 1953) is an American artist recognized for his sculpture and drawing, both of which sometimes take hybrid form. The works feature ambiguous forms that reference nature and common objects. Snyder is known for his unusual finishes, which result from the application of labor-intensive processes to unorthodox materials ranging from rawhide to automotive paint. Jenn Joy of Sculpture Magazine called Snyder "a shrewd manipulator of skin and surface." Critics also note the psycho-affective aspects of Snyder's work, often describing it in emotional or anthropomorphic terms.

Snyder has been awarded a Guggenheim Fellowship and grants from the Louis Comfort Tiffany Foundation and National Endowment for the Arts, among other organizations. He has exhibited at the American Academy of Arts and Letters, Contemporary Arts Center, DeCordova Sculpture Park and Museum, MASS MoCA, National Academy, and internationally, at the Beijing Olympic Park for the 2008 Olympic Games and Sculpture by the Sea in Sydney, Australia. His work is held in the public collections of the Nelson-Atkins Museum of Art, Smart Museum of Art, RISD Museum, and Tang Museum, among others. Snyder is based in New England and is professor emeritus at the Rhode Island School of Design (RISD).

== Life and career ==
Snyder was born in Philadelphia, Pennsylvania in 1953. He grew up on a farm in Lancaster County, Pennsylvania, where his father was a large animal veterinarian and managed farms. His summer holidays were spent on the boardwalks and arcades of the New Jersey shore; these contrasting early experiences later fueled material aspects of his art. Snyder studied photography before shifting to sculpture at the Kansas City Art Institute, earning a BFA in 1974. After receiving a British Arts Council fellowship he did postgraduate work in sculpture at Lanchester Polytechnic in the United Kingdom in 1975–76. In 1978, he completed an MFA in sculpture at the School of the Art Institute of Chicago. He worked as an artist and taught in Chicago and Kansas City for a decade before moving to Oakland, California in 1989 and the eastern United States in 1993.

Snyder has had solo exhibitions at galleries including Zolla/Lieberman (Chicago), Miller/Block (Boston), Jennjoy (San Francisco) and Cade Tompkins Projects (Providence), as well as at the Instituto Cultural Peruano Norte Americano in Lima (1999) and Tang Museum (2008), among other venues. His work was exhibited in the DeCordova Museum shows "On the Ball" (1998) and the 2001 Annual, as well as in surveys including "Chicago – Some Other Traditions" (Madison Art Center, 1983), "Contemporary Screens" (Contemporary Arts Center, 1986), "Earthly Delights" (MassArt, 2004), and "Chain Reaction: Rube Goldberg and Contemporary Art" (2002) and "Twice Drawn" (2008), both at the Tang Museum.

Snyder was on the art faculty at RISD from 2000 to 2025, serving as a professor, head of sculpture department, and head of the graduate sculpture program. Prior to that, he taught at the School of the Art Institute of Chicago, Kansas City Art Institute, University of California, Berkeley and Bennington College, among other schools.

== Work and reception ==
Snyder's artwork blends abstraction and figuration across multiple media. He produces mainly sculptures and drawings, the latter at times crossing boundaries by appearing on the surface of a sculpture or compound shaped forms. The drawings, which are frequently chaotic and dense with imagery, are said to depict the pool of subject matter from which Snyder draws for his sculptural work. Surface is a focal point of Snyder's artwork, his processes and materials lending themselves to unusual effects such as illumination or the appearance of liquidity. His biomorphic forms range widely in the degree to which they reference reality, and in drawings are often depicted alongside mundane objects such as a mattress or a box. The prevalence of organic imagery and early use of rawhide as a medium are believed by commentators to reflect the influence of Snyder's upbringing on a Pennsylvania farm.

Critics note an emotional charge in Snyder's works, which juxtapose weighty undertones with levity and a sense of the absurd. They have described the works as embodying the unfiltered outpouring of the artist's subconscious mind, using terms such as "disquieting," "uncanny," and "darkly humorous." Cate McQuaid of The Boston Globe described the content of one show as "the sputum of Dean Snyder's fluid and dangerous unconscious." Many of Snyder's forms feature a bulbous, cartoonish style and some are sexually suggestive.

Snyder's works possess a suspended animation quality according to critics, who have described his approach as a subversive analog to photography. Some of his sculptures reference stop-action photography in that they appear to freeze moving subjects in time. The artist has publicly commented on his longstanding interest in photography and its influence on his work.

=== Sculpture ===
Snyder is best known for two sculptural bodies of work—his sewn rawhide sculptures developed prior to the early 2000s and the glossy, organic creations he has produced since. The rawhide works have an air-filled look, appearing variously as abstracted versions of pierced or tufted cushions and half-deflated dirigibles, which Snyder creates through a lengthy process in which he soaks the rawhide, then stretches and shapes, sews, inflates, dries and finishes it. The translucency of the medium in combination with Snyder's surface treatments gives the work a luminous appearance.

Dean Snyder, Daphne's Pendant, candy and metal flake auto paint over epoxy composite and carbon fiber, 120" x 32" x 32", 2008; Collection: RISD Museum.

Pugg (1994) is an inflated, amorphously shaped piece which suggests the illusion of being constrained by barbed wire, the image of which is tattooed onto its surface. Slouch (1997) resembles an air mattress suspended mid-inflation, its half-upright appearance mimicking corporeal life. Turk (1998) presents as a flotation-aid-like infinity knot. The seemingly tightly inflated Joop (2001)—shaped like a large-scale turkey baster—is impaled pincushion-style with pieces of lathe-carved wood in the style of bagpipe chanters. At its debut in the 2001 DeCordova Annual Exhibition the piece was suspended in hot-air-balloon fashion off the floor, its apparent weightlessness serving as a counterpoint to a nearby floor piece, Boogle (2001), which resembles a large tufted cushion pierced at the seams by wooden corks. Critics note both grisly and comical undertones in these works. Where tattooed skin invokes holocaust imagery, Snyder's absurdly uncomfortable, bulbous figures with onomatopoeic names recall the abject humor of cartoons.

Snyder's post-2005 sculpture represents a significant departure from his earlier work. Where in the rawhide era he employed natural materials to depict non-natural forms, the newer work references organic forms using synthetics. Many of these biomorphic subjects present with a high-shine finish evoking liquid or mucosal surfaces, which Snyder creates through the multi-layer application and honing of automotive paint and urethane finish (e.g., Daphne's Pendant, 2008). Carbon fiber and foam create structure and form.

The works blend abstraction with clear representational elements derived from nature, such as flowers, rocks and trees. Khronos (2007) is a yellow-crusted nugget broken on one end to reveal a meat-like interior. In Kuya's Shade (2007), a steel spider web hangs from a six-foot, carbon-fiber tree limb mounted on an abstracted root. Two other large webbed pieces, Arachne's Arcade (2008) and MiddleWay (2014) appeared at their respective exhibitions hanging in doorframes. Snyder uses a water-jet technology to cut the webs from stainless steel.

Other works give the impression of fluidic ooze. Amnesia (2008) features a translucent crop of abstracted red flowers emerging from a puddle of orange substrate. Almost Blue (2008) depicts a geothermal spring apparently frozen in time, with gas bubbles and their resulting droplets in a state of perpetual incompletion. Critics have compared these works to stop-action photography, noting both documentary and subversive elements in Snyder's usage. Photography was an early focus in Snyder's art studies and is regarded as an important influence in his work.

Dean Snyder, Erebos, enamel on museum board and mylar, 39.5" x 31.5", 2006; Collection: Fidelity Investments Smithfield, RI.

=== Drawings ===
Drawing comprises a significant part of Snyder's practice, both as finished artwork and as part of his creative process for sculpture. The media Snyder uses for drawing vary, ranging from traditional graphite and charcoal on paper to ink in rawhide and on polyester film. The drawing subjects range in their level of abstraction, frequently depicting dense agglomerations of semi-abstracted forms in a style that commentators deem energetic.

Critics have noted a chaotic, subconscious quality in Snyder's drawings. An early series of untitled drawings (circa 1998) was described as a simultaneously playful and grisly tangle of mattresses, lumber, kitchen utensils, hinges, belts and genitals. Sensus (2001), a 30-foot-long pencil drawing, was described by Christopher Millis of the Boston Phoenix as "a cornucopia of the id." It features an elaborate, tornado-shaped assemblage of random, interconnected imagery as the exhale of a wooden figure.

Snyder created a body of assemblage drawings with tattoo needle and ink on rawhide sculptures and objects. In one series, he mounted the rawhide on curved Plexiglas frames, which blurred the line between drawing and sculpture and created unusual light effects. Later drawings were more succinct and employed ink on film or paint on museum board. In Erebos (2006/2012), an open cardboard box foregrounds a black tree stump, translucent objects and emissions emerging from its truncated limbs. The work features cut layers of frosted Mylar and alludes to Snyder's past works.

== Recognition and collections ==
Snyder has been awarded artist fellowships or grants from the John Simon Guggenheim Memorial Foundation (2013), Louis Comfort Tiffany Foundation (2009), Berkshire-Taconic Arts Foundation (2008), Rhode Island State Council for the Arts (2004, 2001), National Endowment for the Arts (1995), Vermont State Council for the Arts (1995), Andrew Mellon Foundation (1988), Hawaii State Foundation on Culture and the Arts, and Illinois Arts Council (1982, 1981), among other organizations. He received artist residencies from the Pouch Cove Foundation and Siena Art Institute.

Snyder's work is held in the public collections of the Albany International Airport, City of Beijing, DeCordova Sculpture Park and Museum, Nelson-Atkins Museum of Art, RISD Museum, Smart Museum of Art, Spencer Museum of Art, and Tang Museum, among others.
