= Stephen Sidelinger =

Stephen Sidelinger (born 1947) is an artist/designer/educator/architectural colorist/textile artist/ embroiderer and book artist. He received a B.F.A. in Design from Syracuse University and an M.S. in Design from The Illinois Institute of Technology. His work draws on varied disciplines to create one-of-a-kind, fine, hand bound books of contemporary illuminated manuscripts, which are in public and private collections throughout the world. His work often includes fine and elaborate embroidery. Sidelinger was Professor of Design for 14 years at the Kansas City Art Institute; and later taught at Otis College of Art and Design and at The Art Institute of California, Los Angeles. He currently teaches in the Graphic & Interactive Communication department at Ringling College of Art and Design.

Sidelinger is the author of the book Color Manual published by Prentice-Hall Inc. and is also the artist in residence to Tina Beebe for the renowned L.A. based architectural firm of Charles Moore, John Ruble and Buzz Yudell.
