= Mikel Rouse =

American composer (born 1957)

- Born: Michael Rouse; January 26, 1957 (age 69); St. Louis

Mikel Rouse (born Michael Rouse; January 26, 1957) is an American composer. He has been associated with a Downtown New York City movement known as totalism, and is best known for his operas, including Dennis Cleveland, about a television talk show host, which Rouse wrote and starred in.

== Early life, family and education ==
Rouse was born in St. Louis, Missouri, US, the son of a Missouri state trooper. He was raised in Poplar Bluff, Missouri, in the state's Bootheel region. Early in his life, he decided to change the spelling of his first name to "Mikel," to more accurately represent the name's pronunciation. He studied painting and film at the Kansas City Art Institute as well as music at the University of Missouri–Kansas City.

== Music ==
When the avant-garde rock band Talking Heads played in Kansas City, Missouri, in 1978, Rouse's band Tirez Tirez was the only local band progressive enough to open for them. Tirez Tirez relocated to New York City in 1979 and continued performing until 1987. Meanwhile, Rouse absorbed African rhythmic techniques from A. M. Jones's Studies in African Music, and studied Schillinger technique with Jerome Walman, one of the few Certified Schillinger Teachers in America; both influences came to inform his music. In addition to Tirez Tirez he formed a new ensemble, Mikel Rouse Broken Consort, to work out his new rhythmic language in the context of rock-based instrumentation, making him one of the first composers to notate intricate music for rock group. Rouse's association with Ben Neill and Kyle Gann in New York City in the early 1990s led to the recognition of a new rhythmic complexity in minimalist-based music that came to be referred to as totalism.

Rouse writes music that is idiomatically and stylistically indebted to popular music, yet he uses complex rhythmic techniques derived from world music, the avant-garde and minimalism, including a technique he calls "counterpoetry" in which separate lines of a song sung by separate characters or groups are set to phrases of differing lengths (such as 9 and 10 beats) and often played over a background time signature of 4/4. Metric sleight of hand, simple in concept but often complex in perception, is common. One of the basic rhythms of Rouse's opera Failing Kansas is a five-beat isorhythm (rhythmic ostinato) against which either the harmony or drum pattern often reinforces the four- or eight-beat meter.

Frustrated by the lack of institutional support for Downtown music, Rouse has made an ambitious bid for composer self-sufficiency. In 1995 he premiered a one-man opera Failing Kansas, based on the Clutter murders and their portrayal in Truman Capote's In Cold Blood, and in 2000 he produced an entire film with music by himself, rather pointedly titled Funding. In an opposite direction, he premiered a technologically innovative opera, Dennis Cleveland, at The Kitchen in 1996. It is based on a talk show format and with some of the singers/actors spread out among the audience, though with a dense libretto drawn from John Ralston Saul's critique of Western society in the latter's book Voltaire's Bastards. In 2002, the opera was performed at Lincoln Center.

He collaborated with Ben Neill on The Demo, based on "The Mother of All Demos", a technological demonstration of 1968. It was performed in 2015 at the Bing Concert Hall of Stanford University. He received a Foundation for Contemporary Arts Grants to Artists award in 2001.

== Discography ==
- 1980 Etudes
- 1983 Story of the Year
- 1983 Under the Door/Sleep
- 1984 Jade Tiger
- 1984 Colorado Suite
- 1984 Quorum
- 1985 A Walk in the Woods
- 1986 Set the Timer/Uptight
- 1986 Social Responsibility
- 1988 A Lincoln Portrait
- 1988 Against All Flags
- 1993 Soul Menu
- 1994 Autorequiem
- 1994 Living Inside Design
- 1995 Failing Kansas
- 1996 Dennis Cleveland: An Opera
- 1999 Return
- 2000 Century XXI: Electronics USA 1, with Carl Stone, Ben Neill, Kyle Gann
- 2001 Funding
- 2001 Cameraworld
- 2005 The End of Cinematics
- 2005 Music for Minorities
- 2005 Test Tones
- 2006 House of Fans
- 2006 Love at Twenty
- 2006 International Cloud Atlas, for the Merce Cunningham Dance Company
- 2009 Gravity Radio
- 2010 Recess
- 2010 Corner Loading (vol.1)
- 2012 Boost|False Doors
- 2012 False Doors|Boost
- 2013 Ambulance Chaser
- 2013 The Law of Average
- 2013 Mayan Yours/I Dry Gin
- 2013 Dawn/Tears of Joy
- 2016 Take Down
- 2017 Hemisphere
- 2019 Swingers Castle
- 2020 Community Spread

== See also ==
- Tirez Tirez
- Minimalist music
- Schillinger System
