= Eric Sall =

American artist

- Education: Kansas City Art Institute (BFA); Virginia Commonwealth University (MFA)
- Occupation: Artist

Eric Sall is an American artist from South Dakota.

== Education ==
Sall attended the Yale Summer Program in 1998, graduated from the Kansas City Art Institute in 1999 with a Bachelor of Fine Arts degree. He continued his education at Virginia Commonwealth University, and graduated with a Master of Fine Arts in 2006.

== Awards ==
Sall has received a Joan Mitchell Foundation Grant and a Virginia Museum of Fine Arts Fellowship.

== Exhibitions ==
He has exhibited in shows including The Triumph of Painting at the Saatchi Gallery in London, The RAIR Paintings at Roswell Museum and Art Center and From The Root To The Fruit at Alona Kagan Gallery in New York. He is represented by ATM Gallery in New York City, Dolphin Gallery in Kansas City and ADA Gallery in Richmond.

His work is held in the collections of the Daum Museum of Contemporary Art, Sedalia, Missouri. and Nerman Museum of Contemporary Art, Overland Park, Kansas,

== Art reviews ==
Sall's art exhibits have been reviewed by Kansas City arts magazine The Pitch, the Seattle Times, and the Village Voice.
