= Susan Mastrangelo =

American artist

- Born: 1951 (age 74–75); New York City, New York, US
- Education: Boston University, Kansas City Art Institute, New York Studio School
- Known for: Painting, sculpture, installation art, collage, printmaking
- Awards: Pollock-Krasner Foundation, Elizabeth Foundation for the Arts
- Website: Susan Mastrangelo

Susan Mastrangelo, Shining Lights, knitting, recycled fabric, upholstery cord, acrylic paint on wood panel, 60" x 48", 2020.

Susan Mastrangelo (born 1951) is an American visual artist and educator whose artwork has included mixed-media paintings, sculpture, installations and printmaking. Her earlier work centered on sculpture and installations, most commonly expressive, sculpted heads and flat, stylized groupings of figures that ranged freely between representation and abstraction. Critics suggest that since 2015, her paintings, collages and monoprints have embraced immediacy, organic abstract form, and diverse materials including knitting, upholstery cord, recycled patterned fabrics and paint.

Mastrangelo has been recognized with awards from the Pollock-Krasner Foundation and New York Studio School, and as a visiting artist and scholar by the American Academy in Rome. She is based in Brooklyn and Catskill, New York.

== Early life and career ==
Mastrangelo was born in 1951 in New York City, and raised there and in Washington DC. She received formal training in painting (e.g., still lifes, figurative compositions, landscapes) at the New York Studio School (1973) and Kansas City Art Institute, receiving a BFA from the former in 1974. She earned an MFA from Boston University in 1977, studying under Philip Guston, who encouraged a more personal and emotional, rather than formal, approach. After relocating to New York City, Mastrangelo appeared in exhibitions at A.I.R. Gallery, Art in General, Art Resources, and the Islip Art Museum, among others, in her first professional decades.

In addition to her artmaking, Mastrangelo taught at the Buckley School in New York City from 1991 to 2017, and chaired its art department from 2000 to 2017. She also taught at Fisher College in Boston.

== Work and reception ==
=== Early work and exhibitions ===
Mastrangelo focused on the human figure in her early career. The work in her first two decades ranged from paintings of faceless, stylized people—often marching single-file through her compositions of the 1980s—to wood and plaster figurative sculptures whose stiff, restrained gestures conveyed a muted emotional quality. In the early 1990s, these sculptures evolved into a larger-than-life-sized series of long, narrow, mainly abstract totem pieces made of wood, wax, lead, steel and paint.

Susan Mastrangelo, Head Shot, clay and sculpey, 2" x 2" each head, 2003–06. Selection from wall installation of 350 heads.

Beginning in 1997, Mastrangelo turned from large sculpture to small, expressive modeled and painted heads. Between 1999 and 2006, she often exhibited them posted directly to walls in large groupings or grids (some numbering up to 350) that reviewers described as cross-sections or ethnographic-like presentations of human expression. The heads were quickly jabbed and pinched out of clay, yet contained surprising specificity, including details such as dreadlocks, glasses, braids and bows. On an individual level, critics noted them for their lumpy humor and unnerving emotional impact, while describing the effect en masse as both macabre and communal. For the 2003, New York Vision Festival, Mastrangelo created an installation of large-scale, highly hung heads constructed out of plaster, wood, paint, burlap, hemp, wire and resin that reviewer Tina Seligman likened to departed souls or an ancient Greek chorus "silently echoing despair, anger, strength and resilience." She also collaborated with poet Geoffrey O'Brien on an exhibition and book, Heads in Limbo (2011), in which he supplemented her heads with poignant, self-mocking and wise caption-verses. In 2019, after turning to other work for more than a decade, she returned to the heads in installations at the City-Museum of Neuötting and Schauraum K3 in Germany.

Between 2009 and 2019, Mastrangelo produced collages, reliefs and installations depicting silhouetted women in motion or carrying out daily routines, which served as metaphors, variously, of the human condition, past struggles, contemporary living and the vibrancy of New York pedestrian life. Taking a range of forms—flat, freestanding fiberglass and fabric figures, drawings on mylar or hanging scrim, linocut prints—this work included the exhibitions "Slice of Life" (Taft School, 2009) and "Motion Pictures" (2012, Melville House), a collaboration with poet Albert Mobilio; Indomitable (2017), an installation for the show "A Declaration of Sentiments," honoring the centennial of women's suffrage in New York; and Pulse (2019), a colorful, upbeat site-specific installation for the Sloan Kettering Brooklyn Infusion Center.

=== Mixed media paintings and monoprints (2015–present) ===
Mastrangelo's later work has taken an increasingly abstract direction. In a series of barely figurative collages—some presented in The Painting Center show "Ulterior Motif" (2015)—she adhered shapes of brightly patterned fabrics to fiberglass scrim, offering a glimpse of the Pattern and Decoration movement's influence on her work (e.g., Standing Alone and Destination Freedom, both 2016). Her monoprints exhibit a similar impulse, featuring simple organic shapes made with mylar templates that overlap through multiple printings to create a sense of immediacy and spiraling, urban energy and color (e.g., Breaking Barriers #7, 2020).

In 2020, while in seclusion due to the COVID-19 pandemic, Mastrangelo turned to knitting—initially for comfort, but eventually in extensions of her collage works. She created vivid, visceral rectangular paintings in which materials such as yarn, upholstery cord and fabric took the leading role over paint. Working intuitively, she "drew" on wood panels with upholstery cording of various weights using the energy of robust, sinuous lines to dictate the rhythms, biomorphic shapes and voids of the compositions (e.g., Shining Lights, 2021). Over these drawings, she painted and collaged with patterned fabrics and meshes, developing a dense, complex pictorial vocabulary with trompe l'oeil, shadowing, depth and textural effects. In an Artforum review of the solo show, "Safe At Home" (2021, 490 Atlantic), Barry Schwabsky wrote of this work, "These meshes expand, contract, twist and overlap, lending the compositions their delicious convolutions. More than a hundred years after the fact, Mastrangelo shows there’s still inspiration to be drawn from, of all things, Synthetic Cubism."

== Recognition ==
Mastrangelo has received awards and grants from the New York Studio School (Mercedes Matter Award, 2020), Elizabeth Foundation for the Arts (2000–05) and Pollock-Krasner Foundation (1990, 1987). She has been selected as a visiting artist or artist-in-residence at the American Academy in Rome, Civitella Ranieri Foundation (Italy), Ragdale Foundation, Triangle Workshop, Tyrone Guthrie Centre (Ireland), Virginia Center for the Creative Arts, and Yaddo.
