= Kansas City Art Institute =

Private art school in Kansas City, Missouri, U.S.

Coordinates: 39.046253°N 94.58308°W

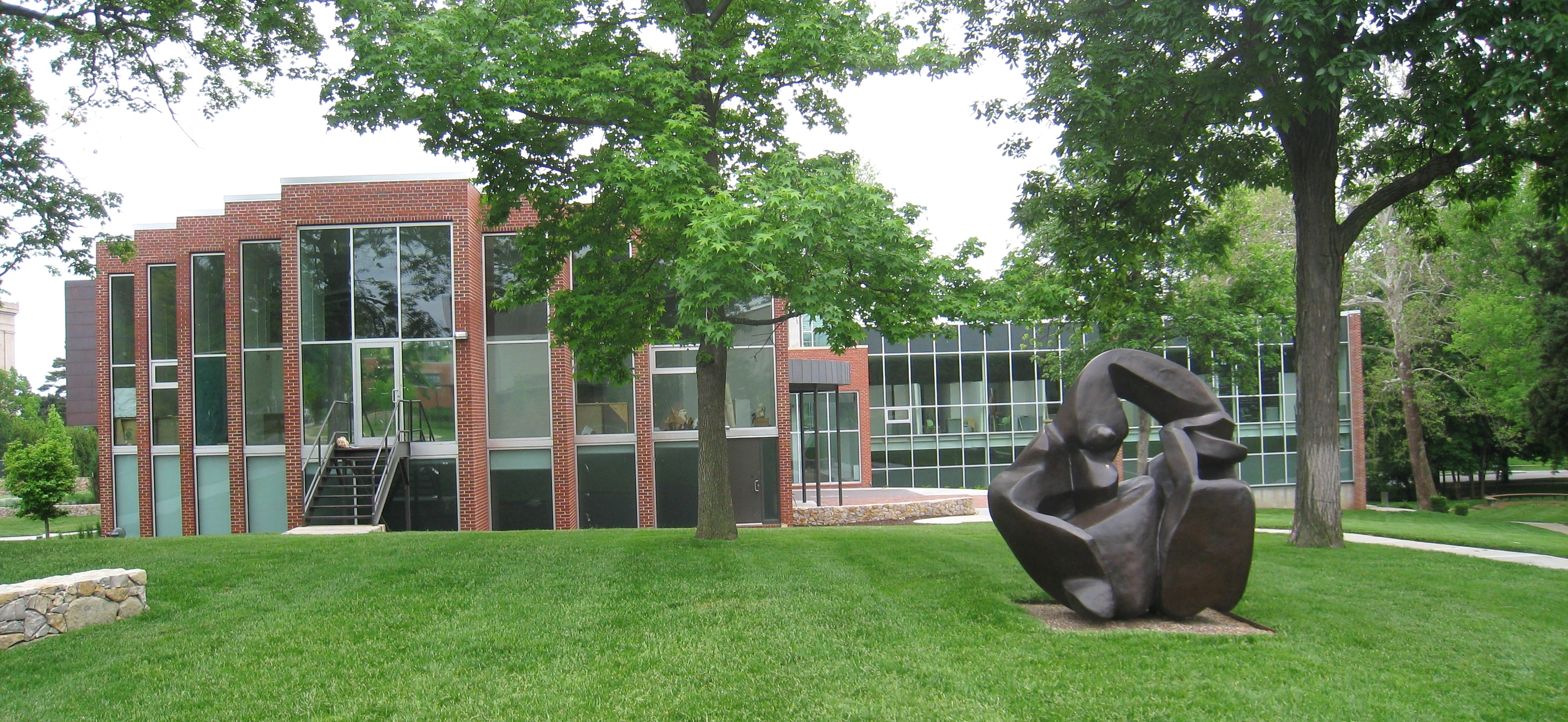
- The campus green at Kansas City Art Institute
- Former name: Fine Arts Institute of Kansas City
- Type: Private art school
- Established: 1885; 141 years ago
- Academic affiliations: Association of Independent Colleges of Art and Design
- President: Peggy Shannon
- Academic staff: 75
- Students: 813 (fall 2024)
- Location: Kansas City, Missouri, U.S.
- Website: kcai.edu

The Kansas City Art Institute (KCAI) is a private art school in Kansas City, Missouri. The college was founded in 1885 and is an accredited by the National Association of Schools of Art and Design and Higher Learning Commission. The institute has approximately 75 faculty members and 700 students, and offers a Bachelor of Fine Arts degree.

== History ==
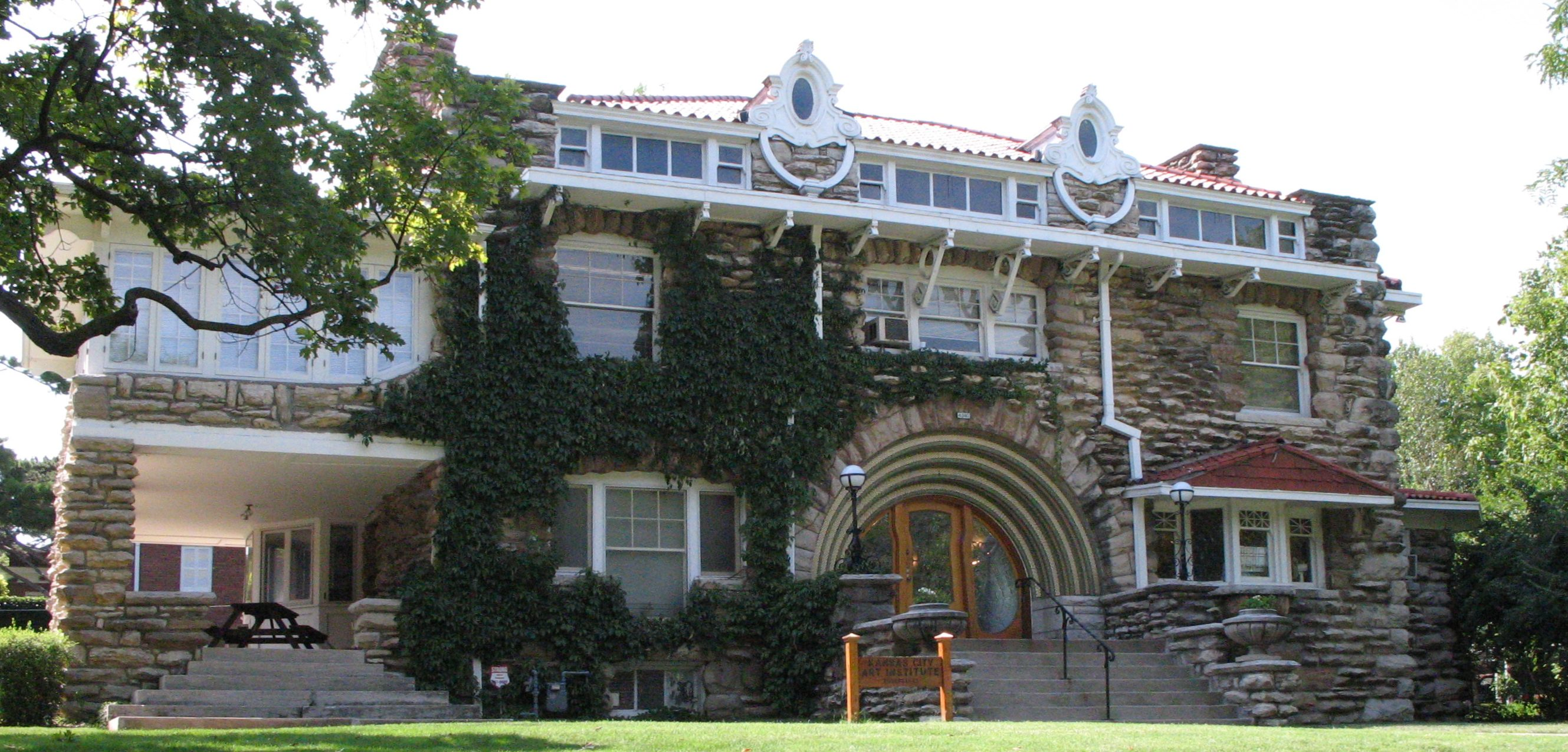
Mineral Hall at the Kansas City Art Institute

The school was founded in 1885 when art enthusiasts formed the "Sketch Club" with the purpose of "talking over art matters in general and to judge pictures." Meetings were originally in private homes and then moved to the Deardorf Building at 11th and Main in downtown Kansas City. The club had its first exhibition in 1887 and 12 benefactors stepped forward to form the Kansas City Art Association and School of Design.

In 1927, Howard Vanderslice purchased the August R. Meyer residence, a Germanic castle entitled Marburg and its 8-acre (3.24 ha) estate at 44th and Warwick Boulevard adjacent to the planned Nelson-Atkins Museum of Art. A Wight and Wight addition was added to the building. The residence was later renamed "Vanderslice Hall" and is listed on the National Register of Historic Places along with another building on the campus—Mineral Hall. The campus has since expanded to 15 acres (6.07 ha).

In 1935, painter Thomas Hart Benton left New York City to teach at the school. Among the artists Benton influenced as a teacher at KCAI were Frederic James, Margot Peet, Jackson Lee Nesbitt, Roger Medearis, Glenn Gant, and Delmer J. Yoakum. Though Benton brought attention to the Art Institute, he was dismissed in 1941 after making disparaging references to, as he claimed, the excessive influence of homosexuals in the art world.

In 1992, the Kemper Museum of Contemporary Art opened on the west side of the campus. On the occasion of its 130th anniversary in 2015, the Kansas City Art Institute received an anonymous donation of $25 million, one of the largest gifts ever to an American art school. The money will be used to bolster the school's general endowment, improve and renovate its campus adjacent to the Nelson-Atkins Museum of Art and, in the form of a challenge grant of $6 million, sharply increase the number of scholarships the school is able to give out.

== Notable faculty ==
- Thomas Hart Benton – Leader of Regionalist art movement; KCAI professor, (1935–1941)
- Anne Boyer – Pulitzer Prize Winning Author and Poet
- Harold Bruder – Painter (1963–1965)
- Christiane Cegavske - Guggenheim Fellow in 2019
- John de Martelly – Regionalist Printmaker, (1934–1941)
- Jill Downen (‘89 Painting) - Guggenheim Fellow in 2010
- Dale Eldred – Sculptor, Environmentalist; Professor and Chair of Sculpture at KCAI (1959–1993)
- Ken Ferguson – Ceramicist, KCAI Professor Emeritus, (1964–1996)
- Glenn Gant – Regionalist painter, KCAI alumni and student of Benton, KCAI teacher, (1948–1960)
- Frederic James – Watercolor Painter, KCAI teacher, (1940–1950)
- Rob Roy Kelly - Graphic Designer and Printmaker, Chair of the Graphic Design Department (1964–1972)
- Cyan Meeks – Filmmaker and Video Artist
- Wilbur Niewald – Watercolor Painter, chairman of the Painting and Printmaking Department (starting 1959), Senior Professor of Painting (the first in the college's history, 1985)
- Victor Papanek – UNESCO (United Nations Educational Scientific and Cultural Organization) Designer/Mediator; Author; Chair of Graphic Design Department (1976–1980)
- John Douglas Patrick – Painter, Draughtsman, KCAI teacher circa 1909–1936, member French Salon 1886–1889, Earned Bronze Medal 1889 Universal Exposition
- Stephen Sidelinger – Professor of Design (1972–1989)

== Notable lecturers ==
- Elaine de Kooning – painter and visiting critic (February to March 1965)

== Notable alumni ==
- R. H. Barlow (Attended 1938)– author, anthropologist
- Eric Bransby (1942 Painting) – muralist, painter
- Paul Briggs (1996 Illustration) – animator and storyboard artist for Walt Disney Animation Studios
- Ellen Carey (1974 Printmaking) – photographer and professor
- Nick Cave ('82 Fiber) – performance artist
- Dan Christensen (1964 Painting) – painter
- James Claussen (1975 Painting) – lithographer
- Richard Corben (1962 Design) – comic book creator
- John Steuart Curry (Attended 1914) – painter
- Marc Davis – (attended 1927) animator, Imagineer at Disney
- Marisol Deluna (1989 Fiber) – fashion designer
- Walt Disney – animator, media entrepreneur, (attended Saturday classes as a child) received honorary degree from KCAI
- Karon Doherty (1979 Ceramics) – ceramicist
- Angela Dufresne (1991 Painting) – painter
- Ellen Fullman (1979 Sculpture) – inventor of Long-String instrument
- Karen Glaser – photographer
- April Greiman (1970 Graphic Design) – graphic designer, known for bringing the New Wave design style to America
- Amelia Ishmael (2004, Photography, Art History) – artist, art critic, curator, black metal specialist
- Jay Jackson (1975 Photo/Video) – animator for Walt Disney Animation Studios
- Paul Jenkins – painter (attended classes as a child)
- Christian Holstad (1994 Ceramics) – conceptual artist
- Peregrine Honig (2019 Painting) – artist and entrepreneur
- Dennis Hopper – actor, attended Saturday classes during high school
- Suzanne Klotz (1964 Painting) – painter, sculptor
- Barry Kooser (1991 Illustration) – artist, painter, animation filmmaker, background artist for Walt Disney Animation Studios
- Arthur Kraft (attended 1952) – sculptor and painter
- Frank S. Land (attended c. 1909), former Imperial Potentate of the Shriners, founder of the Order of DeMolay
- Ronnie Landfield (1963 Painting) – abstract painter
- Doris Lee (1925 Painting) – Depression-era figurative painter
- Roberto Lugo (2012 Ceramics) – potter and educator
- Jim Mahfood (1997 Illustration)– comic book and graffiti artist
- Duard Marshall (1940 Painting) - Painter, lithographer, art restorer
- Susan Mastrangelo (1974) – sculptor and painter
- Christina McPhee (‘76 Painting) – new media artist
- Roger Medearis (attended 1938-1941) – Regionalist painter, student of Thomas Hart Benton
- Cyan Meeks (1995 New Media) – video artist and filmmaker
- Robert Morris (attended) – sculptor, performance and installation artist
- Jackson Lee Nesbitt (attended) – artist known for regionalist etchings and lithographs, student of Benton
- William F. Nolan (attended) – screenwriter, original Twilight Zone co-author
- Theo Parrish (1995 Photo/Video) – musician and DJ
- Margot Peet (attended) – painter, student of Thomas Hart Benton
- Chris Pitman (attended) - musician, Guns N’ Roses member
- Donna Polseno (1972 Ceramics) – ceramic artist
- Sam Prekop (attended) – photographer, musician with The Sea and Cake
- Archer Prewitt (1985 Painting) – illustrator, musician with The Sea and Cake and The Coctails
- Robert Rauschenberg (attended 1946 -1948) – painter
- Glen Rounds (attended) – author and illustrator
- Mikel Rouse (1979 Painting) – musician with Tirez Tirez, developed Totalism (music)
- Eric Sall (1999 Painting) – painter
- Nelson Shanks (attended) – painter
- Dean Snyder (1978 Sculpture and Photography) – sculptor
- Nancy Speir – children's book illustrator
- Marjorie Strider (1952 Painting) – painter
- Jim Suptic (attended 1996–1997) – sculptor, musician
- Akio Takamori (1976 Ceramics) – ceramic artist
- Marc Tedeschi (1981 Design) – martial artist, designer, photographer, writer, educator
- Robert Templeton (attended) – painter, painted the portrait of President Carter in the National Portrait Gallery
- Stanley Whitney (1968 Painting) - painter
- Christopher Willits (2000 Photo/New Media) – musician, sound and multimedia artist
- Kathryn Zaremba (2008 Interdisciplinary Art) - former Full House and Toothless star
- Arnie Zimmerman (1977 Ceramics) – ceramicist
