= Jill Downen =

- Born: 1967 (age 58–59); Belleville, Illinois, United States
- Education: Kansas City Art Institute (BFA), Washington University in St. Louis (MFA)
- Occupations: sculptor and installation artist
- Known for: works in white plaster
- Notable work: assistant professor of sculpture at the Kansas City Art Institute
- Awards: Guggenheim Fellowship

Jill Downen (born 1967) is an American sculptor and installation artist, and an associate professor of sculpture at the Kansas City Art Institute. She received a Guggenheim Fellowship in 2010.

She was born in Belleville, Illinois in 1967, the daughter of a sign painter. She was awarded a BFA in painting from Kansas City Art Institute in 1989 and an MFA in sculpture from the Sam Fox School of Design & Visual Arts at Washington University in St. Louis in 2001.

She commonly works in white plaster. According to Ivy Cooper, Downen "has made a career of exploring the intersection of bodies and architecture".

Her exhibitions include Hard Hat Optional at Bruno David Gallery, St. Louis in 2009, (dis)Mantle at Luminary Center for the Arts, St. Louis, in 2010, and Three Dimensional Sketchbook at Plug Projects, Kansas City in 2013.
