= Totalism =

Genre of art music

Totalism is a style of art music that arose in the 1980s and 1990s as a response to minimalism. It paralleled postminimalism but involved a younger generation of creators, born in the 1950s. This term, invented by writer and composer Kyle Gann, has not been adopted by contemporary musicology and generally still refers only to Gann's use of it in his writings.

== Early 1980s ==
In the early 1980s, many young composers began writing music within the static confines of minimalism, but using greater rhythmic complexity, often with two or more simultaneous tempos (or implied tempos) audible at once. The style acquired a name around 1990, when it became evident to composers working in New York City that a number of them, including John Luther Adams, Glenn Branca, Rhys Chatham, Kyle Gann, Michael Gordon, Arthur Jarvinen, Bernadette Speach, Ben Neill, Larry Polansky, Mikel Rouse, and Evan Ziporyn, were employing similar types of global tempo structures in their music. Others include Eve Beglarian, Allison Cameron, Nick Didkovsky, David First, Phil Kline, and Lois V. Vierk.

The term totalist refers to the aims of the music, in trying to have enough surface rhythmic energy, but also to contain enough background complexity. There is also an echo in the term of serialism's "total organization," here drawn not from the 12-tone row, but from Henry Cowell's theories about using the same structuring devices for rhythm that have been traditionally used for pitch. For instance, the traditional ratio between frequencies of a major second interval is 9:8, and 9-against-8 is an important tempo contrast in many totalist pieces, achieved by having some instruments play dotted eighth notes while others play triplet half notes. In practice, totalist music can be consonant, dissonant, or both, but generally restricts itself to a small number of sonorities within any given piece.

== Examples ==
Examples of works in the totalist idiom include:

- Mikel Rouse: Quick Thrust, Failing Kansas, Dennis Cleveland (a talk-show opera), The End of Cinematics
- Glenn Branca: The Ascension
- Michael Gordon: Thou Shalt!/Thou Shalt Not!, Acid Rain, Four Kings Fight Five, Van Gogh Video Opera, Trance
- Rhys Chatham: An Angel Moves Too Fast to See
- John Luther Adams: Dream in White on White, Clouds of Forgetting, Clouds of Unknowing, In The White Silence
- Kyle Gann: Long Night, Custer and Sitting Bull, Unquiet Night
- Ben Neill: 678 Streams, ITSOFOMO
- Bernadette Speach: Telepathy Suite
- Larry Polansky: Lonesome Road
