= Glenn Gant =

American painter

Glenn Gant (1911–1999) was a painter who was best known for his Regionalist and American Scene paintings.

Gant was born in Kansas City, Missouri in 1911. He began his art career at the Kansas City Art Institute in 1930, and he studied under famed Regionalist artist Thomas Hart Benton in the mid- to late 1930s. In the 1930s and 1940s, Gant became widely known in his own right for his regionalist paintings of Missouri, Kansas, Oklahoma and Arkansas. World War II interrupted his career, as he served as an infantryman in the U.S. Army. Gant returned to Kansas City after the war and was a member of the Art Institute's faculty until 1960. During the early 1950s Gant studied at the University of the Americas in Mexico City. His work of the time was influenced by Mexican artists David Alfaro Siqueiros and Diego Rivera. In 1960, Gant moved to Eureka Springs, Arkansas, where he continued to paint until his death in 1999. Gant's paintings are in many notable private collections throughout the country.
