= Roger Medearis =

American Regionalist painter

- Born: March 6, 1920; Fayette, Missouri
- Died: July 5, 2001 (aged 81); San Marino, California
- Education: Kansas City Art Institute
- Known for: egg tempera painting
- Notable work: Godly Susan
- Movement: Regionalist painter

Roger Medearis (March 6, 1920 – July 5, 2001) was an American Regionalist painter.

== Career ==
He was a student of Thomas Hart Benton while at the Kansas City Art Institute in the late 1930s and took up the technique of egg tempera painting, a rediscovered medium popular with Regionalists. Benton introduced Medearis to the Associated American Artists Gallery in New York City, from which he sold a portrait of his grandmother, Godly Susan, now in the collection of the Smithsonian Museum of American Art.

After World War II, Regionalist art fell out of fashion, replaced by Abstract Expressionism. Unable to sell his works, Medearis stopped painting. In 1966, Philip Desind, a Maryland art dealer, discovered Medearis' work and encouraged him to return to painting. Medearis painted new works until his death in 2001.

Medearis' paintings and lithographs can be found in the collections of the Butler Institute of American Art, the Kemper Museum of Contemporary Art, the Nelson-Atkins Museum of Art, and the Smithsonian Museum of American Art. He also has a painting hanging next to one of Thomas Hart Benton at the Huntington Library in San Marino, CA. His later years were spent in San Marino with his wife and children.
