= Suzanne Klotz =

American artist (born 1944)

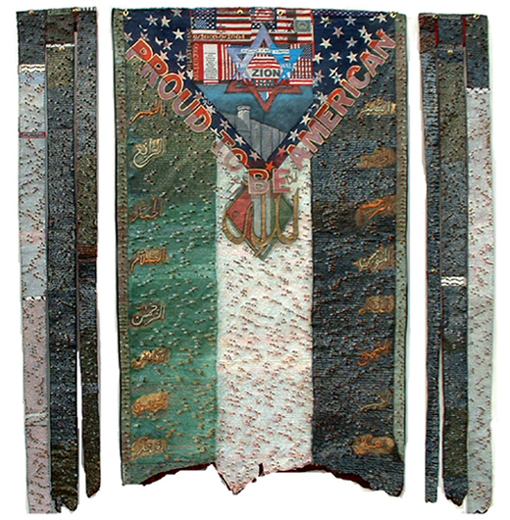
2 Shuhada, 90x110 inches, canvas, embroidery, bullet tips

Suzanne Klotz (born 1944) is an American painter and sculptor active in Arizona.

== Career ==
Klotz was born in 1944 in Shawano, Wisconsin. Klotz attended Washington University in St. Louis for two years of undergraduate education. She holds a BFA Degree from the Kansas City Art Institute, MFA Degree from Texas Tech University, and Secondary Teaching Certification from the University of Missouri Kansas City.

In 1990, Klotz was an artist-in-residence and arts consultant at the Jerry Mason Memorial Aborigine Centre in Berri, South Australia. Between 1990 and 1996 she arranged exhibitions and art collaborations between Israeli and Palestinian artists during guest artist residencies at Mishkenot Sha'ananim, a non-governmental, non-political, International Cultural Centre in Jerusalem.

Klotz has established multi-cultural art programs, workshops, and exhibitions in several countries including Australia, Africa, Mexico, Taiwan, Israel, Palestine, and the United States.

== Recognition ==
Klotz received the 2013-14 Bi-National Fulbright Scholar Award (Aman, Jordan). Other grants and awards include the Pollock-Krasner Foundation, the Puffin Foundation, Change Inc, the New York Artists' Fellowship, Capelli d'Angeli Foundation, the National Endowment for the Arts, Arizona Artists' 3-D Fellowship, an Arizona Governor's Award for Women Who Create and Educate, a City Improvement Award for a commissioned public park sculpture, and Texas Tech University's Most Distinguished 2-D Graduate Alumni Award. In addition, the Palestine Children's Welfare Fund established a Palestinian Educators Scholarship Endowed Fund dedicated to Suzanne Klotz.

Klotz's academic appointments include universities and colleges in Arizona, California, Texas and Utah. Her art has been exhibited in over 300 exhibitions internationally since 1972 and is in numerous private and public collections including the Smithsonian Museum of American Art, the El Paso Museum of Art, and the Phoenix Art Museum.
