= Ben Neill =

American classical composer

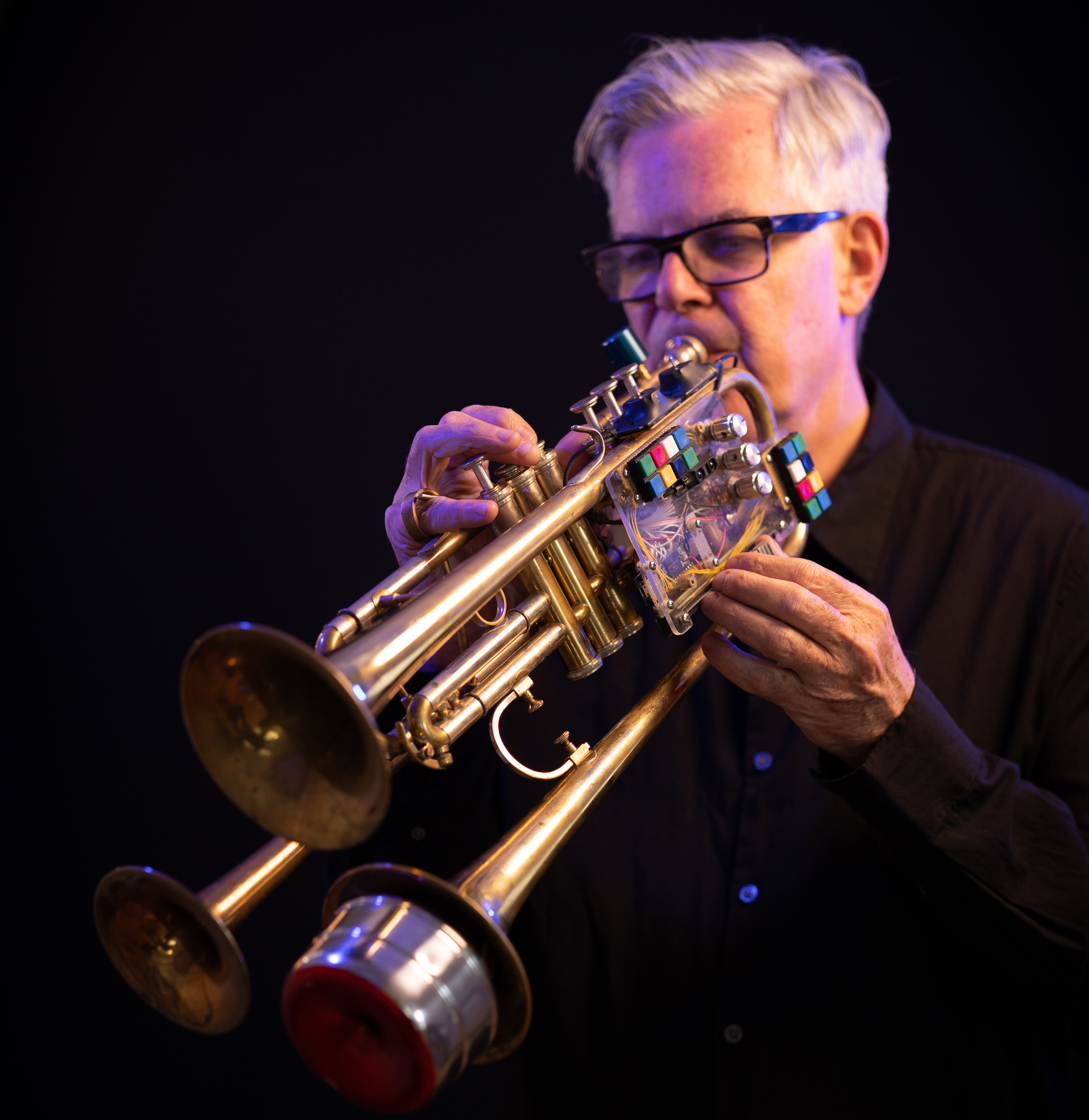
Ben Neill and the Mutantrumpet

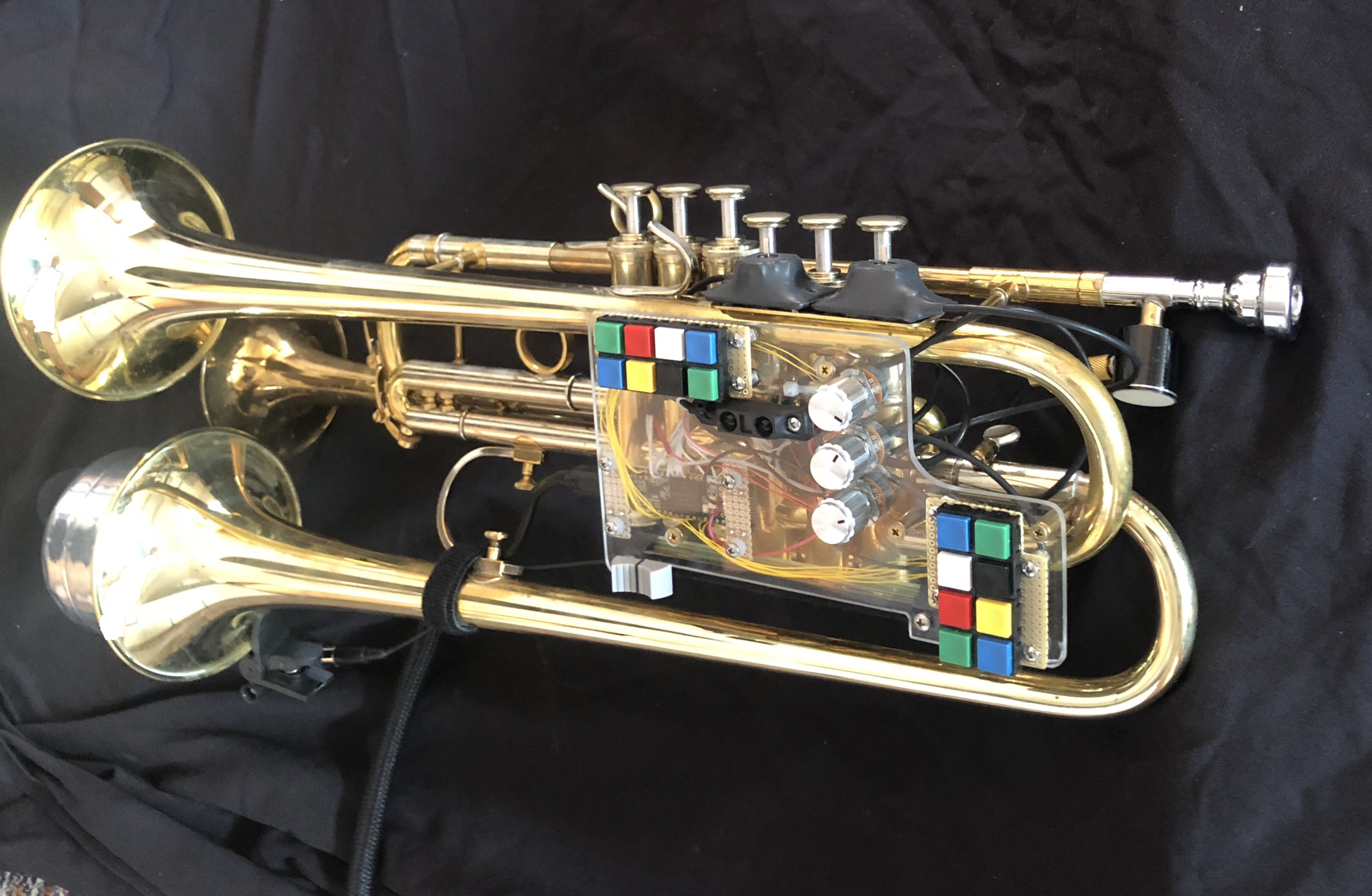
Ben Neill's Mutantrumpet V4

Ben Neill (born November 14, 1957) is an American composer, trumpeter, producer, author, and educator. He is the inventor of the "Mutantrumpet", a hybrid electro-acoustic instrument.

== Early life, family and education ==
Neill was born in Winston-Salem, North Carolina. His early studies included the North Carolina School of the Arts and Eastern Music Festival, where he played alongside many notable young musicians including Wynton Marsalis. He attended the Dana School of Music at Youngstown State University, where he earned Bachelor of Music and Master of Music degrees. His primary trumpet teacher was Esotto Pellegrini, but he also studied trumpet with Bernard Adelstein and James Darling. In 1983 he moved to New York City, and earned a Doctorate of Musical Arts degree from Manhattan School of Music. He also studied privately with La Monte Young and was mentored by Jon Hassell.

== Career ==
In 1980 Neill formed The B-Minors, a new wave band with drummer Don Yallech, and became an active participant in the Northeast Ohio punk/new wave scene, frequently performing at The Bank in Akron, JB's in Kent, and the Cedars in Youngstown. Neill began writing his own music and developed the prototype for his signature invention, the Mutantrumpet, in this context. The Mutantrumpet is a modified acoustic trumpet with extra bells and valves as well as electronic modifications that allow him to control digital audio and video with his playing. The first Mutantrumpet (1981) had three bells, six valves, a trombone slide and an analog processing system custom built by synthesizer inventor Robert Moog. In 1985 he first travelled to Amsterdam's STEIM Studios to develop a new, MIDI-capable Mutantrumpet; the upgrade resulted in the advances in the number of switches, knobs, and pressure-sensitive pads allowing the player to trigger and modify a variety of sounds and sequences, as well as lights and projections. David Behrman also designed a computer program to facilitate Neill's live performances. In 2008, Neill completed a new version of his instrument during another residency at STEIM. In 2014, he returned to Amsterdam to design V4, which made its debut in 2019.

In 1984, Neill completed Orbs, his first significant composition for Mutantrumpet, percussion, and audiovisual projections; other early pieces include 1985's Mainspring, 1987's Money Talk, and 1988's Abblasen House, composed for an ensemble of brass, electric guitar, and percussion. ITSOFOMO (In the Shadow of Forward Motion) is a major multimedia work created in collaboration with visual artist David Wojnarowicz in 1989.

Neill's music has been recorded on the Universal/Verve, Astralwerks, Thirsty Ear, Six Degrees, Ramseur, New Tone and Ear-Rational labels. In 1996, he contributed to the AIDS benefit album Offbeat: A Red Hot Soundtrip, produced by the Red Hot Organization. In 1999, he was included in the Wired magazine compilation Music Futurists. He has collaborated with DJ Spooky, David Wojnarowicz, Page Hamilton, Mimi Goese and Nicolas Collins, and performed on albums by David Behrman, John Cale and Rhys Chatham.

Neill collaborated with visual artist Bill Jones to create Palladio, an interactive movie based on Jonathan Dee’s 2002 novel of the same name. Palladio premiered in 2005 at the New Territories Festival in Glasgow, Scotland, and at the Leonard Nimoy Thalia at Symphony Space in New York City. In 2010, his music theater work Persephone, a collaboration with Mimi Goese, Warren Leight and Ridge Theater featuring Julia Stiles, was presented at the Brooklyn Academy of Music's Next Wave Festival. The music from the production was released as a CD as Songs for Persephone on Ramseur Records in 2011.

The Demo, an electronic opera co-created with composer Mikel Rouse and based on Douglas Engelbart's 1968 demonstration of early computer technology (called "The Mother of All Demos"), was premiered in 2015 at the Bing Concert Hall at Stanford University.

Neill has performed his music extensively in a wide variety of international settings including the Big Ears Festival 2019, Lincoln Center, Whitney Museum of American Art, Getty Museum, Broad Museum, Moogfest 2011, Cité de la Musique in France, the Berlin Love Parade in Germany, the Festival dei Due Mondi and Umbria Jazz Festival in Italy, the Bang on a Can festival in New York, the Istanbul Jazz Festival in Turkey, the Institute of Contemporary Arts and Edinburgh Festival in the UK, and NIME conferences (in 2005, 2006, 2010 and 2013). The Sci-Fi Lounge, his collaboration with DJ Spooky and Emergency Broadcast Network, toured America and Europe in 1997. His 2002 album Automotive (Six Degrees) was an early example of the convergence of content and commerce; the album is composed entirely of extended versions of music he originally wrote for Volkswagen TV and Internet commercials.

Neill is also active as a sound and installation artist. His collaborative works with Bill Jones have been exhibited in museums and galleries including Exit Art, the American Museum of Natural History and the Sandra Gering Gallery in New York, and the Wellcome Gallery in London. Neill’s installation/performance "Green Machine" was shown at the Paula Cooper Gallery in 1994. In the Shadow of Forward Motion, his major collaborative piece with the late artist David Wojnarowicz, has been exhibited and screened in venues such as the New Museum, Tate Modern in the UK, and PPOW Gallery in New York. It was featured in the PBS documentary Imagining America.

Neill was the Music Curator of the N.Y.C. performance space The Kitchen from 1992 to 1999, a position in which fostered the burgeoning electronic music scene. He began his teaching career in 2007 as a professor of music technology at the New Jersey Institute of Technology (NJIT). He was a Professor of Music Industry and Production as well as the founder and Director of the MFA in Creative Music Technology at Ramapo College, also in New Jersey, until 2024. In 2025 he was made an Emeritus Professor by the Board of Trustees of Ramapo College.

Neill's first book, Diffusing Music: Trajectories of Sonic Democratization, was published by Bloomsbury Academic Press in December 2024.
