= Tirez Tirez =

American rock band

- Origin: Kansas City, Missouri
- Genres: New wave, minimalism
- Years active: 1978–1988
- Labels: Object Music; Aura Records; Les Disques Du Crépuscule; Sire Records; IRS Records
- Past members: Mikel Rouse; Rob Shepperson; Jeff Burk; James Bergman; Philip Johnston; Blaine L. Reininger; Bill Tesar; Rave Tesar; Mark Lampariello
- Website: Mikel Rouse's Website

Tirez Tirez was an American rock band led by composer/performer Mikel Rouse, the band's only constant member. The group was active from 1978 through 1988, and had a new wave/art rock sensibility that was strongly influenced by minimalism.

== History ==
=== Founding and early years (1978-83) ===
Tirez Tirez was founded by Missouri native Mikel Rouse, and gave its first performance as the opening act for the rock band Talking Heads at a 1978 concert in Kansas City, Missouri. The band's initial line-up was Rouse (vocals/guitar), Rob Shepperson (drums) and Jeff Burk (bass).

Tirez Tirez issued two very rare self-released LPs in their earliest days: No Double Bagging Necessary (1978) and Rush & Dissonance (1979). All three members of the group subsequently moved to New York City in 1979, and self-released their debut single ("Scattered"/"Scenery") in November of that year.

The band's third album (1980's Etudes) was recorded in New York City, but it did not initially see a US release, and was at first only picked up for distribution by the tiny British independent label Object Music. The LP went on to sell a very respectable 2,000 copies in the UK, and US indie Aura Records later issued in the album in the US in late 1981. Aura also issued "Razorblades", a single taken from the album.

Bassist Burk left Tirez Tirez in 1982, and was replaced by James Bergman. Philip Johnston (keyboards/woodwinds) was also added to the group at about the same time. This line-up (Rouse/Shepperson/Bergman/Johnston) recorded 1983's Story Of The Year, which was released only in Europe via Belgian label Les Disques Du Crépuscule.

Although he had left Tirez Tirez, original band member Burk would continue to contribute finished artwork to future Tirez Tirez album and single releases after his 1982 departure; the same would be true of original drummer Shepperson after his departure in early 1984.

=== Creation of Broken Consort (1984-85) ===
In 1984, Rouse would begin recording more minimalist work with his instrumental "chamber orchestra" Broken Consort. From this point forward, Tirez Tirez and Broken Consort often featured identical memberships, although each group had a distinctly different repertoire. For the first album credited to "Mikel Rouse Broken Consort" (1984's Jade Tiger) the band line up of Rouse/Shepperson/Bergman/Johnston was exactly the same as that of Tirez Tirez's Story Of The Year.

In 1984, Tirez Tirez released the Europe-only non-LP 12" single "Under The Door" / "Sleep". The only credited musicians on this release were Rouse (guitars/keyboards/synthesizers/percussion/vocals) and, on the A-side only, Blaine L. Reininger (violin/bass programming). In 1985, bassist Bergman re-joined the fold in time for the Broken Consort LP A Walk In The Woods. The same year, the Rouse/Bergman duo (augmented by saxophonist Ellery Eskelin) also recorded the Broken Consort album A Lincoln Portrait, although it was not released until 1988.

=== Major label releases and break-up (1986-93) ===
In 1986, Tirez Tirez (now officially a duo of Rouse and Bergman) issued the non-LP 12" "Set The Timer" / "Uptight" on Sire Records. This was their first US release in five years, and their first release to receive major label distribution.

Shortly after the release of "Set The Timer", the group found a permanent US home with the IRS label. For their fifth album (1987's Social Responsibility), the band was still a duo of Rouse and Bergman, with Rouse performing all instruments except bass.

The band expanded to a quintet for a subsequent tour, and for their final studio release, 1988's Against All Flags, Tirez Tirez's line-up consisted of Rouse (vocals/guitar), Bergman (bass), and new members Bill Tesar (drums), Rave Tesar (keyboards) and Mark Lampariello (guitar).

According to Mikel Rouse's web site, one further Tirez Tirez album was recorded after 1988, but it was never released. Rouse slowly phased out Tirez Tirez over the next few years, while continuing to work with many of the same musicians; in addition to Rouse, the 1993 line-up of his Broken Consort ensemble consisted of Tirez Tirez players James Bergman (bass), Bill Tesar (drums), and Mark Lampariello (guitar), along with non-Tirez member Dale Kleps (woodwinds). Tirez Tirez was still listed as a going concern in the liner notes to the 1993 Broken Consort release Soul Menu, but both groups wound down shortly thereafter.

Rouse continues to live in New York City, and since 1994 has performed and recorded as a solo artist.

== Albums ==
=== Albums credited to Tirez Tirez ===
- No Double Bagging Necessary (1978)
- Rush & Dissonance (1979)
- Etudes (1980)
- Story Of The Year (1983)
- Social Responsibility (1987)
- Against All Flags (1988)

=== Albums credited to Mikel Rouse Broken Consort ===
"Mikel Rouse Broken Consort" featured all the members of Tirez Tirez, playing more experimental, instrumental music.

- Jade Tiger (1984)
- A Walk In The Woods (1985)
- A Lincoln Portrait (1988)
- Soul Menu (1993)

== Singles ==
- "Scattered" / "Scenery" (1979)
- "Razorblades" / "Hair" (1981)
- "Under The Door" / "Sleep" (1984)
- "Set The Timer" / "Uptight" (1986)

== See also ==
- Mikel Rouse
