= Heart of Darkness (1990 film) =

- El corazón en las tinieblas
- Directed by: Román Chalbaud
- Starring: Jacques Spiesser; María Cristina Lozada; Alejo Felipe; Manuelita Selwer
- Release date: 1990
- Country: Venezuela
- Language: Spanish

El corazón en las tinieblas (English: Heart of Darkness) is a 1990 film directed by Venezuelan Román Chalbaud based on Pierre Kast's project Le Radjah de la Mer, inspired by Joseph Conrad's novella of the same name.

Like the novel, the film is about Joseph Conrad's journey to the Congo as a settler between 1890 and 1914. The film shows the difficulties of the Europeans to survive the climate and the diseases of the Congolese jungle, as well as the abuses of the natives by the settlers.

== Cast ==
- Jacques Spiesser
- María Cristina Lozada
- Alejo Felipe
- Manuelita Selwer

== Plot ==
Joseph is a sailor who returns to his aunt's home after fourteen years at sea, where he gets involved in the process of African colonization by signing a contract to travel to the Congo captaining the Florida.

The Florida is shipwrecked as soon as it arrives in the Congo, forcing them to walk through the Congolese jungle in the heart of darkness. The Congo is a hostile place for most Europeans who succumb to diseases such as malaria. After falling ill with gout Joseph decides to return to England, his stay in the Congo has left him lame and visibly worn out.

In England he dedicates himself to writing, his first novel in which he narrates his experiences in the Congo is well received by the public. Until 1914 he devoted himself to his home and writing, when he enlisted in the army as a sailor, which led him back to sea, destined for a mission that would be his last as a man of the sea.

== Bibliography ==
- Cinemateca Nacional de Venezuela. 2006. Cuadernos Cineastas Venezolanos, Román Chalbaud. Caracas, Venezuela, Fundación Cinemateca Nacional. 100 páginas. ISBN 980-6506-03-0
