= John de Martelly =

American painter

- Born: 1903; Philadelphia, Pennsylvania, United States
- Died: 1979 (aged 75–76); Okemos, Michigan, United States
- Occupations: Lithographer, etcher, painter, illustrator, educator, and writer

John Stockton de Martelly (1903–1979) was a twentieth-century American lithographer, etcher, painter, illustrator, teacher and writer.

== Early life ==
John de Martelly was born in Philadelphia, Pennsylvania in 1903 in Philadelphia and studied at the Pennsylvania Academy of Fine Arts, in Florence, Italy, as well as the Royal College of Art in London. In the 1930s and 1940s, he taught printmaking at the Kansas City Art Institute to the same students who studied painting with Thomas Hart Benton.

== Works ==
De Martelly became a close friend of Benton, and was influenced by his Regionalist style. When Benton was fired from the Art Institute, the Board of Governors offered de Martelly Benton's job as head of the Painting Department. De Martelly was furious and quit. De Martelly's lithographs, sold through the Associated American Artists Galleries in New York in the 1930s and 1940s, captured the essence of the rural American landscape.

In 1943, de Martelly began teaching at Michigan State University in East Lansing, where he was named artist-in-residence in 1946. By the late 1940s, de Martelly abandoned Regionalism for Abstract Expressionism and closely studied Daumier.

== Death ==
He died at the age of sevventy-six in Okemos, Michigan in 1979.

== Collections ==
- Detroit Institute of Arts
- Fine Arts Museums of San Francisco
- Kalamazoo Institute of Arts, Michigan
- Kresge Art Museum, East Lansing, Michigan
- Nelson-Atkins Museum of Art, Kansas City, Kansas
- Smithsonian American Art Museum
