= Robert Isaacson =

Collector, scholar, and art dealer

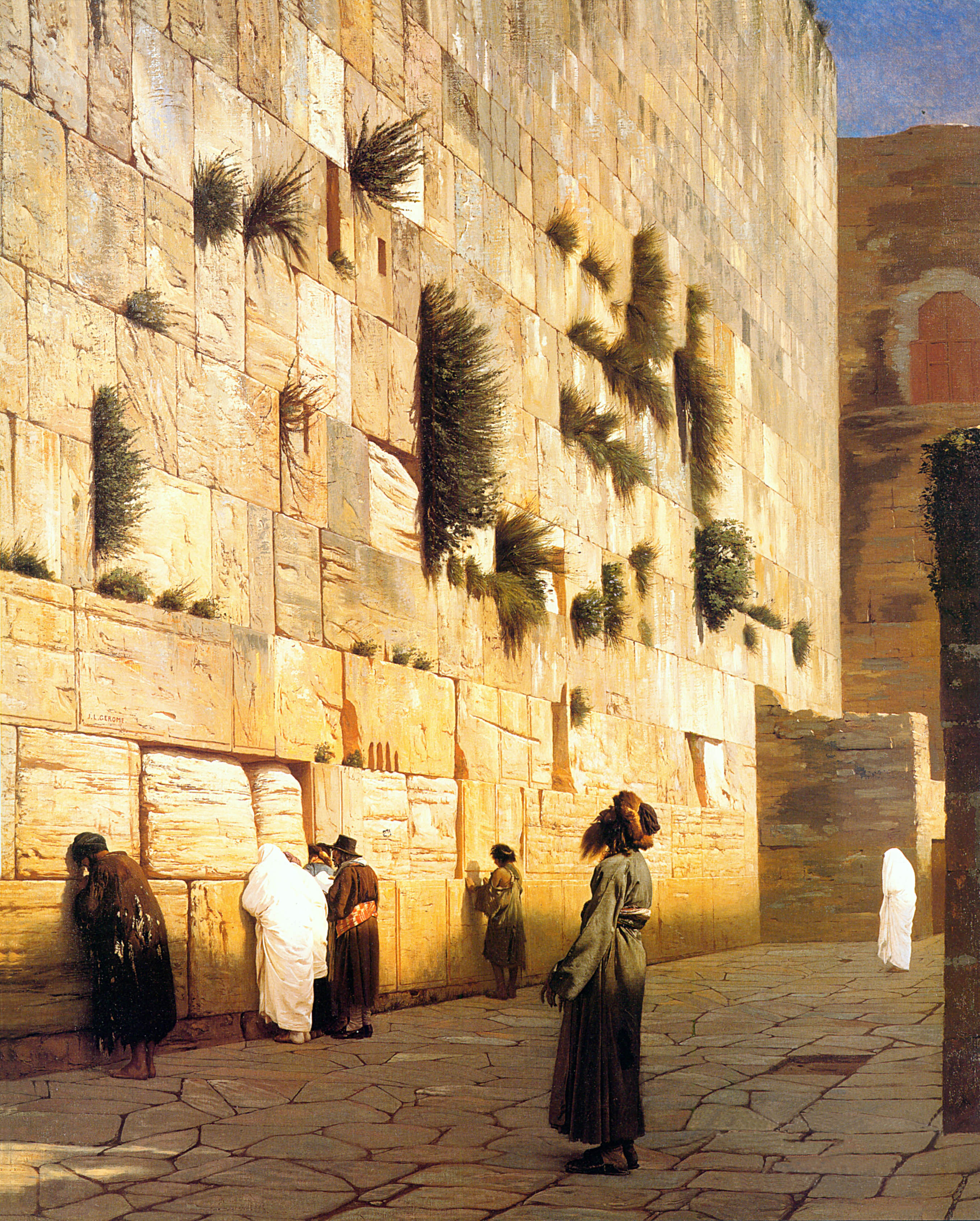
Robert Isaacson owned Jean-Léon Gérôme's "Solomon's Wall, Jerusalem (The Wailing Wall)" for two decades; the circa 1875 canvas was sold at Christie's in May 1999 for $2,312,500, establishing what was then a record price for the artist.

Robert Isaacson (1 September 1927, St. Louis, Missouri – 5 November 1998, New York City) was a collector, scholar, and art dealer eulogized upon his death as "the Berenson of nineteenth century academic studies."

== Early life ==
An only child, Isaacson's personal fortune derived from his maternal grandmother, whose family found success in the fur trade; Isaacson spent early summers surrounded by aunts, uncles, and family retainers in his grandmother's ornate mansion in Leavenworth, Kansas. Despite an apparent reading disability, Isaacson was musically gifted; he was permitted to move alone at age sixteen from Saint Louis to New York City to study the harpsichord, although his only subsequent education in any organized sense was a summer at Black Mountain College.

Isaacson spent several years in post-war Rome, Florence and Venice exploring churches and museums, developing a formidable and deeply intuitive understanding of painting, drawing, and the evolution of artistic temperament. In Rome in the early 1950s, Isaacson dated the poet James Merrill, who wrote candidly about their relationship in his 1993 memoir, A Different Person. The couple visited Istanbul together—the visit proved a formative experience in Merrill's career—and the two men remained close friends until the poet's death in 1995.

== Career ==
Upon Isaacson's return to New York, he became an art dealer almost by accident, taking on Edwin Hewitt's gallery at the request of mutual friend Lincoln Kirstein. Although the Robert Isaacson Gallery, located at 22 East 66th Street, represented the estate of Elie Nadelman and championed Magic Realist painters (including his favorite, George Tooker), Isaacson's growing interest and fascination with nineteenth century academic painting, an extremely unfashionable pursuit in the 1950s, would in time make him the paradigm of the scholarly dealer: his opinions and near-encyclopedic knowledge of the once-obscure field were sought long after the Robert Isaacson Gallery shut its doors (around 1970) and Isaacson began devoting himself full-time to curating and collecting. Isaacson played an important role in helping rehabilitate the reputations of Lawrence Alma-Tadema, Charles Bargue, William-Adolphe Bouguereau, Thomas Dewing, Jean-Léon Gérôme, Albert Joseph Moore, Mihály Munkácsy and Gaston La Touche, among others.

In keeping with Isaacson's will, thirteen important paintings from his collection (including five Gérômes) were auctioned by Christie's on 6 May 1999 to benefit a charitable foundation. Records for the Robert Isaacson Gallery (1952–67), Hewitt Gallery, Durlacher Bros. and related business and exhibition papers are on deposit with the Smithsonian Institution.
