= John Douglas Patrick =

American painter

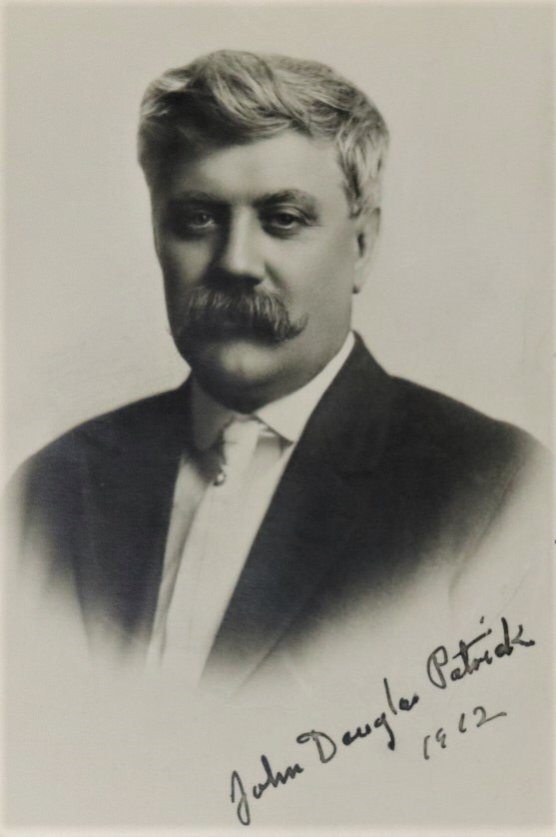
Portrait photograph of John Douglas Patrick, taken in 1912

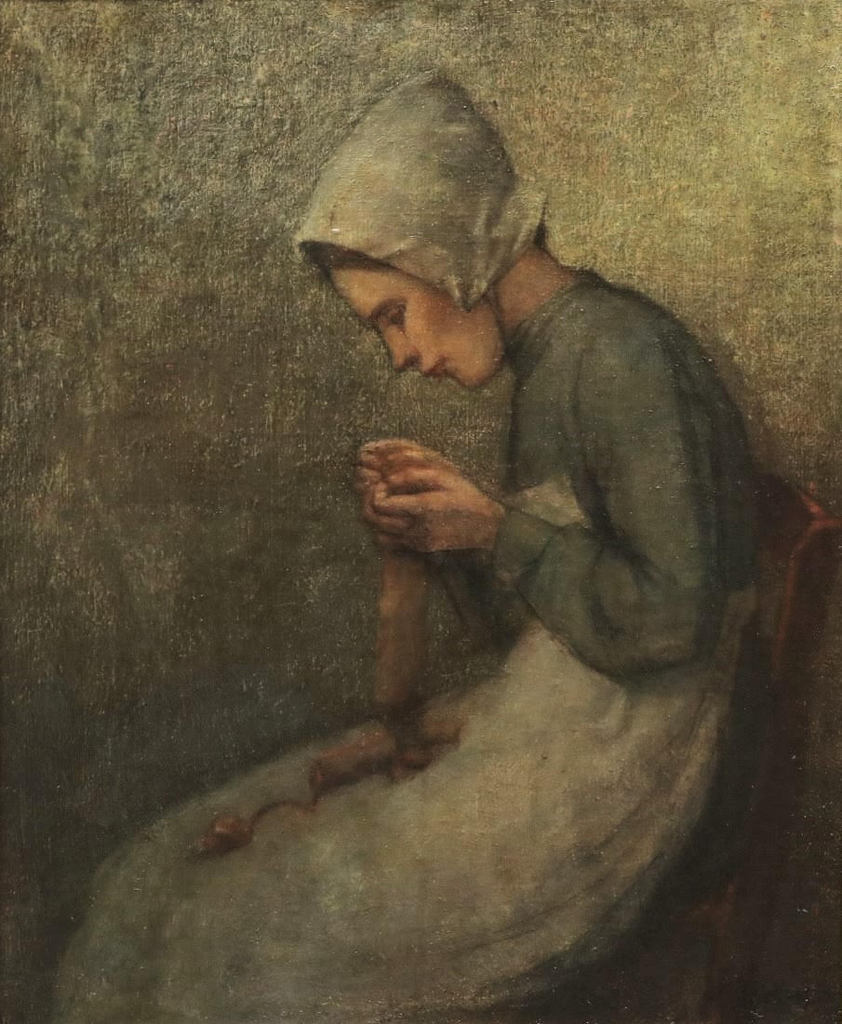
Peasant Knitting, oil on canvas

John Douglas Patrick (August 17, 1863 – January 19, 1937) was an American painter.

Born in Hopewell, Bedford County, Pennsylvania, Patrick was the son of Scottish immigrants, and moved with his family to a farm outside of Lenexa, Kansas in 1878. He began his artistic studies at the St. Louis School of Fine Arts before leaving in 1885; he traveled to Paris, where he enrolled in the Académie Julian. During this time he was accepted at the Paris Salon, showing work there in 1886 and again in 1887. In 1888 he painted Brutality, depicting a workman beating his horse, a common sight in Parisian streets at the time; the painting was shown at the Salon of 1888, and is widely considered his masterpiece. It is currently owned by the Nelson-Atkins Museum of Art. Patrick also exhibited at the Exposition Universelle in 1889, where Brutality won a medal, making Patrick among the first Americans so awarded by the French artistic community; some sources denote him as the first American from west of the Mississippi River to be so honored.

He returned home to the United States, teaching at the St. Louis School of Fine Arts for three years. In 1903 he moved to Kansas City, Missouri, where he took a position at the Kansas City Art Institute. He would remain with that institution for 32 years, rising to become the primary instructor of painting and occupying a prominent role in the local artistic community early in the 20th century. He showed work at the Louisiana Purchase Exposition in 1904. In addition to teaching, he was active as a portraitist for much of his career. Patrick died in Kansas City, and is buried in the Corinth Cemetery in Prairie Village, Kansas, in the family plot.

In addition to Brutality, the Nelson-Atkins Museum of Art owns several drawings by Patrick; all were donated to the collection by the families of his daughters, Grayce Patrick Wray and Hazel Patrick Rickenbacher, to recognize the museum's 75th anniversary in 2009. The Mildred Lane Kemper Art Museum owns a portrait of Wayman Crow, Sr., painted in 1890. Another work is in the Johnson County Historical Museum in Johnson County, Kansas while the Kansas City Art Institute owns a self-portrait. Other paintings remain in private hands.
