= Lee Jackson (author) =

British author and historian

- Born: 13 May 1971 (age 54)
- Occupations: Historian, novelist
- Website: http://www.victorianlondon.org

Lee Jackson (born 1971) is a British novelist and historian.

== Education and career ==
Jackson has a doctorate from Royal Holloway University of London and is a member of the Academic Advisory Board of the Dickens Museum. He is the creator of The Dictionary of Victorian London, a widely used free educational resource, established in 2001, that brings together digitised primary sources relating to the social history of Victorian London.

== Writing ==
Jackson has written novels, anthologies and non-fiction books, all of which focus upon the Victorian capital. In 2015, he was interviewed on NPR about his book Dirty Old London (Yale University Press, 2014), a history of dirt, filth and pollution, described by The Guardian as "rich in wonderful contemporary details gleaned from newspapers and archives ... a vivid account of the enormous challenges faced by a city expanding at an unprecedented rate". Jackson was also interviewed in print for Der Spiegel He has written articles for History Today. In 2021, he lectured and recorded video content for the Thames Festival Trust about North Woolwich Pleasure Gardens, as featured in his book Palaces of Pleasure (Yale University Press, 2019).

== Bibliography ==
=== Fiction ===
- Jackson, Lee (2003). London Dust. London: Arrow Books. ISBN 9780099439998.
- Jackson, Lee (2004). A Metropolitan Murder. London: Arrow Books. ISBN 9780434012299.
- Jackson, Lee (2005). The Welfare of the Dead. London: Arrow Books. ISBN 9780099469230.
- Jackson, Lee (2006). The Last Pleasure Garden. London: Arrow Books. ISBN 9780099469247.
- Jackson, Lee (2007). A Most Dangerous Woman. London: Arrow Books. ISBN 9780434015528.
- Jackson, Lee (2008). The Mesmerist's Apprentice. London: Arrow Books. ISBN 9780099498421.
- Jackson, Lee (2011). The Diary of a Murder. London: Snowbooks. ISBN 9781906727932.

=== Non-fiction ===
- Jackson, Lee (2006). A Dictionary of Victorian London: An A-Z of the Great Metropolis. London: Anthem Press. ISBN 9781843312307.
- Jackson, Lee (2012). Walking Dickens' London. London: Shire. ISBN 9780747811343.
- Jackson, Lee (2014). Dirty Old London: The Victorian Fight Against Filth. London: Yale University Press. ISBN 9780300216110.
- Jackson, Lee (2019). Palaces of Pleasure: From Music Halls to the Seaside to Football, How the Victorians Invented Mass Entertainment. London: Yale University Press. ISBN 9780300254785.
- Jackson, Lee (2023). Dickensland: The Curious History of Dickens's London. London: Yale University Press. ISBN 9780300266207.
