= Karen Glaser (photographer) =

American artist (1954–2026)

- Born: June 12, 1954
- Died: February 18, 2026 (aged 71); Florida, U.S.
- Education: Kansas City Art Institute, Indiana University in Bloomington
- Known for: Underwater photography

Karen Glaser (June 12, 1954 – February 18, 2026) was an American artist known for her underwater photography. The daughter of noted educational psychologist Robert Glaser, she shifted her personal focus to Florida's springs and wetlands.

== Life and career ==
Glaser started her career as a printer. Glaser became a photographer when she began using an underwater Instamatic camera. Glaser learned to scuba dive, and with her underwater camera, she began photographing the springs of North and Central Florida with available light alone.

She captured photographs of manatees and other wildlife before shifting focus to the underwater landscapes. She saw the underwater scenes as not only habitats for wildlife, but also as landscapes able to stand on their own as meaningful artworks. Glaser later continued her photography at the Big Cypress National Preserve and Everglades National Park. In 2014, her work was part of an exhibition on display at the Harn Museum of Art in Gainesville, Florida titled "The Mark of Water: Florida's Springs and Swamps by Karen Glaser." Speaking of her work, Glaser stated "I didn't learn how to photograph under water. If I did, I would have used a flash. I would have tried to avoid the matter in the water. But for me, that stuff is the lifeblood of the image. I was trained in a fine art program. I just picked up my camera and started photographing like I do above water." Her work is inspired by the wondrous ecological diversity that Florida has to offer.

Glaser died on February 18, 2026, at the age of 71.
