= Hearts of Darkness (band) =

American Afrobeat band

- Origin: Kansas City, Missouri, United States
- Genres: Afrobeat, funk, hip hop, big band
- Years active: 2007–present
- Members: Les Izmore; Rachel Christia; Brad Williams; Miko Spears; Dominique Sanders; Lucas Parker; Sam Goodell
- Website: www.reverbnation.com/heartsofdarkness

Hearts of Darkness is a Community whose original material absorbs influences from 1970s afrobeat to hip hop, 1960s and 1970s soul and funk, as well as reaching back to 1920s big band . The sound evokes memories of Count Basie, James Brown, and Fela Kuti Jamming with Nina Simone, Erykah Badu and Sun Ra.

== Personnel ==
- Les Izmore: Vocals, Shekere
- Erica Townsend: Vocals
- Rachel Christia: Vocals
- Leena Will: Vocals
- Erin Bopp: Vocals
- Philip "So Smooth" Keegan: Shekere
- Brad "Bad Brad" Williams: Kit, Percussion
- Miko Spears: Congas
- Dominique Sanders: Bass Guitar
- Lucas Parker: Rhythm Guitar
- Sam Goodell: Keys
- Chalis O'neal: Trumpet
- Ernest Melton: Saxophones
- Jolan Smith: Tenor Sax - Vocals

== Discography ==
=== Albums ===
- Hearts of Darkness (2010)
- Shelf Life (2012)

=== EPs ===
- Numeration (2012)
