= Associated American Artists =

American art gallery

Coordinates: 40.763372°N 73.975343°W

Associated American Artists (AAA) was an art gallery in New York City that was established in 1934 and ceased operation in 2000. The gallery marketed art to the middle and upper-middle classes, first in the form of affordable prints and later in home furnishings and accessories, and played a significant role in the growth of art as an industry.

== Beginnings ==
Associated American Artists was begun by Reeves Lewenthal. Lewenthal's first job was as a reporter for the Chicago Tribune but he quickly expanded into artists' agent, working as a publicist for British artist Douglas Chandor. By the 1930s Lewenthal had a clientele of 35 groups including the National Academy of Design and the Beaux-Arts Institute of Design. Realizing the limited possibilities in selling high-priced art to high-class dealers, and the correspondingly huge potential in marketing affordable art to the much larger middle classes, he left his public relations work to try his hand at this new business model.

Prints being relatively cheap to produce, Lewenthal decided to focus on that medium. Before the 1930s, fine-art prints were usually limited editions which sold for $10–$50. During the Great Depression the Federal Art Project had resulted in hundreds of thousands of prints, but these were distributed free (mostly to schools) thus the artists made no profits from print sales. Lewenthal's idea was to combine quality, affordability, and profit. In 1934 he met with several well-known American artists, including Thomas Hart Benton, and proposed hiring them to produce lithographs which he would then sell to middle-class buyers for $5 apiece plus $2 per frame, paying the artist $200 per edition. At the same time, corporations began hiring famous artists to work on advertising campaigns – Dole Pineapple, for example, hired artist Georgia O'Keeffe to "create pictorial links between pineapple juice and tropical romance". This convergence of art, business, and consumerism was the perfect environment for Lewenthal's new Associated American Artists enterprise.

When Lewenthal commissioned his first lithographs in 1934, the American economy was still limping towards recovery from the Depression; high-priced art was an impossible luxury for most people and the old galleries that had always supported artists were finding it difficult to broker their work. AAA was thus "an agent of economic salvation" for numerous American artists including Peggy Bacon, Aaron Bohrod, John Steuart Curry, Luigi Lucioni, and Grant Wood, despite the fact that signing with AAA usually meant being fired from their higher-end gallery.

I knew the regionalists were popular because their names were in the art magazines all the time. But they weren't popular enough, and they weren't making any money. Why, when I first went to Tom Benton's New York apartment he was living in utter squalor. I more or less rescued him.

By the fall of 1934 Lewenthal had contracts with fifty department stores to carry his "signed originals by America's great artists."

== Populist appeal ==
Lewenthal marketed his prints as educational resources, as a patriotic choice, and as "art for the people" rather than "art for the wealthy." In January 1935 AAA issued its first mail-order print catalogue; mail-order print sales will continue for the next forty-nine years. He also placed advertisements in magazines such as Time and Reader's Digest, and by promoting print collecting in terms of upward mobility—in the same way as buying Listerine ("The Dentifrice of the Rich," according to one ad campaign), owning modern art raised one's life socially. AAA's success led them to open a 30,000-square-foot gallery at 711 Fifth Avenue in 1939 where they featured paintings and sculpture. In 1944, AAA had 107 artists under contract and sold 62,374 lithographs, for a net income of $1 million per month.

In addition to its mainstream marketing strategy, AAA chose art and artists with populist appeal. Representational and regional art made up the bulk of their lines; particularly popular were the works of Benton, Curry and Wood. These artists avoided gritty realism and created positive images of an idealized, strong, capable America, a viewpoint which accorded well with the political environment of the New Deal and was in some senses therapeutic for the anxiety and weakness pervasive during and just after the Depression. Typical of this was Benton's Plowing It Under, released shortly after the federal government arranged the plowing under of millions of acres previously devoted to cotton production in order to increase farm revenue; Benton's work reassured the public that the government was working in the best interests of the people.

== Commercialization of art ==
The Regionalists by and large were in favor of businesses and advertising using their works, believing that fine art could raise the consciousness of business. They did not fully realize how art figured into corporate branding and advertising in the minds of corporate planners, or consider that their art might be used to inspire confidence in a product. They were soon to learn. Benton's original works for R.J. Reynolds' Lucky Strikes, for example, showed black sharecroppers at work, but corporate headquarters were not interested in "Negroes doing what looked like old-time slave work." They demanded pictures that showed not realism but idealism, leading Benton to complain that "Every time a patron dictates to an artist what is to be done, he doesn't get any art, he just gets a poor commercial job." Increasingly, rather than deal with AAA and its artists, companies built in-house art departments that could produce art in the Regionalist style. This appropriation of the regionalist/representational style culminated in the propaganda posters of World War II.

== Post-WWII ==
The increasing association of regionalist and representational art with commercialism and advertising (and in some eyes, with fascism) contributed to its decreasing popularity and to the rise of abstract and surrealist art after World War II. When AAA opened galleries in Chicago and Beverly Hills, it stocked them with modern works by American and—a first for AAA—European artists. (When Lewenthal offered Jackson Pollock an art-for-business commission like those he had offered his artists in 1934, Pollock turned him down.) In its press releases and articles, AAA talked about exploring "new frontiers," "new trends"—and made no mention of the $5 mail-order line and the artists who had helped it succeed twenty years earlier. Thomas Hart Benton resigned from AAA in 1946.

AAA continued to find new ways to sell art, however, branching out into Stonelain porcelain, fabric, and housewares such as ashtrays, playing cards, and lamp shades as vehicles for work in abstract and other modern styles. By the mid-1950s, Lewenthal was quoted as saying, "Today's artist is a designer, not an Ivory Tower tenant. His is a field of practical creativity and every American room can become a showcase for his genius.". Now, rather than bringing modern art to the masses, AAA was bringing mass consumer commodities into the world of art.

AAA was a victim of its own success in some ways. Having been so successful, it was adopted as a model by other companies that began to compete with AAA—marketing fabric, for example, as "etching by the yard" or commissioning artists to do designs for lines of china or wallpaper. Steubenville China marketed its "American Modern" line of place settings as "art translated into dinnerware." In 1958 Lewenthal took over management of Rust Craft Greeting Cards, handling all AAA's decorative arts lines, while Sylvan Cole took responsibility for the New York gallery and the fine art market.

In a strange reversal of its "market to the masses" philosophy, many early AAA prints which sold originally for $5 go to art collectors for thousands of dollars today.

== See also ==
- Commercial art
