= 1972 in art =

Events from the year 1972 in art.

== Events ==
- March–November – City Sculpture Project in England.
- May 17 - 1972 Worcester Art Museum robbery
- May 21 – In St. Peter's Basilica (Vatican City), Laszlo Toth attacks Michelangelo's Pietà statue with a geologist's hammer, shouting that he is Jesus Christ.
- June 8 – KUNSTEN Museum of Modern Art Aalborg, Denmark, designed by Alvar and Elissa Aalto and Jean-Jacques Baruël, is completed.
- September 4 – 1972 Montreal Museum of Fine Arts robbery.
- September 15 – Release in France of Luis Buñuel's surrealist film The Discreet Charm of the Bourgeoisie.
- September 16 – Opening of A.I.R. Gallery at 97 Wooster Street, SoHo, New York, the first artist-run, not-for-profit gallery for women artists in the United States.
- September – Release in the United Kingdom of Ken Russell's biographical film about Gaudier-Brzeska, Savage Messiah.
- October 4 – Kimbell Art Museum in Fort Worth, Texas, designed by Louis Kahn, is opened.
- date unknown
  - BBC Television broadcasts Ways of Seeing, a four-part series by John Berger on art.
  - The Bridgeman Art Library is established as a commercial virtual archive of images by Harriet Bridgeman in London.
  - Costantino Nivola becomes the first non-American member of the American Academy of Arts and Letters.
  - Friedensreich Hundertwasser publishes his architectural manifesto, Your window right – your tree duty.
  - Portmeirion Pottery brings out its best-selling "Botanic Garden" design.
  - Oliver Millar becomes the first full-time Surveyor of the Queen's Pictures in the United Kingdom, succeeding Anthony Blunt.

== Awards ==
- Archibald Prize: Clifton Pugh – The Hon E G Whitlam
- John Moores Painting Prize - Euan Uglow

== Works ==
- Francis Bacon – Triptych–August 1972
- Enrico Baj - The Funeral of the Anarchist Pinelli

- Thomas Hart Benton – Joplin at the Turn of the Century
- Christo and Jeanne Claude – Valley Curtain (along Colorado State Highway 325)
- Bronisław Chromy – Wawel Dragon (statue, Kraków)
- Marcelle Ferron – Untitled stained glass panel at Montreal Museum of Fine Arts
- Helen Frankenthaler – Coral Wedge
- Barbara Hepworth – Minoan Head and Assembly of Sea Forms
- David Hockney – Portrait of an Artist (Pool with Two Figures)
- Elek Imredy – Girl in a Wetsuit (bronze, Vancouver, British Columbia)
- Joan Jonas – Vertical Roll
- Alexander Liberman – Contact II (sculpture, Portland, Oregon)
- Natalia LL – Consumer Art (video series, begins)
- Paul McCarthy – Black and White Tapes
- Clifton Pugh – Death of a Wombat
- John Raimondi – David
- Betye Saar - The Liberation of Aunt Jemina
- Liberty Bell (Portland, Oregon)
- Mansu Hill Grand Monument (Pyongyang, North Korea)

== Music ==
- Don McLean - Vincent - a tribute to Vincent van Gogh

== Births ==
- January 29 – Brian Wood, American author and illustrator.
- April 6 – Rinko Kawauchi, Japanese photographer.
- April 29 – Roman Dirge, American comic book artist and magician.
- July 2 – Coster Balakasi, Zimbabwean sculptor.
- July 19 – Zanele Muholi, South African visual activist.
- date unknown
  - Andrea Büttner, German contemporary artist.
  - Duncan Campbell, Irish-born video artist.
  - Jules de Balincourt, French painter.
  - Gilles Tréhin, French artist and author.
  - Hema Upadhyay, née Hirani, Indian installation artist and photographer (d. 2015).

== Deaths ==
=== January to June ===
- January 19 – Suzanne Malherbe, French illustrator and designer (b. 1892).
- February 19 – Tedd Pierce, American animated cartoon writer, animator and artist (b. 1906).
- March 13 – Tony Ray-Jones, English photographer (b. 1941).
- March 23 – Cristóbal Balenciaga, Spanish fashion designer (b. 1895).
- March 27
  - M. C. Escher, Dutch graphic artist (b. 1898).
  - Ricco Wassmer, Swiss painter (b. 1915).
- April 26 - Fernando Amorsolo, Filipino painter (b. 1892)

=== July to December ===
- July 31 – Dod Procter, English painter (b. 1890)
- October 23 – Clarice Cliff, English ceramic artist (b. 1899)
- October 31 – Beta Vukanović, Serbian painter (b. 1872).
- December 23 – Norman Clyde, American mountaineer, nature photographer and naturalist (b. 1885).
- December 24 – Gisela Richter, English archaeologist and art historian (b. 1882).
- December 29 – Joseph Cornell, American artist and sculptor (b. 1903).

=== Full date unknown ===
- Gerard Curtis Delano, American painter (b. 1890).
- Ilija Bašičević, Serbian painter (b. 1895)

== See also ==
- 1972 in Fine Arts of the Soviet Union
