= Apodaca (surname) =

Apodaca is a surname. Notable people with the surname include:

- Travis Apodaca (born 1988), American Singer/Songwriter
- Aidan Apodaca (born 1996), American soccer player
- Anthony Apodaca, Director of Graphics Research and Development at Pixar
- Antonia Apodaca (1923–2020), American musician
- Bob Apodaca (born 1950), American professional baseball player
- Clara Apodaca (born 1934), American patron of the arts, nonprofit executive, and politician
- Felicitas Apodaca (1912–1997), American community activist
- Jerry Apodaca (1934–2023), 24th governor of New Mexico
- Juan Ruiz de Apodaca, 1st Count of Venadito (1754–1835), Spanish naval officer
- Paul Apodaca, associate professor of Anthropology and American Studies at Chapman University
- Rick Apodaca (born 1980), Puerto Rican former professional basketball player
- Tom Apodaca (born 1957), American politician
- Nathan Apodaca (born 1983), American viral video creator

== See also ==
- Apodaca, a city in Mexico
- Apodaka, a village in Spain
