= Aaron Gunn Pyle =

American painter

Aaron G. Pyle
- Born: February 19, 1909; Towanda, Kansas
- Died: December 25, 1972 (aged 63); Chappell, Nebraska
- Known for: Painting
- Movement: Regionalism
- Spouse: Jerra Vanetten Berry, (m. 1954)

Aaron Gunn Pyle (February 19, 1909 – December 25, 1972) was an American painter known for his contributions to Regionalist painting. His work is closely tied to the Midwestern United States, the region where he was born and spent most of his life.

== Biography ==
Born in Towanda, Kansas, Aaron Gunn Pyle was raised in Chappell, Nebraska, where he cultivated a connection to rural life that shaped his artistic style. He graduated from Chappell High School in 1926, and while a senior took a correspondence school course in cartooning. He later attended the University of Washington for two years and briefly studied at the Cornish Art School in Seattle. He later pursued his artistic education at the Colorado Springs Fine Art Center and, from 1938 to 1941, studied under American Regionalist Thomas Hart Benton at the Kansas City Art Institute.

Pyle spent most of his time working on his family's farm just west of Chappell, pursuing painting after his chores were complete. He managed his family's 128 acres of farmland while depicting rural Nebraska in paintings of its residents, animals, and landscapes in the mid-20th century. He also regularly contributed pictures to the Omaha World-Herald's Magazine of the Midlands.

== Career ==
Thomas Hart Benton, who was known for his contributions to the Regionalist movement in art, influenced Pyle. Pyle adopted Benton's methodical approach to painting, which involved extensive preliminary work including sketches, drawings, and grisaille studies. Pyle's early works, such as The Blacksmith and Picking Corn, were often executed in grisaille, a monochrome technique. However, he also explored color in smaller paintings. Pyle's preferred medium for completed works was egg tempera, valued for its quick-drying properties and suitability for glazing techniques.

His artistic style tended towards simplification of forms and rhythmic compositions that resembled Benton's, which is perhaps why Benton named him, rather than Pyle's rival Dale Nichols, as the painter of Nebraska. Pyle's works became increasingly colorful, characterized by a focus on primary colors with reduced saturation and intensity. Some exceptions to his usual color scheme were made for commissioned works, such as those for the Omaha World-Herald, which required adjustments for color reproduction.

Pyle's background as a working farmer influenced his approach to rural life and artistic philosophy, aligning with Benton's emphasis on portraying American life, particularly agrarian scenes.

== Legacy ==
Aaron Pyle is part of a distinguished tradition of farmer/artists in Nebraska. Benton spoke highly of his former student, noting, "He, (Pyle), was a true regionalist, perhaps closer to being a real one than any of the rest of us, for he lived continually with his subjects. If I am considered the painter of Missouri, and Grant Wood of Iowa, and John Stuart Curry is of Kansas, then as things now stand, Aaron Pyle is definitely the painter of Nebraska." This identity is evident in works like Wagon Near Chimney Rock, 1968.

Pyle's work has been exhibited in New York City, at the Associated American Artists Gallery, the Denver Art Museum, the Nelson Gallery, Kansas City, and the Joslyn Art Museum, Omaha.

== Works ==
- Picking Corn – tempera – 1942
- Blacksmith – tempera – 1943
- Wagon Near Chimney Rock – tempera on masonite −1968 -14 × 22″
- Wheat Harvest - tempera on board – 1968 – 14 × 21"
- Sledding - tempera on board – 1969 – 15½ × 20″
- Indian Encampment - tempera on masonite – n.d. 25 × 36"
