= Virginia Eifert =

American writer and naturalist

Virginia Louise Snider Eifert
- Born: January 23, 1911; Springfield, Illinois
- Died: June 16, 1966 (aged 55); Springfield, Illinois
- Occupation: Writer/Historian/Artist
- Website: virginiaeifert.com

Virginia Louise Snyder Eifert (January 23, 1911 - June 16, 1966) was a naturalist, nature writer and popular historian based in the U.S. state of Illinois during the early 20th century. Throughout the course of her career Eifert published 18 books, 8 booklets, and numerous scholarly articles from a staff base in the Illinois State Museum. Commentary on Eifert's person and writing paint a picture of her best described as an energetic and enigmatic lover of the wild who wrote in vivid prose and was impassioned with a love for the wild early on in her life that lasted throughout her entire career. Her works included several holistic natural histories of the Mississippi River and a biography of early river chronicler Louis Jolliet, among many others including a multi-volume biography of Abraham Lincoln written for children. Published in the 1950s, the first volume of Three Rivers South : The Story of Young Abe Lincoln was illustrated by Thomas Hart Benton. As a writer for periodicals, Eifert was published in Audubon Magazine, Nature, and Natural History. Her papers were donated to Western Illinois University.

== Early life ==
Eifert was born on January 23, 1911 to Ernest and Felicie Snyder in Springfield, Illinois. Raised near Washington State Park, she spent much of her time outdoors as a small child and grew a love for nature in her own backyard. In her high school years Eifert was prolific in her love for writing and art, however she did not graduate high school due to an illness believed to be rheumatic fever (later though to be a contributing factor to her early death). It is believed that during this time Eifert began her prolific writing career, spending her time in bedrest reading countless works and honing her writing skills before beginning her professional writing career in the mid-1930s for the Illinois State Journal of Springfield after being introduced to the journal's editor, soon after beginning her own journal titled The Nature News.

== Literary career ==
Eifert produced 18 books, several booklets and hundreds of articles and essays primarily focused on the naturalism and wildlife of Illinois as well as natural history and biography of prominent figures within such the state itself. She served as an editor on many articles within the discipline and began a publication associated with the Illinois State Museum titled The Living Museum in 1939, serving as an editor until 1966. A few of Eifert's most popular works include River World: Wildlife of the Mississippi (1959), Men, Birds, and Adventure: The Thrilling Story of the Discovery of American Birds (1962), and Essays on Nature: An Anthology of Selected Writings from the Living Museum which was published in 1967 by the Illinois State Museum and edited by Virginia's own husband after hear death. Eifert's artistic abilities worked in tandem with her passion of nature writing as she was known for her nature photography and ink drawings. Illustrated works done by Eifert feature in her first published novel Birds in Your Backyard (1941), among other works and articles written by the author.

== Late life and legacy ==
Eifert continued to edit articles and oversee publication in The Living Museum until her death at age 55 in 1966 due to a defective heart valve. Her writings were honored, edited and published by her husband and the museum in Essays on Nature after her death and the book is considered to contain some of her greatest written essays. Virginia's son Larry Eifert memorializes her work as a naturalist and author having a large influence on his own life long after her death, and cites her as an inspiration for his work as an artist and naturalist.
