= Apodaca Provincial Park =

Provincial park in British Columbia, Canada

- IUCN category II (national park)
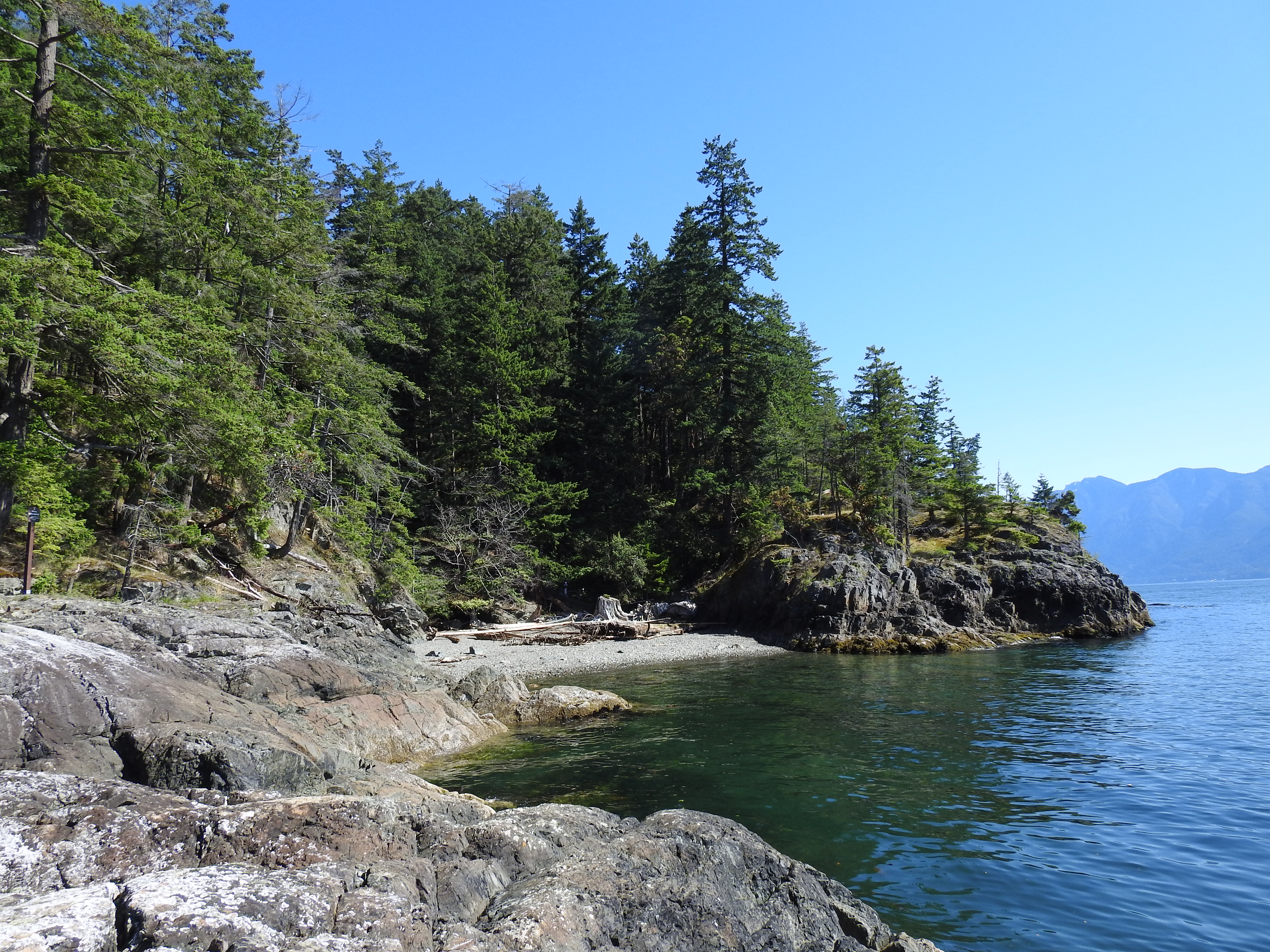

- Location within British Columbia Location within Greater Vancouver Regional District
- Interactive map of Apodaca Provincial Park
- Location: Bowen Island, British Columbia, Canada
- Coordinates: 49.3545°N 123.3398°W
- Area: 8 hectares (20 acres)
- Established: 1954
- Governing body: BC Parks
- Website: Apodaca Provincial Park

Apodaca Provincial Park is a provincial park located on the central eastern shoreline of Bowen Island, British Columbia, Canada.

== History ==
The park was established 1954, one year after the property was donated to the province by Major J. S. Matthews, a noted Vancouver historian and City Archivist for Vancouver.

The park's name comes from Apodaca Cove, which was named to preserve the name for Bowen Island conferred by José María Narváez during his exploration and survey work in the region in 1791, Isla de Apodaca. Apodaca is a city in the state of Nuevo León, Mexico, which was named for Dr. Salvador Apodaca, Bishop of the city of Linares, who was born in Guadalajara in 1769.

== Conservation ==
The parks aims to protect a variety of marine life, such as marbled murrelet, harbour seal, killer whale, Pacific octopus, rockfish, and ochre starfish. The park also offers habitat for coast blacktail deer and a variety of birds. Plantlife includes Douglas fir, lodgepole pine, salal, and Pacific madrone.
