= 1972 Worcester Art Museum robbery =

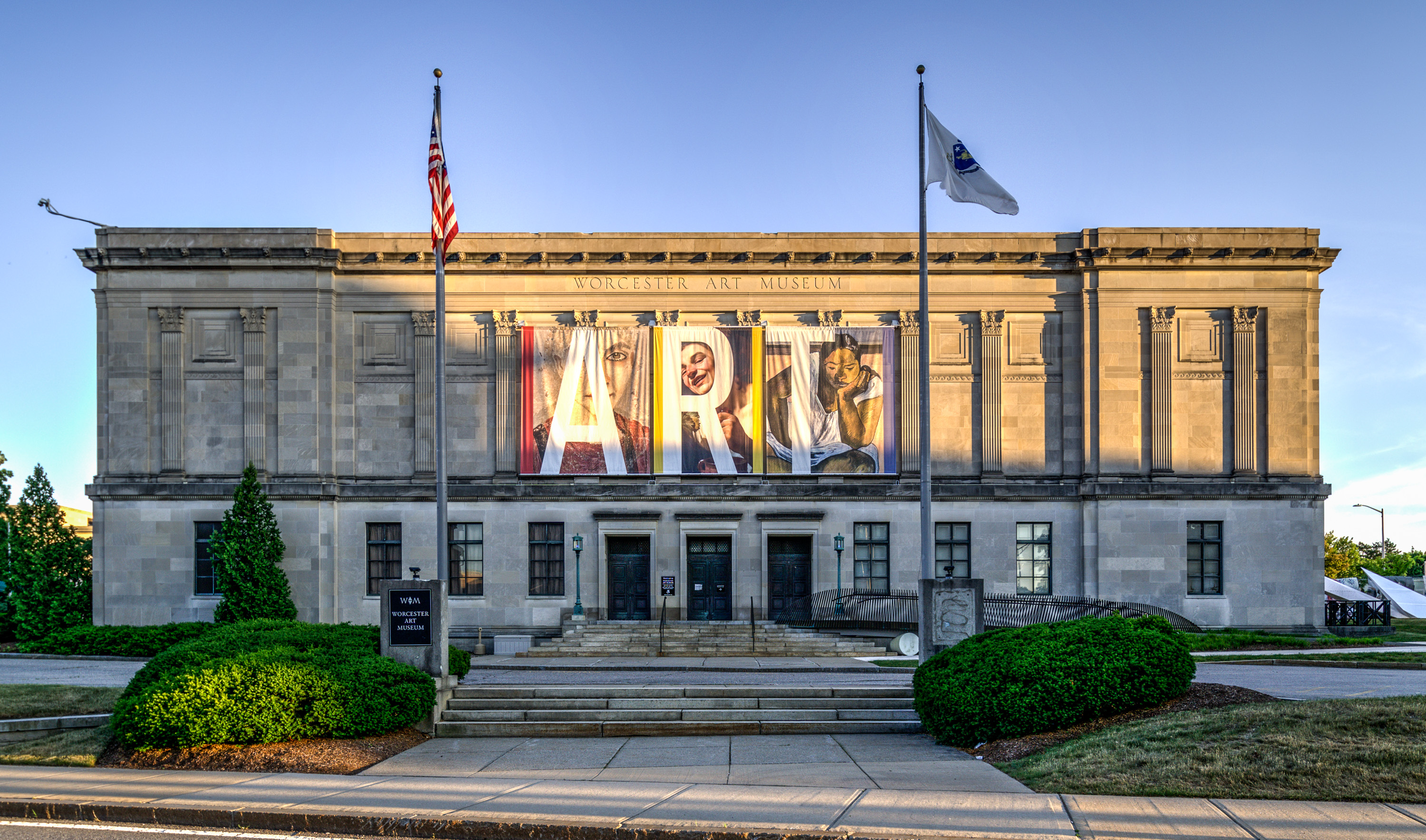
- Date: May 17, 1972
- Time: Evening (EST)
- Duration: 5 minutes
- Venue: Worcester Art Museum
- Location: Worcester, Massachusetts, US; 42°16′24″N 71°48′7″W
- Outcome: 5 suspects arrested and paintings recovered
- Convicted: David Aquafresca, Carol Naster, William J. Carlson, Stephen A. Thoren, Florian Monday

On May 17, 1972, thieves stole four paintings – worth more than a million dollars total – from the Worcester Art Museum in Worcester, Massachusetts, United States. The paintings were recovered in the hayloft of a nearby pig farm a month later. The two robbers and three accomplices were arrested and convicted. Several sources consider the robbery the incident that popularized art heists in the United States. The incident also served as an inspiration for the 2025 film The Mastermind.

== Background ==
The Worcester Art Museum was founded in 1896 by politician and philanthropist Stephen Salisbury III who wanted people of all backgrounds to learn about and view artworks from around the world. The building was designed by architect Stephen C. Earle. Following construction at a cost of $100,000, it opened on May 10, 1898.

In 1921, a two-story structure was attached to the rear of the original structure, which enabled the museum to add three new galleries. Nonetheless, museum director Raymond Wyer was not satisfied with the additions, claiming that not enough space was added. In 1931, construction on a new wing 1.5 times larger than the original museum building began. It was completed in 1933 and named "The Renaissance Court".

At the time of the robbery, the Worcester Art Museum had security guards on duty. However, as in many art museums at the time, security resources shrank due to funding cutbacks amid high inflation rates. Furthermore, the Worcester Art Museum had a circular drive out front of the building, making escape for criminals easy. In addition to the funding problems, earlier high profile art museum thefts in 1961 and 1966 revealed how easy it was for thieves to remove paintings from walls and leave undetected.

== Robbery ==
In the weeks leading up to the robbery, career criminal Florian "Al" Monday cased the museum. He decided that security was lax enough for his accomplices to steal artworks without causing a disturbance.

Just before closing on May 17, 28-year-old William J. Carlson and 30-year-old Stephen A. Thoren entered the museum and began taking paintings down from their exhibits. Visitors saw them removing the paintings from the exhibit, but did nothing, assuming that the two were museum employees. After removing the paintings from their exhibit, the thieves put them in plastic bags, and put on ski masks. During the course of the robbery, two high school girls encountered the men stealing the paintings. One of the men forced the two girls to lie on the ground at gunpoint and told them to keep quiet. The girls noted that the men were not arbitrary in which paintings they were taking. The thieves stole four paintings: Mother and Child by a Fountain by Pablo Picasso, The Brooding Woman by Paul Gauguin, Mademoiselle Manthey by Paul Gauguin, and St. Bartholomew by Rembrandt. Together, all four paintings were valued at more than one million dollars.

The two thieves then ran down the Renaissance Court stairs and across the 1,700-year-old Worcester Hunt Mosaic in the interior courtyard towards the entrance, where they encountered a security guard. The guard did not initially suspect the men of stealing paintings, but was more concerned that they were walking across a Byzantine-era artwork. He attempted to stop one of the men by grabbing him by the waist. After a brief struggle, one of the thieves shot the guard in the hip with a .22 caliber gun.

The thieves then ran out the exit at the main entrance and onto the circular driveway where 22-year-old David Aquafresca was waiting inside a 1965 Oldsmobile station wagon that had been stolen in nearby Auburn. Coincidentally, two other girls who were friends with the girls who encountered the robbers stealing the paintings were in the driveway waiting for the first two girls to leave the museum. However, after completing a joyride, the girls parked their car in front of the thieves' car, inadvertently blocking their escape. One of the thieves pointed a gun at the two girls, demanding that they move. The girls complied, and the trio fled the museum. They then drove the car less than a mile (1.6 km) to the Worcester Polytechnic Institute and abandoned it. The police recovered the car the next day.

== Stolen works ==
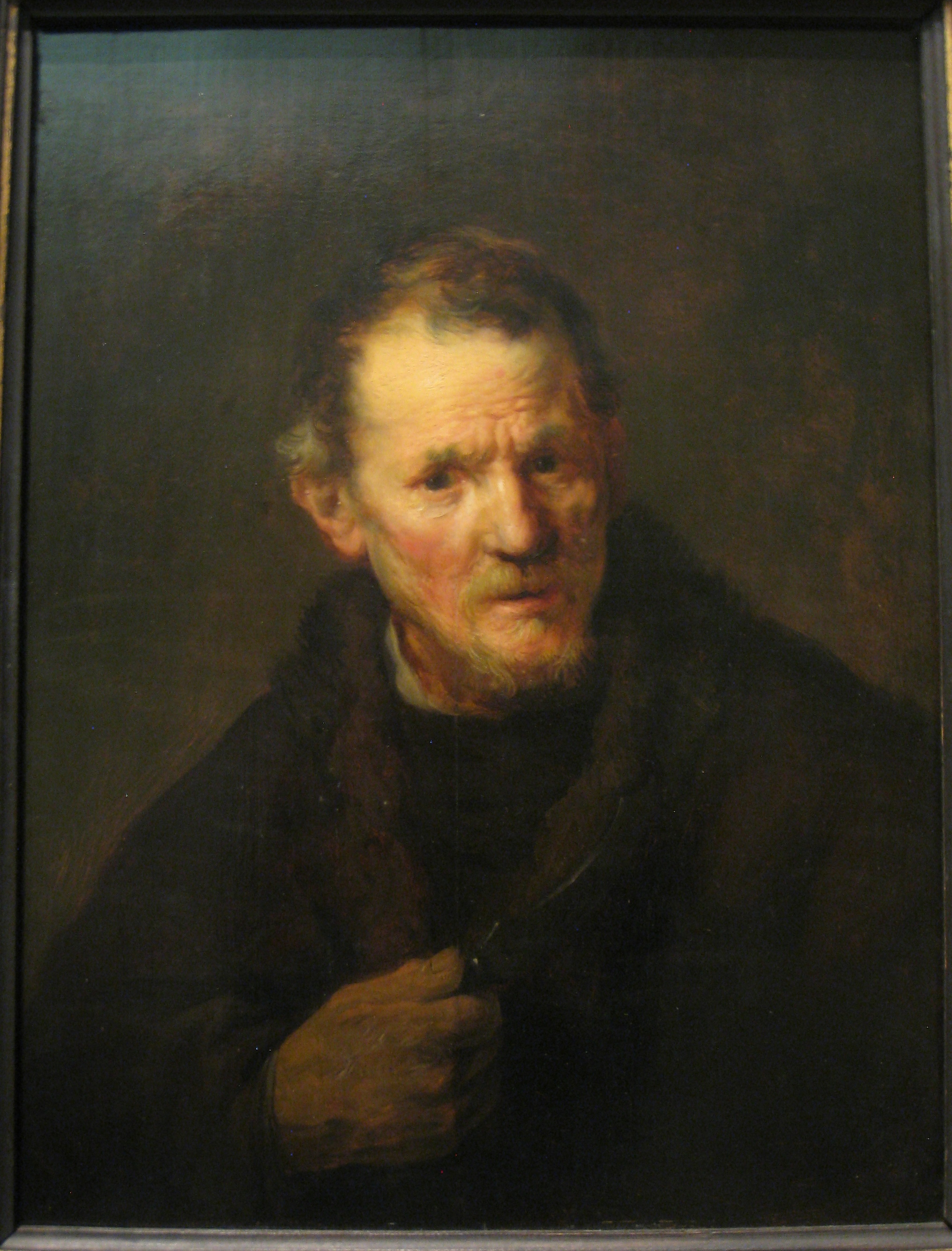
St. Bartholomew by Rembrandt van Rijn

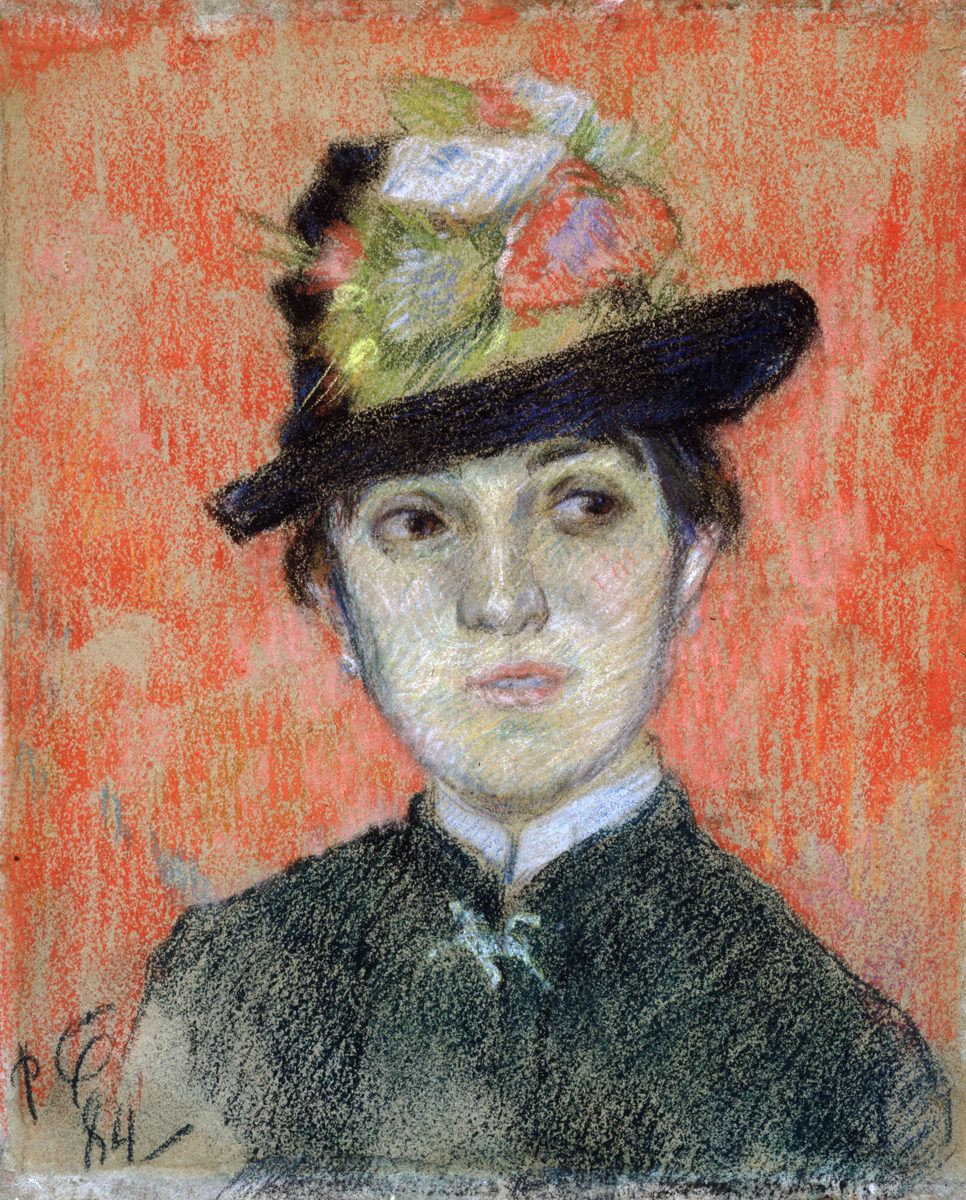
Mademoiselle Manthey by Paul Gauguin

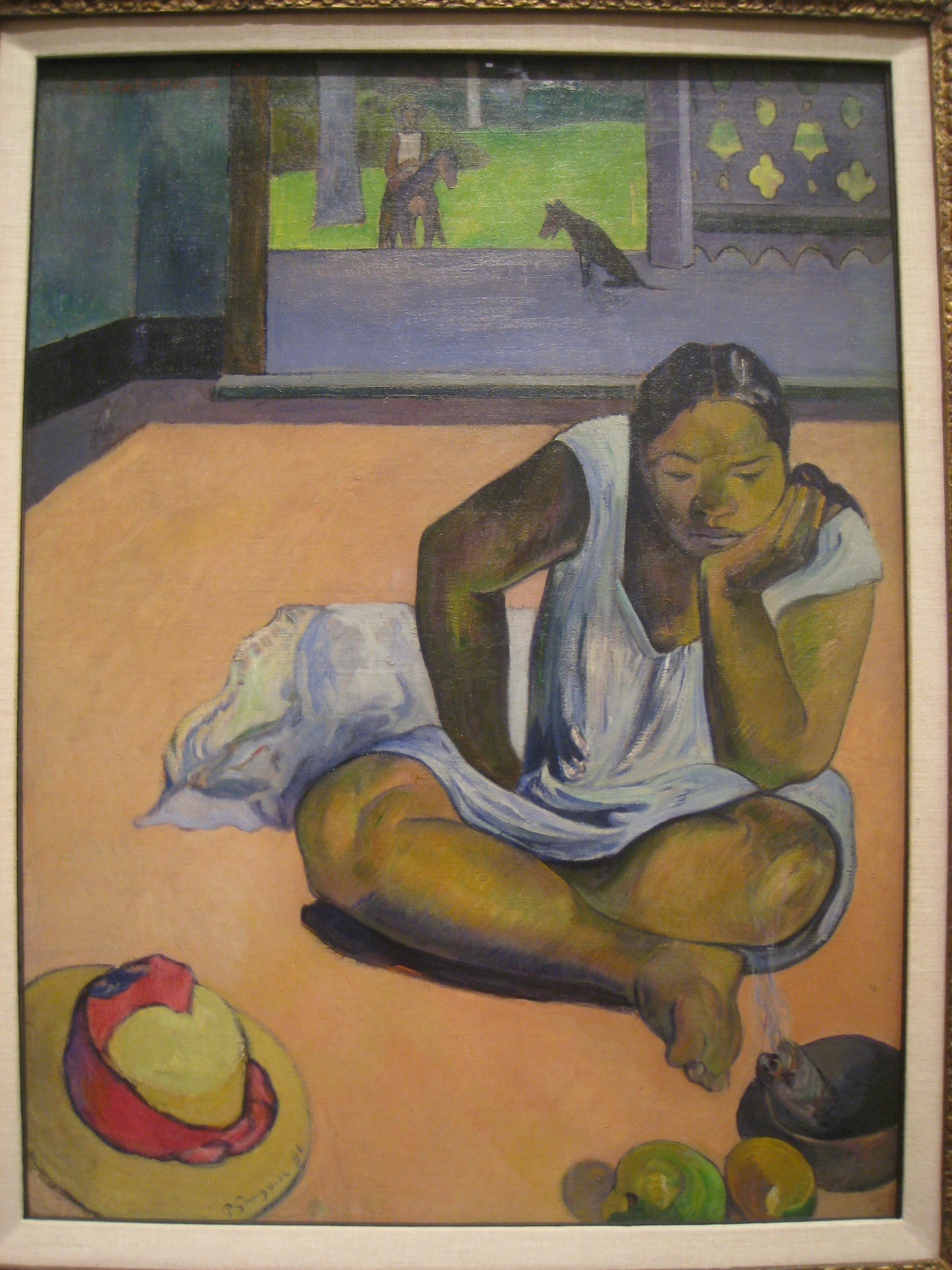
The Brooding Woman by Paul Gauguin

Mother and Child by a Fountain by Pablo Picasso

== Investigation and arrests ==
The robbery became a national story by the next day, with the FBI and United States Customs Service officials becoming involved in the investigation. The museum's director noted that the paintings were so well-known that they would have a hard time selling them in the United States without getting caught. Art experts feared that the thieves would try to sell them abroad.

Not long after the robbery was completed, the thieves began bragging about their actions at a bar. On May 20, police arrested Carlson and 30-year-old Carol Naster. Carlson was charged with being involved in the robbery itself, while Naster was charged for being an accessory to the robbery. Police arrested Thoren and Aquafresca on May 21. Like Carlson, both men were charged with being involved in the robbery itself.

By May 24, police named Florian Monday as a fifth person of interest in the robbery. The paintings were eventually recovered after being found hidden in the hayloft of a Rhode Island pig farm around June 12. Museum administrator Laurence Maloy reported that the Rembrandt painting had slight water damage on the varnish, while the Gauguin's Brooding Woman painting had a small scratch. Monday was arrested in Montreal in July 1974.

Although some of the thieves initially pleaded not guilty to the robbery, all five were convicted. Aquafresca, Carlson, Naster, and Monday were sentenced to prison time, while Thoren was placed on probation.

== Aftermath ==
In the years after the robbery, various sources began to consider the Worcester Art Museum robbery the incident that popularized art heists, even though smaller-scale thefts previously occurred. After acquiring the rights to a non-fiction book on the subject in 2016, journalists Casey Sherman and Dave Wedge announced that they were working on making a film about the robbery.

In 2022, film director Kelly Reichardt was inspired to create a movie about an art robbery after reading about the 50th anniversary of the heist. Production of the film began by November 2024. The film was titled The Mastermind and had its premiere at the Cannes Film Festival on May 23, 2025, where it was nominated for the Palme d'Or.

== See also ==
- 1972 in art
- 1972 in the United States
- 1972 Montreal Museum of Fine Arts robbery
- Isabella Stewart Gardner Museum theft (1990)
- Frankfurt art theft (1994)
- Nationalmuseum robbery (2000)
- 2011 Montreal Museum of Fine Arts theft
- 2019 Dresden heist
- 2025 Louvre heist
