= America Today =

Painting by Thomas Hart Benton

- Instruments of Power
- Artist: Thomas Hart Benton
- Year: 1930–1931
- Medium: tempera on wood
- Location: Metropolitan Museum of Art, New York
- Website: The Met

America Today is a mural comprising ten canvas panels, painted with egg tempera in 1930–1931 by the American painter Thomas Hart Benton. It provides a panorama of American life throughout the 1920s, based on Benton's extensive travels in the country. Originally commissioned for the New School for Social Research building at 66 West 12th Street, it has belonged to the Metropolitan Museum of Art, in New York, since 2012.

== Panels ==
Title	Dimensions
Instruments of Power	92 x 160 in. (233.7 x 406.4 cm)
City Activities with Dance Hall	92 x 134 1/2 in. (233.7 x 341.6 cm)
City Activities with Subway	92 x 134 1/2 in. (233.7 x 341.6 cm)
Deep South	92 x 117 in. (233.7 x 297.2 cm)
Midwest	92 x 117 in. (233.7 x 297.2 cm)
Changing West	92 x 117 in. (233.7 x 297.2 cm)
Coal	92 x 117 in. (233.7 x 297.2 cm)
Steel	92 x 117 in. (233.7 x 297.2 cm)
City Building	92 x 117 in. (233.7 x 297.2 cm)
Outreaching Hands	17 1/8 x 97 in. (43.5 x 246.4 cm)

== Creation ==
The mural was commissioned in 1929 by Alvin Saunders Johnson, director of The New School for Social Research in New York City, for the school's boardroom at 66 West 12th Street. Benton was not offered any payment beyond material costs. Instead, he saw the work as an opportunity to make a name for himself and thereby get more commissions in the future. The subjects were based on Benton's extensive travels in the United States. Benton said about the work: "Every detail of every picture is a thing I myself have seen and known. Every head is a real person drawn from life." The mural was painted with egg tempera on linen canvases.

== Provenance ==
The mural was acquired by AXA Equitable Life Insurance Company in 1984. After two years of renovation it was installed at AXA's headquarters at 787 Seventh Avenue in New York City. In 1996 AXA moved to 1290 Avenue of the Americas and installed the mural in the building's lobby. In January 2012 the mural was renovated again, and in December 2012 it was donated to the Metropolitan Museum of Art.
