= The Mastermind (film) =

2025 film by Kelly Reichardt

- American theatrical release poster
- Directed by: Kelly Reichardt
- Written by: Kelly Reichardt
- Produced by: Neil Kopp; Anish Savjani; Vincent Savino
- Starring: Josh O'Connor; Alana Haim; Hope Davis; John Magaro; Gaby Hoffmann; Bill Camp
- Cinematography: Christopher Blauvelt
- Edited by: Kelly Reichardt
- Music by: Rob Mazurek
- Production company: Filmscience
- Distributed by: Mubi
- Release dates: May 23, 2025 (Cannes); October 17, 2025 (United States); October 24, 2025 (United Kingdom)
- Running time: 110 minutes
- Countries: United Kingdom; United States
- Language: English
- Box office: $2 million

The Mastermind is a 2025 heist film written and directed by Kelly Reichardt. It stars Josh O'Connor, Alana Haim, Hope Davis, John Magaro, Gaby Hoffmann and Bill Camp. Set in 1970, the film follows a struggling family man who plots to steal art from a suburban museum while the US rages over the Vietnam War. Reichardt described it as a struggle between the allure of individualism and the necessity of collective action. The film was inspired by a mixture of real-life events and classic films, including the 1972 robbery of the Worcester Art Museum and the films of Jean-Pierre Melville.

The film had its world premiere at the 2025 Cannes Film Festival on May 23, 2025, where it competed for the Palme d'Or, and was released in the United States by Mubi on October 17, 2025.

== Plot ==
In 1970 Framingham, Massachusetts, an unemployed carpenter, James Blaine "JB" Mooney, plots to steal four Arthur Dove paintings from the local art museum. He borrows money from his mother under the pretense of using it for work so he can pay three men to pull off the heist. The getaway driver, Larry Duffy, provides a stolen car but backs out of the heist. JB drives the two thieves, Guy Hickey and Ronnie Gibson, to the museum, where they steal the paintings. During the heist, Gibson pulls a gun on a student and beats up a security guard.

JB hides the paintings in a barn and returns home to find the FBI questioning his family. The FBI inform him that Ronnie was arrested after robbing a bank and named JB as the mastermind of the heist. JB denies this and asks his furious wife, Terri, to take their sons Carl and Tommy to his parents' house. Tommy at first refuses to go with her.

Guy calls JB to press him for more money. When JB takes Tommy along to meet him, an organized crime outfit abducts JB and forces him to take them to the paintings. As his role in the robbery is made public, JB goes into hiding with Fred and Maude, his friends from art school. While Fred is excited by JB's story, Maude privately confronts him, having deduced that JB's plan was to use their former professor, an admirer of Dove, as a fence to sell the paintings. She asks him to leave. JB rejects Fred's suggestion to hide out at his brother's Toronto commune in favor of traveling to Cleveland to stay with friends. There, he learns that they have left town and hitchhikes to Cincinnati.

JB reads that the paintings had been recovered. He calls Terri and attempts to rationalize his actions, but she hangs up when he asks for money. Unable to afford the bus fare to Toronto, he steals an elderly woman's pocketbook and escapes into a crowd of anti-Vietnam War protesters. The police violently break up the rally and arrest JB along with several protesters.

== Cast ==
- Josh O'Connor as James Blaine "JB" Mooney
- Alana Haim as Terri Mooney, JB's wife
- Sterling Thompson as Carl Mooney, JB's son
- Jasper Thompson as Tommy Mooney, JB's other son
- Hope Davis as Sarah Mooney, JB's mother
- Bill Camp as Judge William Mooney, JB's father
- John Magaro as Fred, JB's art school friend
- Gaby Hoffmann as Maude, JB's art school friend and Fred's wife
- Eli Gelb as Guy Hickey, JB's hired thief
- Cole Doman as Larry Duffy, JB's hired thief
- Javion Allen as Ronnie Gibson, JB's hired thief
- Matthew Maher as Jerry
- Rhenzy Feliz as Gordon
- D.J. Stroud as Edward Farber
- Amanda Plummer as Louise

== Production ==
In September 2024, it was reported that Kelly Reichardt would write and direct the art heist film The Mastermind. Neil Kopp, Anish Savjani, and Vincent Savino would produce for Filmscience, with Mubi financing the film and distributing in North America. Josh O'Connor would star in the film. In October 2024, Alana Haim and John Magaro joined the cast. On November 13, 2024, it was reported that production had begun, with Hope Davis, Bill Camp, Gaby Hoffmann, Amanda Plummer, Eli Gelb, Cole Doman, Javion Allen, Matthew Maher, and Rhenzy Feliz having joined the cast.

=== Inspirations ===
Reichardt had a long-running fascination with art thefts, and had been collecting newspaper clippings about heists for years. She remarked that in the 1970s, it was relatively easy to steal art, and that the Isabella Stewart Gardner Museum heist happened because there were "acid heads running the security." She was specifically inspired by the 1972 robbery of the Worcester Art Museum in Massachusetts, in which two Gauguins, a Picasso, and a Rembrandt were stolen. She started working on the movie after reading about the 50th anniversary of the Worcester heist. She explained that "I'm just fascinated with people stealing art, and the idea of taking something from a public space to enjoy on your own, like the people that had the de Kooning in their bedroom. Instead of everyone enjoying this painting, it'll just be you behind your bedroom door." Although many Reichardt films are shot in the Pacific Northwest, Reichardt set the film in Massachusetts because she went to art school in the state and felt that the script "makes sense [as] a Massachusetts story."

The film's setting highlights the decline of 1960s counterculture. Reichardt said that she moved the date of the heist from 1972 to 1970 because the characters needed to be "figuring out what's next" as a country, because at the end of the 1960s, "[t]his whole freewheeling thing's not working out." In addition, the film's narrative parallels "the unconventional narratives of [1970s] New Hollywood [cinema] that were populated by offbeat antiheroes." Living in a comfortable suburb, and with no risk of being drafted, JB has the luxury of not being "tuned in to the political climate," although reality remains "just on the edges of the frame." She noted that JB was "rebelling against his middle-class life" without "a clear idea of what the alternative would be," and "mindlessly[] ... take[s] advantage of his privilege whenever he is in trouble or whenever he needs to."

JB's unfocused rebellion ties into a common Reichardt theme, "the individual versus the person in a community." Like Robert Bresson's Pickpocket (1959), the film is structured as an "exploration of a sinner, why he sins, and the consequences of those sins." Reichardt said that the film was in part about the "cost" of "personal freedom," explaining that "being able to be the outlaw is a privilege" and that JB relies on the women in his life to "carr[y] the weight" of his antics. She added that the film questions whether a person can "really remain separate from what's going on around [them]."

JB's choice of what art to steal reflects his own personal tastes, rather than profit maximization. O'Connor said that "there's a sort of ego there ... 'I'll steal the artists that only real artists know about.'" In the film, JB steals four real Arthur Dove paintings: Tree Forms (1932), Willow Tree (1937), Tanks & Snowbanks (1938), and Yellow, Blue-Green and Brown (1941). However, he passes up the chance to steal more famous paintings, some of which reside in Washington, D.C.'s National Gallery of Art, such as John Singer Sargent's Street in Venice, Mary Cassatt's Child in a Straw Hat, Frederic Edwin Church's Niagara, and Thomas Cole's The Voyage of Life: Youth. Artnet explained that while Dove was "a respected artist whose works hang in some of America’s greatest museums ... the only way he would make headlines in the art press today is if someone staged a heist of his works." Reichardt noted that even in the 1970s, Dove was not the most popular artist, and that she liked how JB's focus on Dove "lowers the stakes" and was a better fit for "the size of my film" and "the ambitions of this character."

=== Style ===
The film plays with genre expectations and has been described as an "anti-heist movie." Reichardt explained while she was heavily inspired by the heist films of Jean-Pierre Melville, she did not want to focus on the process of the heist as much as Melville would. She was more interested in the "unwinding" of JB's plan than the plan itself, and said that "if you went to this film thinking it was a heist film, you might be pissed." However, she noted that the heist film formula existed for a reason and that scripting a film to defy genre conventions required "a lot of trial and error."

Reichardt scripted the character of JB like a Bresson actor, "a sort of blank character that you can project onto." She praised Josh O'Connor for "set[ting] aside ego" to play the part. Manohla Dargis explained that "[o]ne of the trickier things about JB as a character is that he isn't obviously likable or dislikable, which makes it hard to get a handle on him." Sarah Belmont agreed that "figuring out who [JB] is and what drives him becomes almost as important as knowing if he will get away with his master plan."

== Release ==
In April 2025, The Mastermind was announced to be competing for the Palme d'Or at the 2025 Cannes Film Festival, where it had its world premiere on May 23, 2025. It also screened at the 2025 New York Film Festival. The film was theatrically released on October 17, 2025. It screened in the Masters section of the 2025 Stockholm International Film Festival on November 8, 2025 and the From The Festivals - 2025 section of the 56th International Film Festival of India in November 2025.

== Reception ==
=== Critical response ===
On the review aggregator website Rotten Tomatoes, 90% of 155 critics' reviews are positive, with an average rating of 7.5/10. The website's consensus reads: "Kelly Reichardt crafts a heist film at her own laconic pace with The Mastermind, a contemplative crime drama that glides along Josh O'Connor's effortless watchability and a sumptuously vintage aesthetic." Metacritic, which uses a weighted average, assigned the film a score of 80 out of 100, based on 37 critics, indicating "generally favorable" reviews.

Tim Grierson of ScreenDaily considered that the protagonist's story "connects to something larger about an America losing its way". Peter Bradshaw described The Mastermind as "quietly gripping" in his 4 out of 5 stars review of the film in The Guardian. David Rooney of The Hollywood Reporter pitched the film as "an artful exercise in genre reinvention".

=== Accolades ===
Award	Date of ceremony	Category	Recipient(s)	Result	Ref.
Cannes Film Festival	May 24, 2025	Palme d'Or	Kelly Reichardt	Nominated	
Sydney Film Festival	June 15, 2025	Sydney Film Prize	The Mastermind	Nominated	
Miskolc International Film Festival	September 13, 2025	Emeric Pressburger Prize	The Mastermind	Nominated	
Valladolid International Film Festival	November 1, 2025	Golden Spike	The Mastermind	Won (Note: Award shared with Magellan.)	
Valladolid International Film Festival	November 1, 2025	Best Cinematography	Christopher Blauvelt	Won	
Gotham Independent Film Awards	December 1, 2025	Best Director	Kelly Reichardt	Nominated	
Gotham Independent Film Awards	December 1, 2025	Outstanding Lead Performance	Josh O'Connor	Nominated	
