= City of Vancouver Archives =

Coordinates: 49.260884°N 123.113938°W

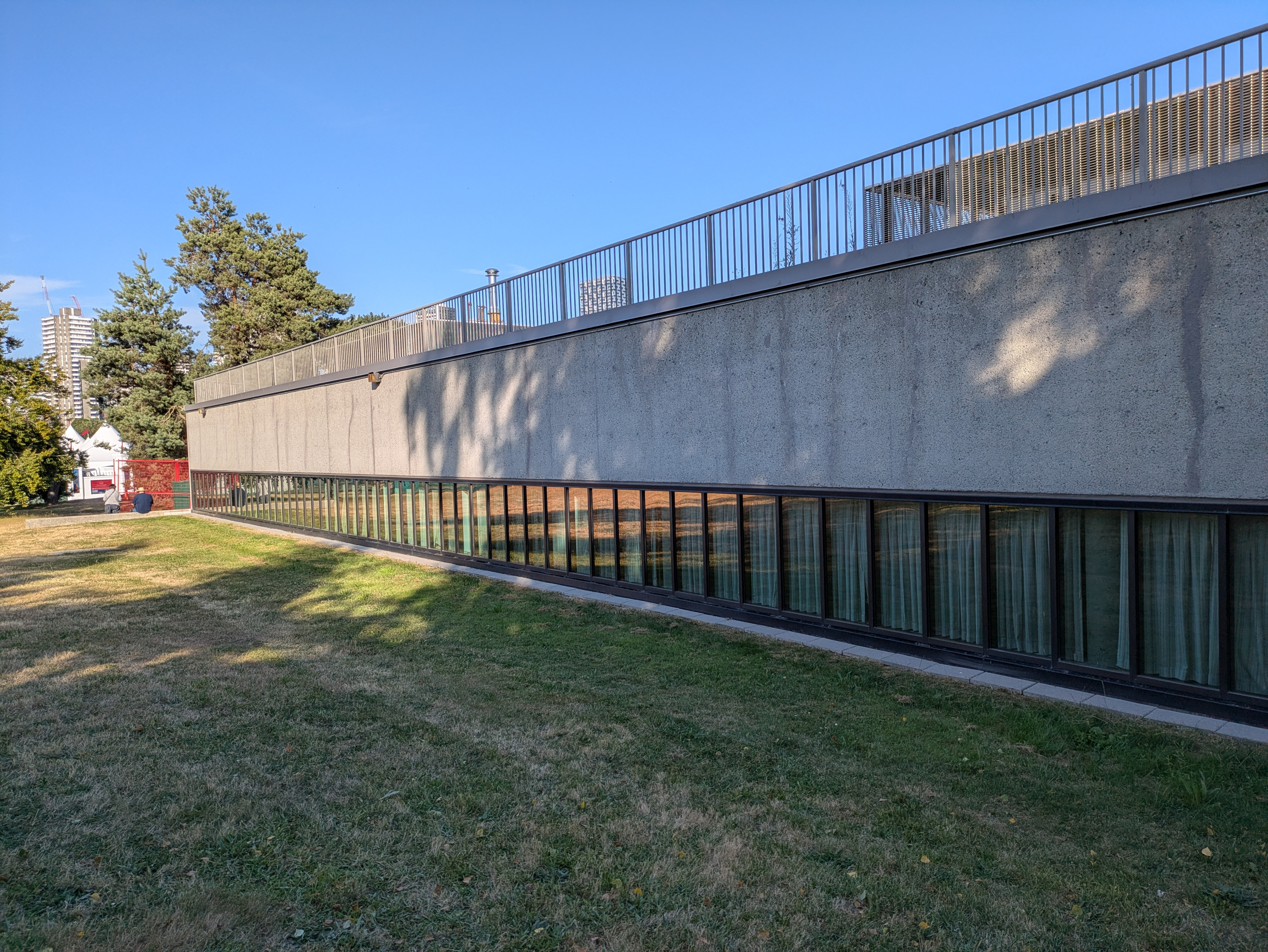
City of Vancouver Archives

The City of Vancouver Archives is the City of Vancouver's official archival repository for government documents, as well as the home to many personal and corporate records telling the story of the community. The archives serves as the repository for historical records generated by the City of Vancouver, including the Mayor's Office, the Parks Board, the Board of Police Commissioners, the Vancouver Police Department, and the Office of the City Clerk. It also contains numerous collections from private donors, businesses, and community groups. The archives are part of the City Clerk's Department.

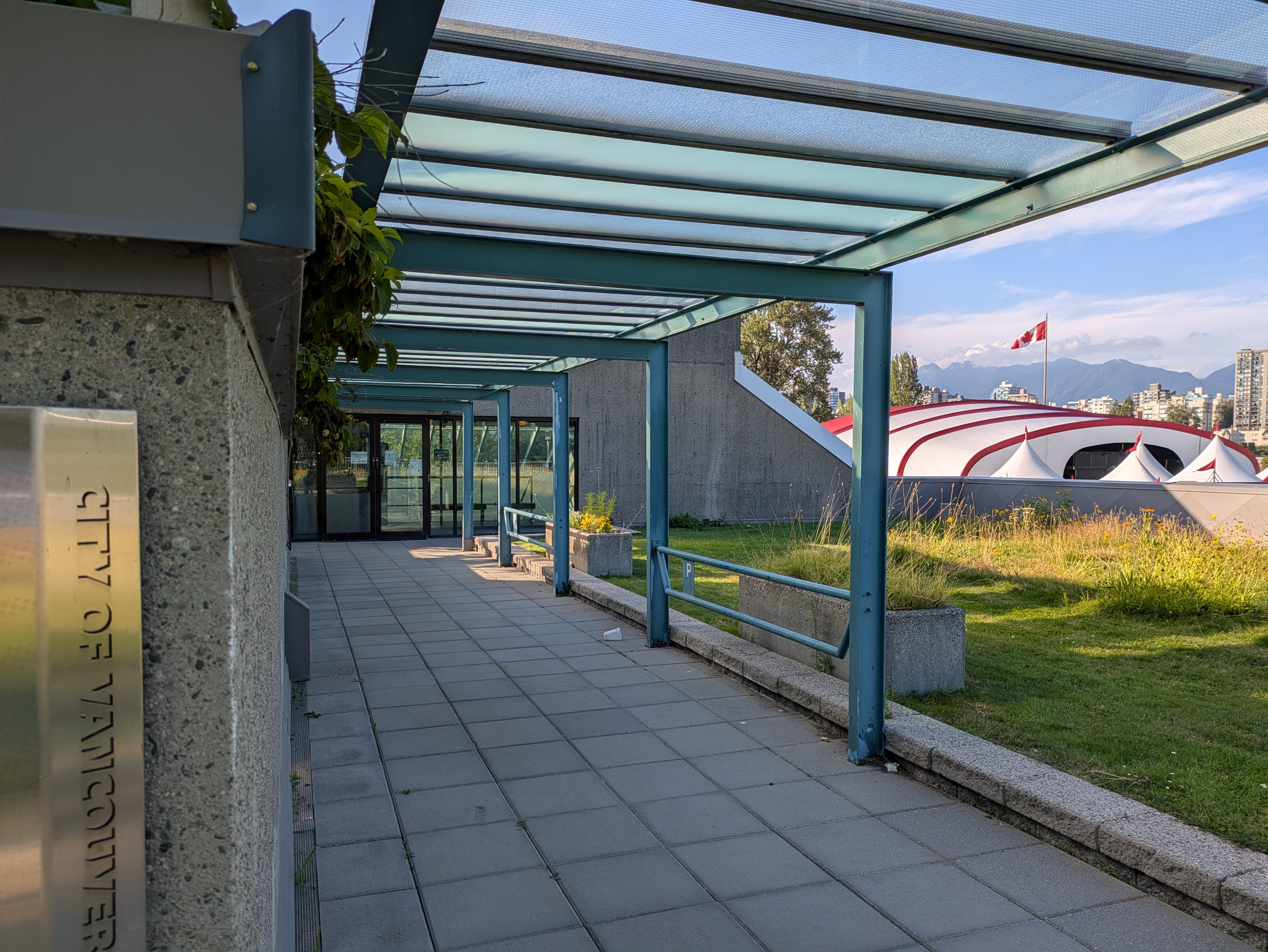
City of Vancouver Archives

== History ==
The archives began as the personal collection of J. S. Matthews, who was born in Wales, and settled in Vancouver in 1898. For decades he collected and catalogued artifacts, solicited donations, interviewed early inhabitants of the young city, and wrote historical narratives.

The archives began in Major Matthews' home until he was eventually given space by the City in various locations and was officially made the City's archivist in 1933. He moved the collection back into his home for a period following a dispute with Mayor Gerry McGeer over ownership of the collection. The archives did not find a permanent home in his lifetime, but were given to the city with the condition of a dedicated building in his will within one year after his death in 1970.

== Facilities ==
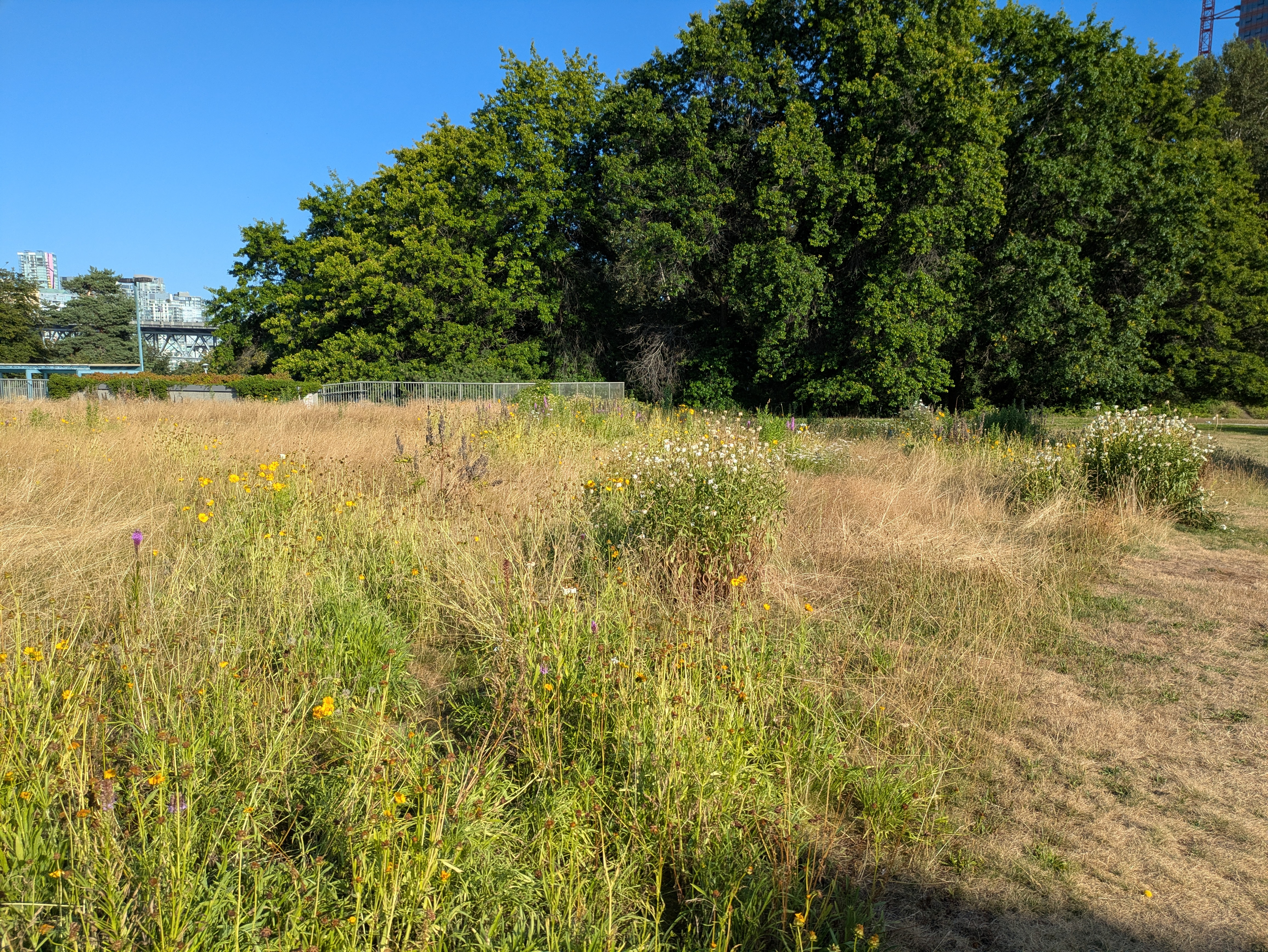
Landscaping above the archives

The first space provided for the archives by the city was in the attic of the old City Hall on Main Street, in 1931. In 1933, the archives moved to the temporary City Hall in the Holden Building on East Hastings Street. In 1936, the archives moved again to the new City Hall at Cambie Street and West 12th Avenue. In 1959, the archives moved again to space in the Main Library on Burrard Street.

The current archives building, located in Vanier Park at 1150 Chestnut Street, was designed by architect Chris Blencowe in the office of McCarter Nairne and Partners. To minimise loss of parkland, a series of accessible landscaped platforms were created over the large storage areas; the approach to the entrance, exhibition lobby and reading room being via a glass-roofed walkway giving views to the city. When the building was opened in 1972, it was the first building in Canada built specifically as a city archive.

== City Archivists ==
- 1933–1970 J. S. Matthews
- 1971–1973 Robert Watt
