= Girl in a Wetsuit =

Sculpture by Elek Imredy in Vancouver, British Columbia, Canada

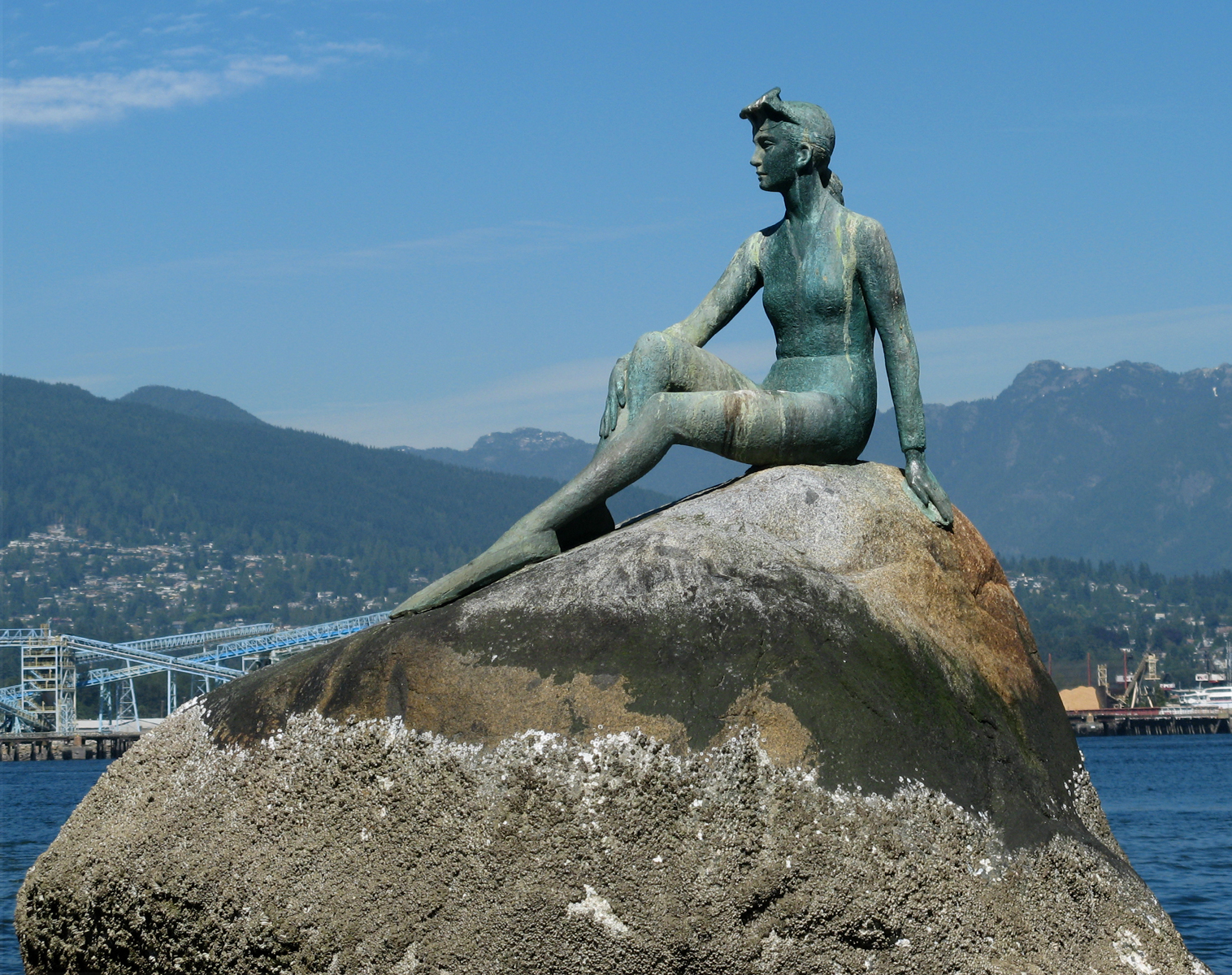
- The sculpture in 2007
- Artist: Elek Imredy
- Year: 1972
- Type: Sculpture
- Medium: Bronze
- Location: Vancouver; 49°18′09″N 123°07′33″W

Girl in a Wetsuit is a life-size 1972 bronze sculpture by Elek Imredy of a woman in a wetsuit, located on a rock in the water along the north side of Stanley Park, Vancouver, British Columbia, Canada.

== Description ==
The bronze sculpture depicts a friend of Imredy's, Debra Harrington, in a wetsuit with flippers on her feet and a mask on her forehead. Although some believe it was a replica of Copenhagen's The Little Mermaid, the creator has said:

I didn't believe we should have a copy of the mermaid. She is rightfully a symbol of Copenhagen... I proposed to have a life-size scuba diver seated there. At that time scuba diving was getting quite popular here in Vancouver and, just as important, I didn't know of any similar sculpture anywhere in the world. It was a new idea… There was tremendous opposition and great controversy. I still don't know why.

== See also ==
- 1972 in art
