= Charles Pollock =

American abstract painter

Charles Cecil Pollock
- Born: December 25, 1902
- Died: May 8, 1988 (aged 85)
- Known for: Painting
- Spouse(s): Elizabeth Feinberg; Sylvia Winter Pollock

Charles Cecil Pollock (December 25, 1902 – May 8, 1988) was an American abstract painter and the eldest brother of artist Jackson Pollock.

== Biography ==
Pollock was born on December 25, 1902, in Denver, Colorado. He was the eldest of five brothers born to Stella May McClure and LeRoy Pollock. His father, who was born as a McCoy, had taken the surname of his parents' neighbors, who adopted him after his own parents died within a year of each other.

In 1926, Pollock moved to New York to study painting. In 1930, he and another brother, Frank Pollock, persuaded their brother Jackson to join them there, effectively launching his own artistic career.

In 1935, he moved to Washington, D.C. to work with the Resettlement Administration. Two years later, he took a job as a political cartoonist for the United Automobile Workers' newspaper in Detroit, Michigan. From 1938 to 1942 Pollock supervised Mural Painting and Graphic Arts for the Works Progress Administration (WPA)'s Federal Art Project in Michigan. After visiting Michigan State University in 1942, he joined the faculty in the Art Department, where he would teach for the next two decades.

== Artistic style ==
Charles Pollock's career as a painter is sharply divided into two periods. Until the mid 1940s, Pollock followed the social realist movement, studying under Thomas Hart Benton at the Art Students League of New York. Pollock was inspired by the works of the Mexican Mural Renaissance, particularly the works of Diego Rivera and José Clemente Orozco. During the Great Depression and the New Deal era of the 1930s, Pollock began working for the Resettlement Administration, alongside fellow Social Realist Ben Shahn, supervising murals through the Midwestern and Southern United States. Pollock was then selected as supervisor of the mural painting and graphic arts division of the Federal Art Project, settling in Detroit, Michigan.

Charles Pollock abandoned social realism in the 1940s, and turned to abstract expressionism and color field painting. Some attribute the shift to the influence of his famous brother Jackson, although Charles Pollock painted in a very calm and organized manner unlike Jackson's drip painting style.

== Legacy ==
Pollock had painted public works projects for the Michigan State University in the early 1940s, when it was then Michigan State College; three of his murals can be seen in the Auditorium foyer. A collection of Pollock's later abstract expressionist works are housed in Paris, the city where Pollock died in 1988. The Smithsonian American Art Museum also houses dozens of works by Charles Pollock.
