= Apodaca =

Apodaca, Nuevo León
- City and municipality
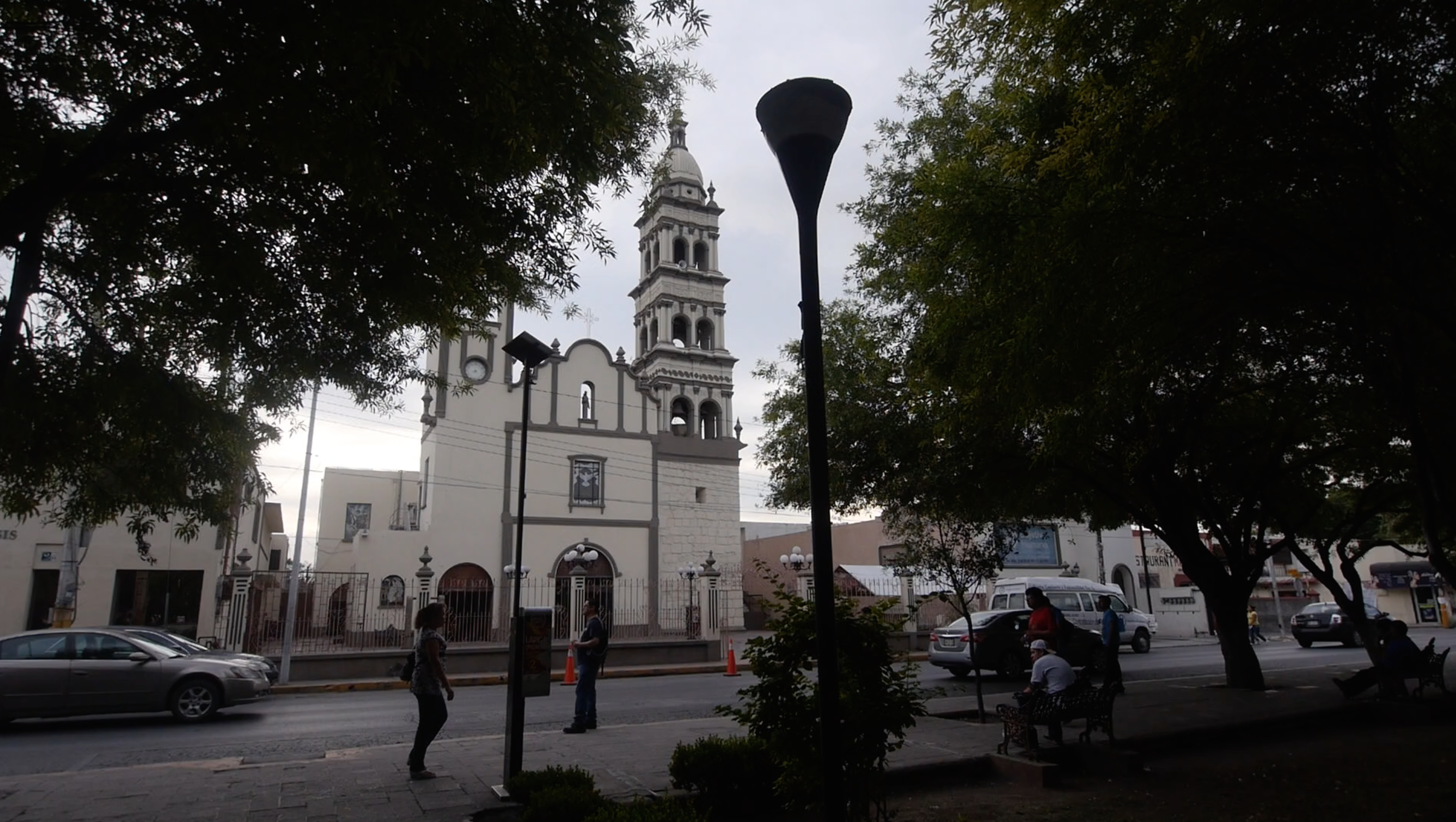
- San Francisco de Asis Parish
- Motto: Progreso con Libertad y Justicia (Progress with Freedom and Justice)
- Location within Nuevo León Location within Mexico
- Coordinates: 25°46′54″N 100°11′19″W
- Country: Mexico
- State: Nuevo León
- Founded: 1585

Government
  - Mayor: César Garza Villarreal (PRI)
  - Federal electoral district: NL-2 & NL-8

Area
  - Municipality: 224.7 km^{2} (86.8 sq mi)
  - City: 89.2 km^{2} (34.4 sq mi)
- Elevation: 405 m (1,329 ft)

Population (2020 census)
  - Municipality: 656,464
  - Density: 2,922/km^{2} (7,567/sq mi)
  - Metro: 5,341,177
  - City: 536,436
  - City density: 6,010/km^{2} (15,600/sq mi)
- Time zone: UTC-6 (Zona Centro)
- Website: www.apodaca.gob.mx

Apodaca (Spanish pronunciation: [apoˈðaka]) is a city and its surrounding municipality that is part of Monterrey Metropolitan area. It lies in the northeastern part of the Monterrey Metropolitan Area. It is known for becoming recently a heavy industrialized city. As of 2019, the city houses 70% of the industrial plants of the state of Nuevo León. Apodaca is as well the fourth most exporting city in México. The municipality has an area of 224.7 km^{2}. The population has recently increased from around 115,000 people in 1990 to almost 600,000 in 2015. As one of the fastest-growing territories in terms of population in the Metropolitan Area, it became the state's third most populous municipality as of 2015. The municipality is home to Monterrey International Airport, which is considered to be the fourth most important in the country and is also one of the municipality's main employers.

== Geography ==
The municipality has an area of 224.7 km^{2}.

=== Climate ===
Climate data for Apodaca (1951–2010)
Month	Jan	Feb	Mar	Apr	May	Jun	Jul	Aug	Sep	Oct	Nov	Dec	Year
Record high °C (°F)	40.0 (104.0)	42.0 (107.6)	48.0 (118.4)	50.0 (122.0)	47.5 (117.5)	46.0 (114.8)	47.0 (116.6)	45.0 (113.0)	44.0 (111.2)	41.0 (105.8)	41.0 (105.8)	38.0 (100.4)	50.0 (122.0)
Mean daily maximum °C (°F)	22.9 (73.2)	24.7 (76.5)	29.5 (85.1)	33.1 (91.6)	35.0 (95.0)	36.9 (98.4)	37.2 (99.0)	37.3 (99.1)	34.0 (93.2)	30.0 (86.0)	26.4 (79.5)	23.3 (73.9)	30.9 (87.6)
Daily mean °C (°F)	14.0 (57.2)	15.4 (59.7)	19.5 (67.1)	23.3 (73.9)	25.8 (78.4)	27.8 (82.0)	28.0 (82.4)	28.2 (82.8)	25.7 (78.3)	21.7 (71.1)	17.7 (63.9)	14.5 (58.1)	21.8 (71.2)
Mean daily minimum °C (°F)	5.1 (41.2)	6.1 (43.0)	9.5 (49.1)	13.5 (56.3)	16.7 (62.1)	18.8 (65.8)	18.9 (66.0)	19.0 (66.2)	17.5 (63.5)	13.5 (56.3)	9.0 (48.2)	5.7 (42.3)	12.8 (55.0)
Record low °C (°F)	−6.5 (20.3)	−7.5 (18.5)	−5.0 (23.0)	0.0 (32.0)	2.5 (36.5)	7.0 (44.6)	8.0 (46.4)	7.0 (44.6)	3.0 (37.4)	−2.0 (28.4)	−5.0 (23.0)	−8.5 (16.7)	−8.5 (16.7)
Average precipitation mm (inches)	16.4 (0.65)	19.8 (0.78)	15.5 (0.61)	39.9 (1.57)	51.5 (2.03)	63.2 (2.49)	65.9 (2.59)	68.7 (2.70)	150.8 (5.94)	54.1 (2.13)	20.4 (0.80)	22.3 (0.88)	588.5 (23.17)
Average precipitation days (≥ 0.1 mm)	3.5	3.6	2.7	3.9	5.4	4.6	3.9	5.2	8.1	5.1	3.3	3.5	52.8
Source: Servicio Meteorologico Nacional

== Transportation ==
Two airports, Monterrey International Airport (IATA: MTY) and Del Norte International Airport (IATA: NTR), are located in Apodaca.

Viva Airline and Grupo Aeroportuario Centro Norte have their corporate headquarters on the grounds of Escobedo Airport.

== Economy ==
The municipality of Apodaca is one of the major industrial centers of the state of Nuevo León. Apodaca's economy is founded basically in manufacturing operations and services.

American companies, such as Whirlpool, General Electric, Polaris Industries, Callaway Golf Company, Parker Hannifin, and Visteon, among many others, have manufacturing operations in Apodaca. Japanese companies such as Denso, Korean companies as LG, Chinese companies as Lenovo, and Danish companies such as Danfoss also have manufacturing facilities in Apodaca.

Las Cruces Golf and Country Club, an 18-hole golf course is located in Apodaca.

== Culture ==
Due to its proximity to Monterrey, Apodaca also served as an origin for many grupero music bands such as Bronco and Los Baron De Apodaca.

== Education ==
The Asociacion Regiomontana de Lengua Japonesa A.C. (モンテレー補習授業校 Monterē Hoshū Jugyō Kō), a Japanese supplementary school, was previously based in Apodaca.

== Origin of the name ==
The city is named after Dr. Salvador Apodaca, bishop of the city of Linares, who was born in Guadalajara in 1769.

== See also ==
- Apodaca Provincial Park (British Columbia, Canada)
- Apodaca (surname)
- Monterrey International Airport
