= Elek Imredy =

Hungarian sculptor

- Born: April 13, 1912; Budapest, Hungary
- Died: October 12, 1994 (aged 82); Vancouver, British Columbia, Canada
- Occupation: Sculptor
- Known for: Sculptures
- Spouse: Peggy Imredy
- Children: daughter Mara

Elek Imredy (April 13, 1912 – October 12, 1994) was a Hungarian sculptor who emigrated to Vancouver, British Columbia, Canada in 1957. His most notable work is Girl in a Wetsuit, which is located in Stanley Park.

== Early life ==
Imredy worked for the railroad in Hungary and studied there with sculptors Sándor Boldogfai Farkas and Béla Ohmann as well as painters István Szőnyi and Vilmos Aba Novák.

== Notable works ==
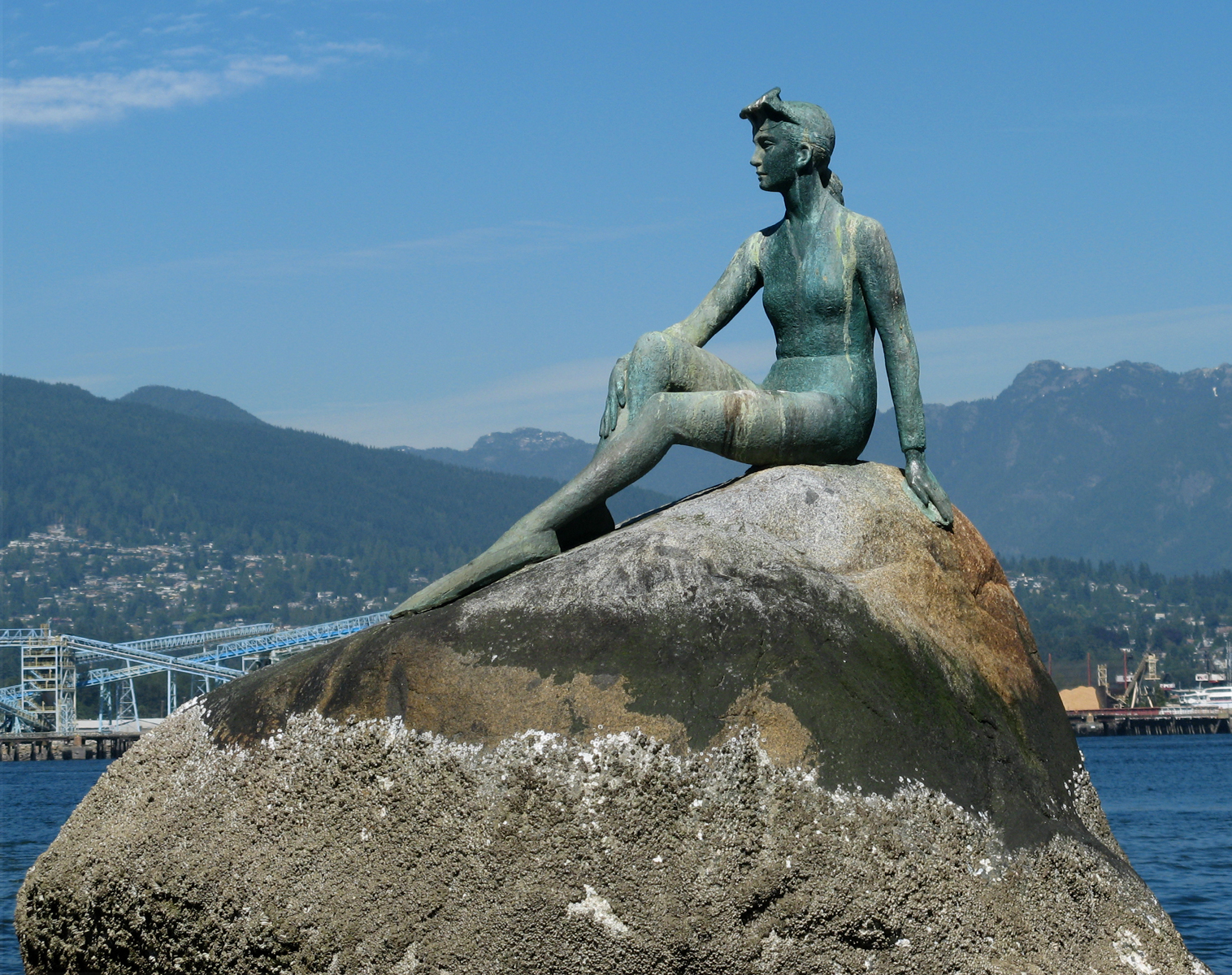
Girl in a Wetsuit in 2007.

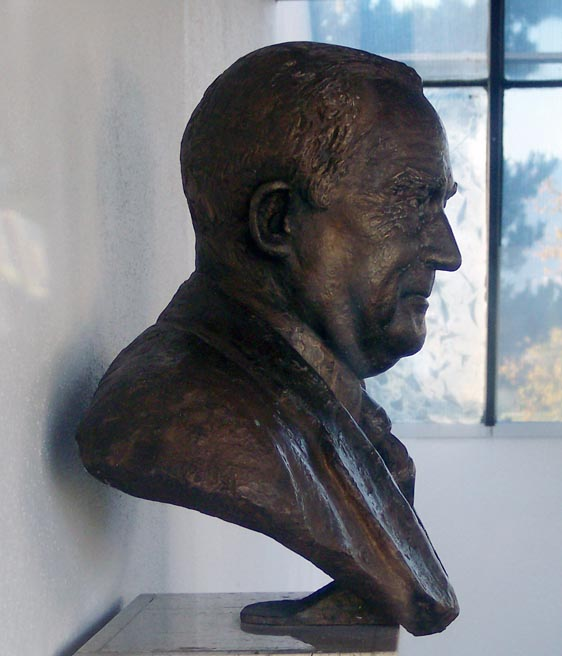
Bust of Major J.S. Matthews at the Vancouver Archives.

- Girl in a Wetsuit in Stanley Park, 1972.
- Statue of Matthew Baillie Begbie, "BCs notorious hanging judge", New Westminster Courthouse, 1981.
- 12' bronze Lady of Justice, New Westminster courthouse.
- Mother goose fiberglass statues for Tacoma's Never Never Land attraction, 1964.
- Seated statue of Christ and one of Madonna, Holy Redeemer College, Edmonton.
- Bronze bust of Dr. George Mercer Dawson, UBC and Riverside Foundation, Calgary.
- Bronze statue of Louis St. Laurent, Department of Public Works, Ottawa.
- Bust of Zoltán Kodály at Vancouver Academy of Music, 1983.
- Grand Trunk Railway president Charles Melville Hays in front of Prince Rupert City Hall.
- The Mariners' Memorial on the Prince Rupert harbour front.
- Bust of Major J.S. Matthews at the Vancouver Archives.
- Bust of child (Anthony Peter Maxwell), 1958.
- Life-size bronze statue of world renown Nisga'a carver, Norman Tait (1941-2016). The piece was age progressed to look older than Norman was at the time in 1970's. The piece was cast from molds of Norman's body. On permanent display as part of First People's collection, Royal British Columbia Museum, Victoria BC.

== See also ==
- List of attractions and monuments in Stanley Park
- Public art in Vancouver
