= Thomas Hart Benton (painter) =

American painter (1889–1975)

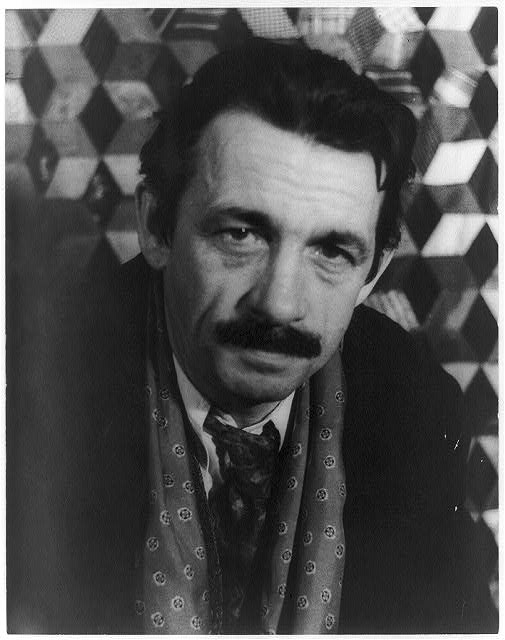
- Benton in 1935
- Born: April 15, 1889; Neosho, Missouri, U.S.
- Died: January 19, 1975 (aged 85); Kansas City, Missouri, U.S.
- Known for: Painting
- Notable work: America Today (1930–31); Indiana Murals (1933); Social History of Missouri (1936); Persephone (1938–39)
- Movement: Regionalism; Social Realism; American modernism; American realism; Synchromism

Thomas Hart Benton (April 15, 1889 – January 19, 1975) was an American painter, muralist, and printmaker. Along with Grant Wood and John Steuart Curry, he was at the forefront of the Regionalist art movement. The fluid, sculpted figures in his paintings showed everyday people in scenes of life in the United States.

His work is strongly associated with the Midwestern United States, the region in which he was born and which he called home for most of his life. He also studied in Paris, lived in New York City for more than 20 years and painted scores of works there, summered for 50 years on Martha's Vineyard off the New England coast, and also painted scenes of the American South and West.

== Early life and education ==
Benton was born in Neosho, Missouri, into an influential family of politicians. He had two younger sisters, Mary and Mildred, and a younger brother, Nathaniel. His mother was Elizabeth Wise Benton and his father, Colonel Maecenas Benton, was a lawyer and four times elected as U.S. congressman. Known as the "little giant of the Ozarks", Maecenas named his son after his own granduncle, Thomas Hart Benton, one of the first two United States Senators elected from Missouri.

Given his father's political career, Benton spent his childhood shuttling between Washington, D.C., and Missouri. His father sent him to Western Military Academy in 1905–06, hoping to shape him for a political career. Growing up in two different cultures, Benton rebelled against his father's plans. He wanted to develop his interest in art, which his mother supported. As a teenager, he worked as a cartoonist for the Joplin American newspaper, in Joplin, Missouri.

With his mother's encouragement, in 1907 Benton enrolled at The School of The Art Institute of Chicago. Two years later, he moved to Paris in 1909 to continue his art education at the Académie Julian. His mother supported him financially and emotionally to work at art until he married in his early 30s. His sister Mildred said, "My mother was a great power in his growing up."

In Paris, Benton met other North American artists, such as the Mexican Diego Rivera and Stanton Macdonald-Wright, an advocate of Synchromism. Influenced by the latter, Benton subsequently adopted a Synchromist style.

== Early career and World War I ==
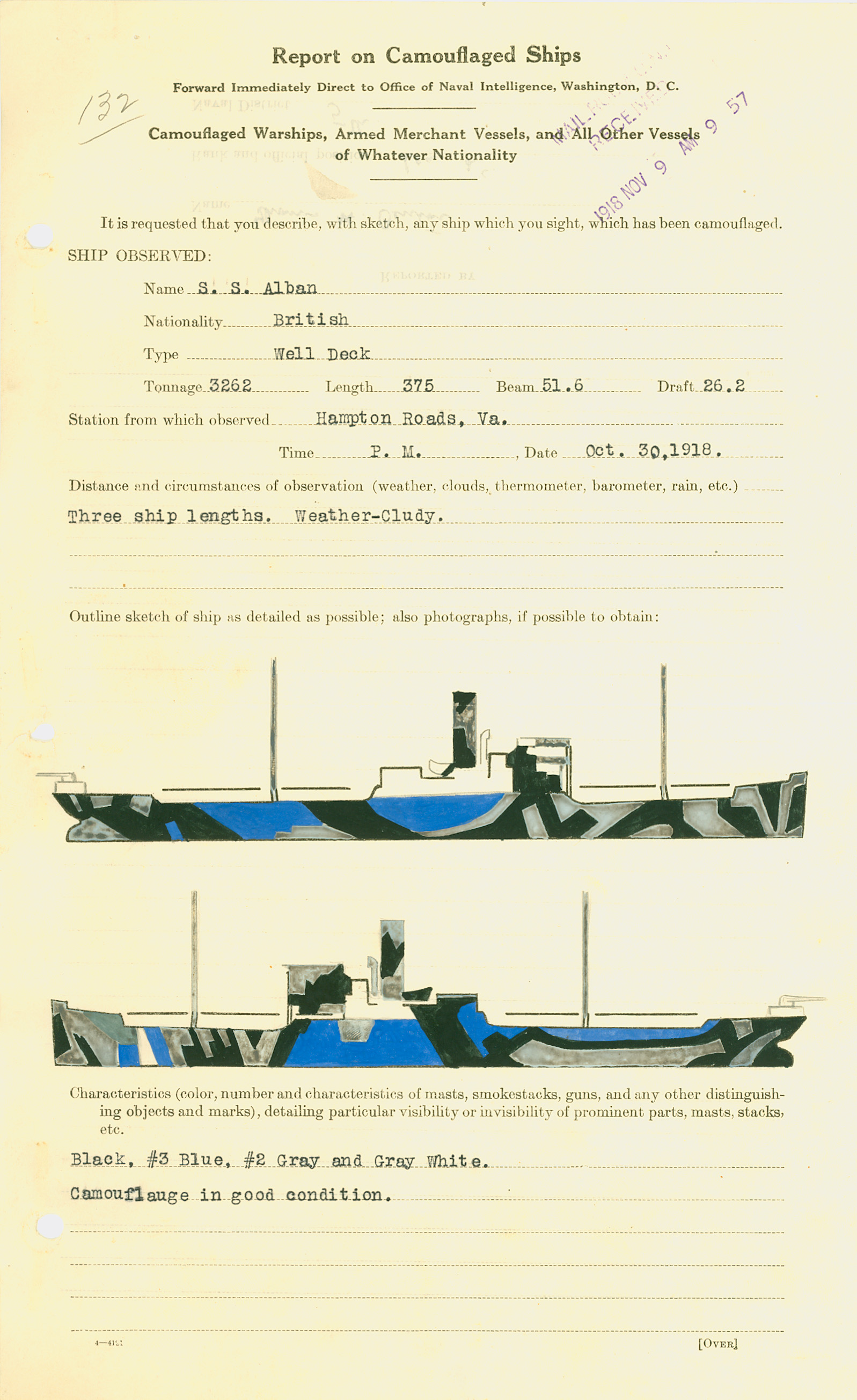
Camouflage pattern of the British ship S.S. Alban as documented by Thomas Hart Benton

After studying in Europe, Benton moved to New York City in 1912 and resumed painting. During World War I, he served in the U.S. Navy and was stationed at Norfolk, Virginia. His war-related work had an enduring effect on his style. He was directed to make drawings and illustrations of shipyard work and life, and this requirement for realistic documentation strongly affected his later style. Later in the war, classified as a "camoufleur", Benton drew the camouflaged ships that entered Norfolk harbor.

His work was required for several reasons: to ensure that U.S. ship painters were correctly applying the camouflage schemes, to aid in identifying U.S. ships that might later be lost, and to have records of the ship camouflage of other Allied navies. Benton later said that his work for the Navy "was the most important thing, so far, I had ever done for myself as an artist."

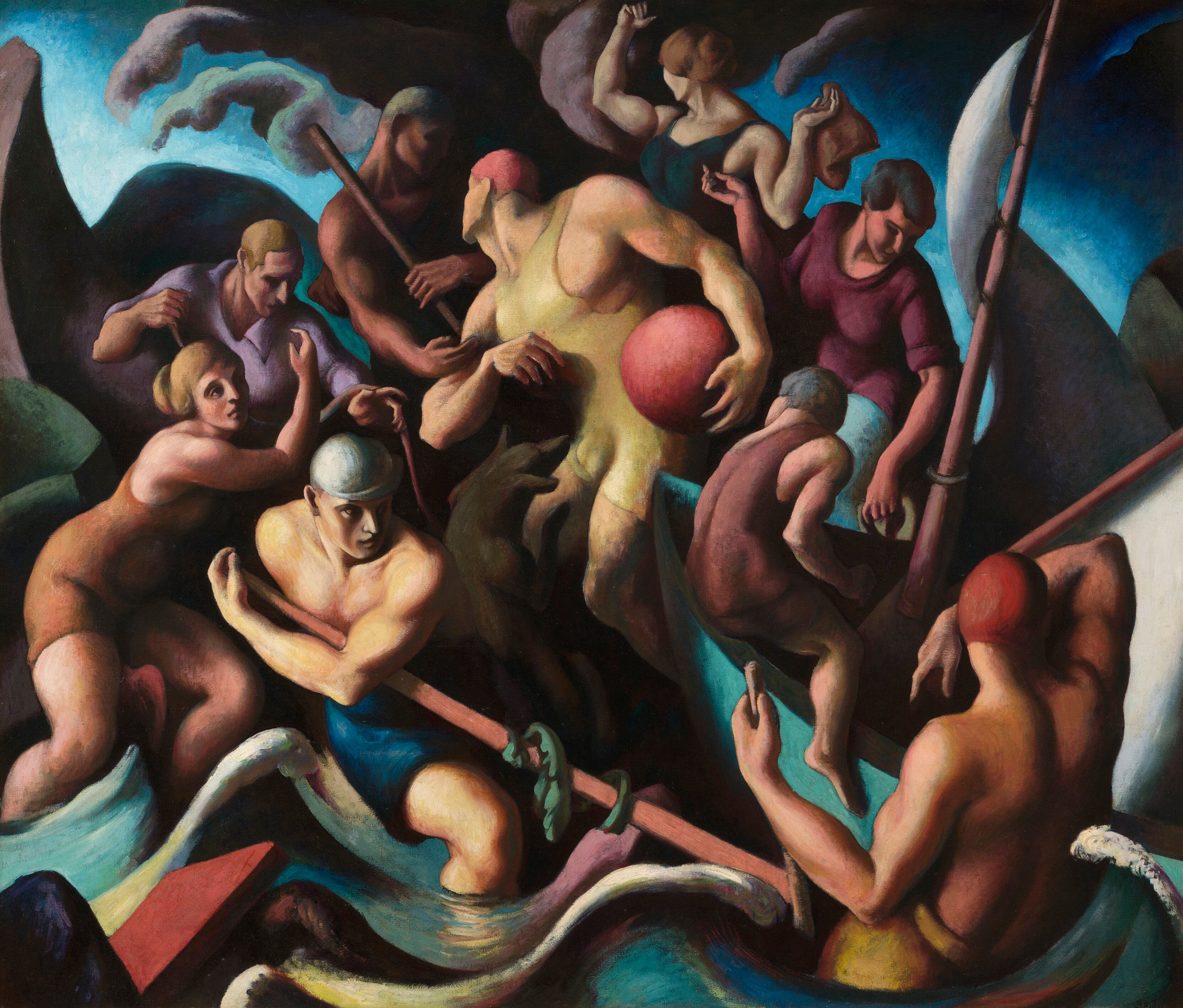
People of Chilmark (Figure Composition), 1920, in the Hirshhorn Museum collection in Washington, D.C.

== Marriage and family ==
At the age of 33, Benton married Rita Piacenza, an Italian immigrant, in 1922. They met while Benton was teaching art classes for a neighborhood organization in New York City, where she was one of his students. They were married for almost 53 years until Benton's death in 1975; Rita died eleven weeks after her husband. The couple had a son, Thomas Piacenza Benton (1926–2010), and a daughter, Jessie Benton (July 10, 1939 - February 2023), who became a major figure in the Fort Hill Community founded by Mel Lyman; Benton himself was identified as a "benefactor" to the community, giving them "dozens of paintings".

== Later career ==
=== Dedication to Regionalism ===
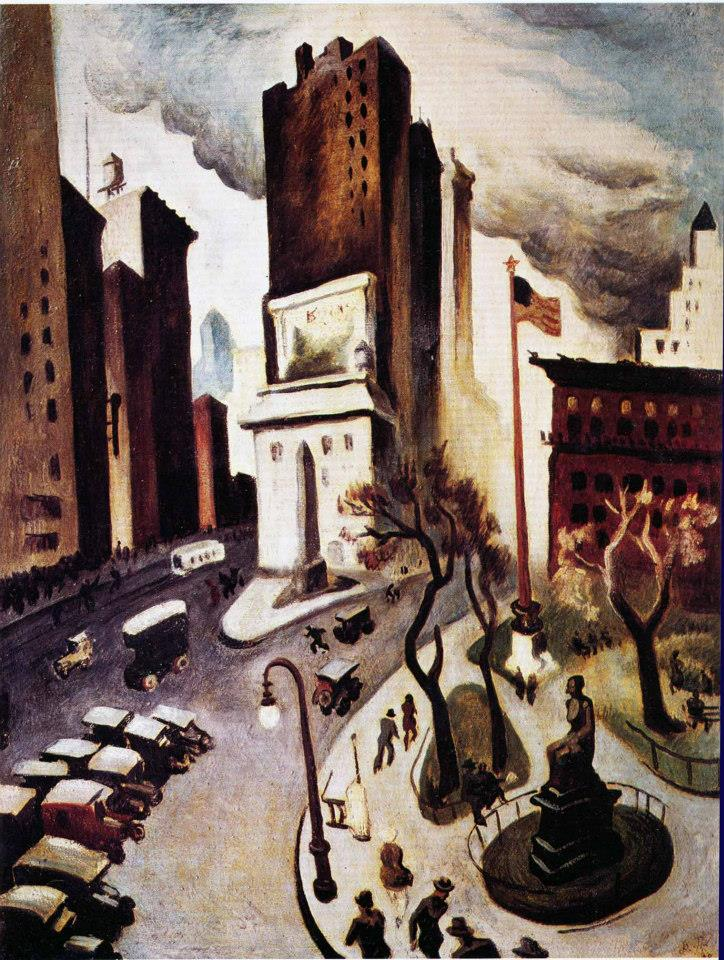
In 1924, Benton depicted three landmarks in New York City's Madison Square within his painting New York, Early Twenties.

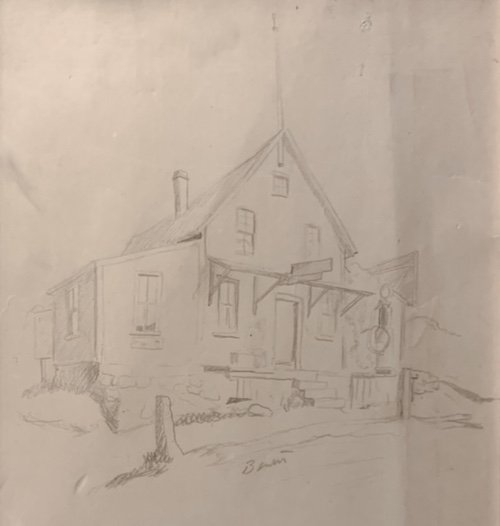
General Store (1922) drawing by Thomas Hart Benton, created during his 1920s tour of America

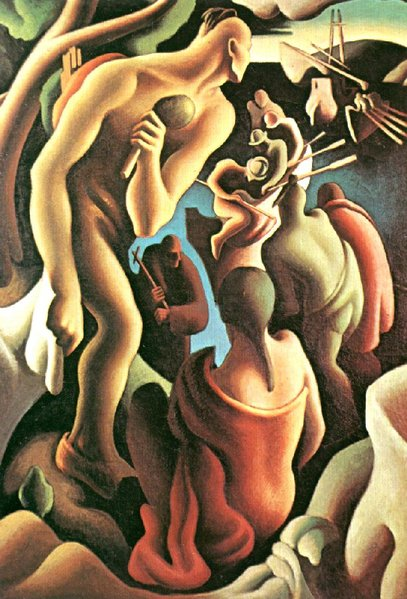
American Discovery Viewed by Native Americans (1922), Salem, Peabody Essex Museum.

On his return to New York in the early 1920s, Benton declared himself an "enemy of modernism"; he began the naturalistic and representational work known as Regionalism. He toured America, making sketches and ink wash drawings of the things he saw. He would go back to these sketches again and again as reference for future paintings. He expanded the scale of his Regionalist works, culminating in his America Today murals at the New School for Social Research in 1930–31. In 1984, the murals were purchased and restored by AXA Equitable to hang in the lobby of the AXA Equitable Tower at 1290 Sixth Avenue in New York City. In December 2012, AXA donated the murals to the Metropolitan Museum of Art. The Met's exhibition "Thomas Hart Benton's 'America Today' Mural Rediscovered" ran until April 19, 2015. The murals were described as showing how Benton absorbed and used the influence of the Greek artist El Greco.

Benton broke through to the mainstream in 1932. A relative unknown, he won a commission to paint the murals of Indiana life planned by the state in the 1933 Century of Progress Exhibition in Chicago. The Indiana Murals stirred controversy; Benton painted everyday people, and included a portrayal of events in the state's history which some people did not want publicized. Some critics attacked his work for showing members of the Indiana Ku Klux Klan (KKK) in full regalia. The KKK reached its peak membership in 1925. In Indiana, 30% of adult males were estimated to be members of the Klan, and in 1924 it helped elect Edward L. Jackson as governor; Jackson helped the Klan but was not himself a member.

These mural panels are now displayed at Indiana University in Bloomington, with the majority hung in the "Hall of Murals" at the Indiana University Auditorium. Four additional panels are displayed in the former University Theatre (now the Indiana University Cinema) connected to the Auditorium. Two panels, including the one with images of the KKK, are located in a lecture classroom at Woodburn Hall.

In 1932, Benton also painted The Arts of Life in America, a set of large murals for an early site of the Whitney Museum of American Art. Major panels include Arts of the City, Arts of the West, Arts of the South and Indian Arts. In 1953 five of the panels were purchased by the New Britain Museum of American Art in Connecticut, and have since been displayed there.

On December 24, 1934, Benton was featured on one of the earliest color covers of Time magazine. Benton's work was featured along with that of fellow Midwesterners Grant Wood and John Steuart Curry in an article entitled "The U.S. Scene". The trio were featured as the new heroes of American art, and Regionalism was described as a significant art movement.

In 1935, after he had "alienated both the left-leaning community of artists with his disregard for politics and the larger New York-Paris art world with what was considered his folksy style", Benton left the artistic debates of New York for his native Missouri. He was commissioned to create a mural for the Missouri State Capitol in Jefferson City. A Social History of Missouri is perhaps Benton's greatest work. In an interview in 1973, he said, "If I have any right to make judgments, I would say that the Missouri mural was my best work". As with his earlier work, controversy arose over his portrayal of the state's history, as he included the subjects of slavery in the history of Missouri, the Missouri outlaw Jesse James, and the political boss Tom Pendergast. With his return to Missouri, Benton embraced the Regionalist art movement.

He settled in Kansas City and accepted a teaching job at the Kansas City Art Institute. This base afforded Benton greater access to rural America, which was changing rapidly. Due to his Populist political upbringing, Benton's sympathy was with the working class and the small farmer, unable to gain material advantage despite the Industrial Revolution.

During the late 1930s he created some of his best-known work, including the allegorical nude Persephone. It was considered scandalous by the Kansas City Art Institute, and was borrowed by the showman Billy Rose, who hung it in his New York nightclub, the Diamond Horseshoe. It is now held by the Nelson-Atkins Museum of Art in Kansas City. Karal Ann Marling, an art historian, says it is "one of the great works of American pornography."

In 1937, Benton published his autobiography An Artist in America, which was critically acclaimed. The writer Sinclair Lewis said of it: "Here's a rare thing, a painter who can write." During this period Benton also began to produce signed, limited-edition lithographs, which were sold at $5.00 each through the Associated American Artists Galleries based in New York. From 1929 – 1974 he would produce 92 lithographs in total, in edition sizes ranging from 2-500.

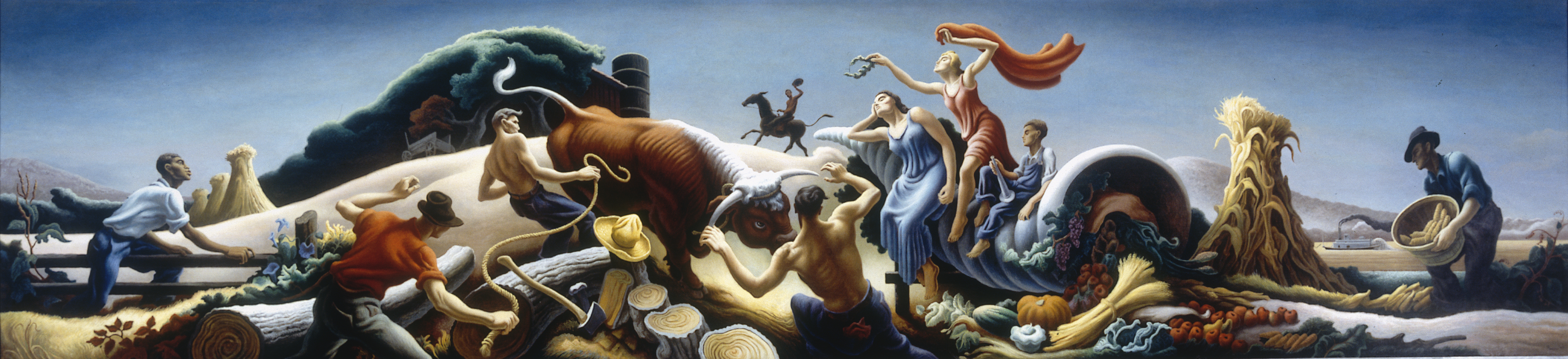
Achelous and Hercules, a 1947 mural made for a Kansas City department store, now in the Smithsonian American Art Museum

=== Teaching career ===
Benton's autobiography indicates that his son was enrolled from age 3 to 9 at the City and Country School in New York in exchange for his teaching art there. He included the school's founder, Caroline Pratt, in "City Activities with Dance Hall", one of the ten panels in America Today.

Benton taught at the Art Students League of New York from 1926 to 1935 and at the Kansas City Art Institute from 1935 to 1941. His most famous student, Jackson Pollock, whom he mentored in the Art Students League, founded the Abstract Expressionist movement. Pollock often said that Benton's traditional teachings gave him something to rebel against. With another of his students, Glen Rounds, who went on to become a prolific author and illustrator of children's books, Benton spent a summer touring the Western United States in the early 1930s. In the 1930s Benton taught at the Ste. Genevieve Art Colony in Ste. Genevieve, Missouri.

Benton's students in New York and Kansas City included many painters who contributed significantly to American art. They included Pollock's brother Charles Pollock, Eric Bransby, Charles Banks Wilson, Frederic James, Lamar Dodd, Reginald Marsh, Charles Green Shaw, Margot Peet, Jackson Lee Nesbitt, Roger Medearis, James Duard Marshall, Glenn Gant, Fuller Potter, William Fredrick Kautzman, Aaron Gunn Pyle, and Delmer J. Yoakum. Benton also briefly taught Dennis Hopper at the Kansas City Art Institute; Hopper later became well known as an independent actor, filmmaker, and photographer.

== Later life ==
In 1944, Benton appeared in an episode of John Nesbit's Passing Parade titled “Grandpa Called It Art,” that showed several contemporary artists at work. Benton demonstrated his process for the camera, from obtaining a farmer's permission to sketch his farm through making a three-dimensional model of the scene to the final painting.

During World War II, Benton created a series titled The Year of Peril, which portrayed the threat to American ideals by fascism and Nazism. The prints were widely distributed. Following the war, Regionalism fell from favor, eclipsed by the rise of Abstract Expressionism. Benton remained active for another 30 years, but his work included less contemporary social commentary and portrayed pre-industrial farmlands.

Again by Thomas Benton (ca. 1941), Washington, D.C., National Archives and Records Administration.

Benton was hired in 1940, along with eight other prominent American artists, to document dramatic scenes and characters during the production of the film The Long Voyage Home, a cinematic adaptation of Eugene O'Neill's plays. Benton was also an accomplished harmonica musician, recording an album for Decca Records in 1942 titled Saturday Night at Tom Benton's.

He continued to paint murals, including Lincoln (1953), for Lincoln University in Jefferson City, Missouri; Trading At Westport Landing (1956), for The River Club in Kansas City; Father Hennepin at Niagara Falls (1961) for the Power Authority of the State of New York; Joplin at the Turn of the Century (1972) in Joplin; and Independence and the Opening of the West, for the Harry S. Truman Library in Independence. His commission for the Truman Library mural led to his developing a friendship with Harry S. Truman that lasted until the former U.S. President's death.

Benton died in 1975 at work in his studio, as he completed his final mural, The Sources of Country Music, for the Country Music Hall of Fame in Nashville, Tennessee.

== Legacy and honors ==
Benton was elected into the National Academy of Design in 1954 as an Associate member and became a full member in 1956. In 1961, Benton was chosen as one of 50 outstanding Americans of meritorious performance in the fields of endeavor, to be honored as a Guest of Honor to the first annual Banquet of the Golden Plate in Monterey, California. Honor was awarded by vote of the National Panel of Distinguished Americans of the Academy of Achievement.

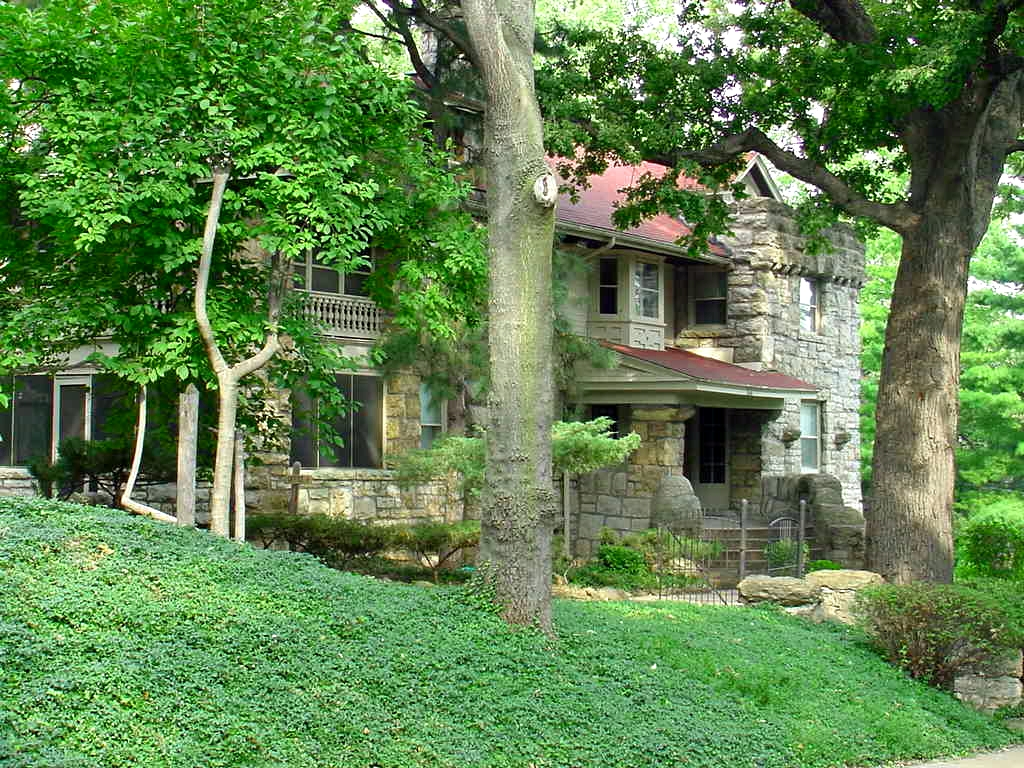
Exterior of the Thomas Hart Benton Home and Studio State Historic Site

In 1977, Benton's 2 1/2 story late-Victorian residence and carriage house studio in Kansas City was designated by Missouri as the Thomas Hart Benton Home and Studio State Historic Site. The historic site has been preserved nearly unchanged from the time of his death; clothing, furniture, and paint brushes are still in place. Displaying 13 original works of his art, the house museum is open for guided tours. Benton was the subject of the eponymous 1988 documentary, Thomas Hart Benton, directed by Ken Burns and produced by WGBH-TV.

In December 2019, a lawsuit was filed by Benton's daughter, Jessie, her son, and her two daughters against the UMB Bank, a trustee of the Benton Trusts and manager of Benton's estate since 1979: "More than a hundred paintings gone, priceless works of art stored in subpar conditions, paintings sold for fire sale prices – those are the allegations put forward by a new lawsuit filed by the heirs of famous American artist Thomas Hart Benton." The bank did not directly respond to the specific allegations in the lawsuit but characterized them as misguided. The bank's president, Jim Rine, said that it regrets that the Bentons chose to resolve the issue through litigation and that the bank takes its role as trustee of Benton's art very seriously.

== Books ==
=== Written ===
- Benton, Thomas Hart (1951), An Artist in America, University of Kansas City Press
- Benton, Thomas Hart (1969), An American in Art: A Professional and Technical Autobiography, University Press of Kansas

=== Illustrated ===
- Europe After 8:15 – H.L. Mencken—1914
- Schoolhouse in the Foothills – Ella Enslow—1937
- Tom Sawyer – Mark Twain—1939
- Grapes of Wrath – John Steinbeck—1940
- Huckleberry Finn – Mark Twain—1941
- Taps for Private Tussie – Jesse Stuart—1943
- Benjamin Franklin's Autobiography & Other Tales—1944
- Life on the Mississippi – Mark Twain—1944
- The Oregon Trail – Francis Parkman—1945
- Ozark Folksongs (4 Vols.) – Vance Randolph (endpapers only)–1946-50
- We the People – Leo Huberman—1947
- Green Grow the Lilacs – Lynn Riggs—1954
- Three Rivers South (Young Abe Lincoln) – Virginia Eifert–1955
