= Joplin at the Turn of the Century =

Mural by Thomas Hart Benton in Joplin, Missouri

- Artist: Thomas Hart Benton
- Year: 1972
- Dimensions: 1.7 m × 4.3 m (5.5 ft × 14 ft)
- Location: City Hall; Joplin, Missouri

Joplin at the Turn of the Century is a 1972 mural by the American painter Thomas Hart Benton. It depicts people from different social spheres on the Main Street of Joplin, Missouri at the turn of the century. The painting is 14 feet wide and 5 1/2 foot high. It is located at Joplin City Hall (602 S. Main St.)

The mural was commissioned for the city's centennial. Benton was chosen because he began his career in the city as a newspaper cartoonist in 1906. Eleven years earlier, he had sworn to never paint another mural, but changed his mind when the city council contacted him. The payment was 60,000 dollars.

Benton's work was documented in the film Thomas Hart Benton: The Last Mural by Bob Phillips, a newsman for KODE-TV. The film premiered in connection with the unveiling of the mural in March 1973. The tapes for the film were rediscovered in 2010, and the film was aired on KODE-TV on July 10, 2010.

In 2005 the painting was relocated from the Joplin government building on Third St. to the new City Hall at 602 Main St.
