= Felicitas Apodaca =

American activist (1912–1997)

Felicitas Córdova Apodaca (March 6, 1912 – December 26, 1997) was an American women's and children's advocate and community activist. She became involved with the Community Service Organization (CSO) in El Monte, California.

== Biography ==
Apodaca was born in Manuel Doblado outside of Guanajuato, Mexico. Her father worked at the ASARCO smelter outside of El Paso, Texas and the family lived in the smelter's housing for workers. Apodaca's mother, Irene Santos Cordova, was a midwife who crossed from El Paso into Mexico to help deliver babies, even during the Mexican Revolution. Apodaca attended El Paso High School, but never graduated and in 1937, married her husband, Juan Apodaca.

She worked as a housewife for thirteen years, during which time she joined Planned Parenthood and was in publicity photographs with her son, Juan, for the organization in 1940. Later, she moved from Texas to El Monte, California, where she joined the Community Service Organization (CSO). Apodaca organized fund-raisers, various activities for young people of all ages and set up a food pantry. Apodaca also became involved in providing paralegal information for Mexican immigrants to the United States.
