= J. S. Matthews =

Canadian archivist

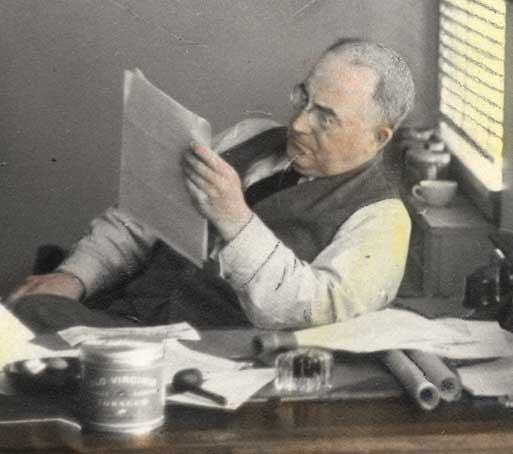
- Born: 7 September 1878; Wales, UK
- Died: 1 October 1970 (aged 92); Vancouver, British Columbia, Canada
- Occupations: Archivist, historian
- Known for: Vancouver's First Archivist

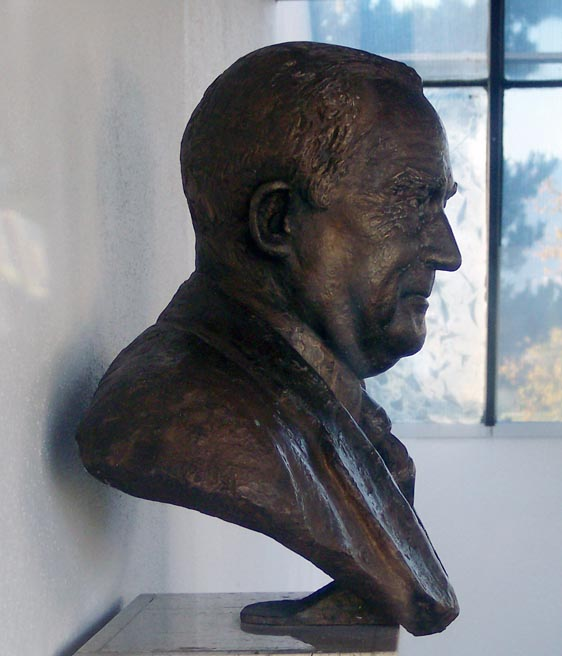
Bust of Major Matthews in the building named after him and home of the City of Vancouver Archives, nestled in Vancouver's Vanier Park. Sculpted by Elek Imredy

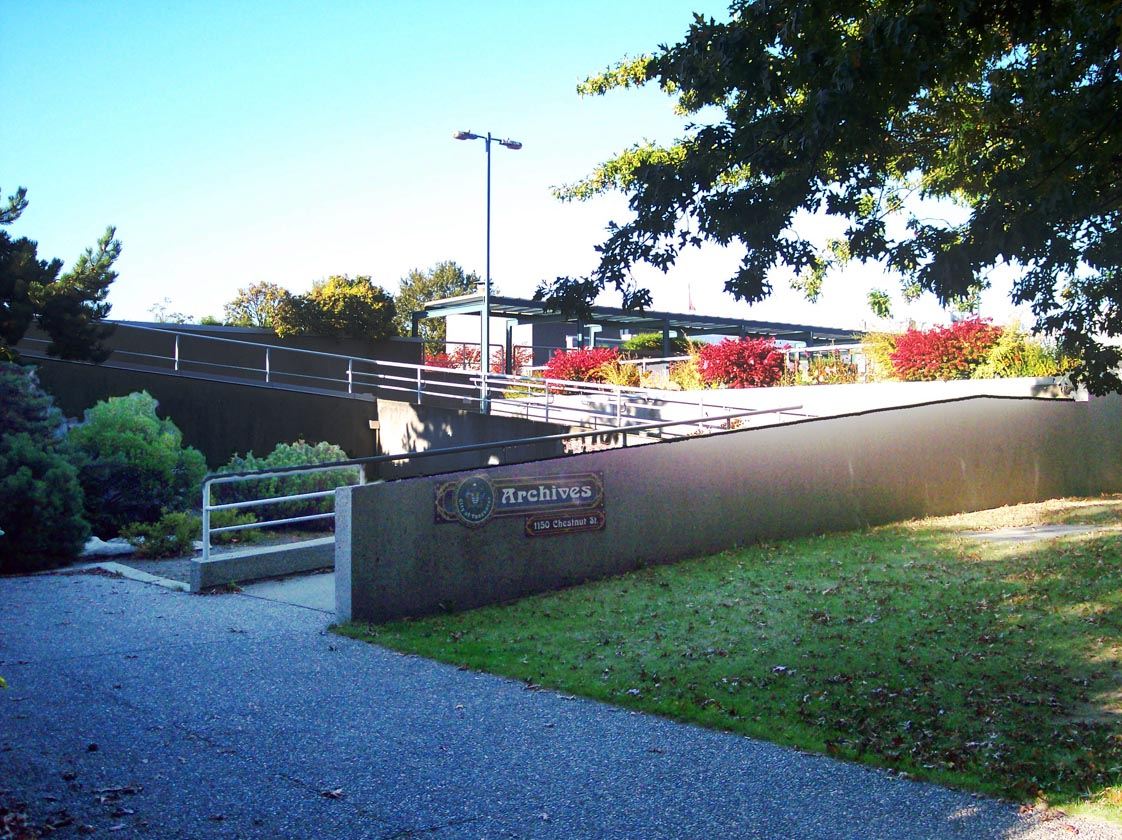
City of Vancouver Archives

Major James Skitt Matthews (7 September 1878 – 1 October 1970) was the City of Vancouver's first archivist and an early historian and chronicler of the city. Major Matthews also refers to a building named in his honour in Vanier Park, Vancouver, British Columbia.

Born in Wales, Matthews lived for a time in New Zealand before settling in Vancouver in 1898. He was an officer with the Duke of Connaught’s Own Rifles Sixth Regiment, a Freemason, and was named Kitsilano "Citizen of the Year" in 1959.

== Collecting ==
For decades he collected and catalogued artifacts, solicited donations, interviewed early inhabitants of the young city, and wrote historical narratives. In total, Matthews compiled 40 publications related to Vancouver's history.

The archives began in Major Matthews' home until he was eventually given space by the City in various locations and was officially made the City's archivist in 1933. He moved the collection back into several homes for a period following a dispute with Mayor Gerry McGeer over ownership of the collection. The archives did not find a permanent home in his lifetime, but were given to the city with the condition of a dedicated building in his will within one year after his death in 1970.

== Legacy ==
His efforts and legacy have been memorialized in the Major Matthews Building, home of the City of Vancouver Archives. When the building was opened in 1972, it was the first in Canada built specifically as a city archive.

The archives building, located at 1150 Chestnut Street, is a semi-underground modern structure in Vanier Park, designed by Bill Leithead.

The City of Vancouver Archives serves the repository for historical records generated by the City of Vancouver, including the Mayor's Office, the Parks Board, the Board of Police Commissioners, the Vancouver Police Department, and the Office of the City Clerk. It also contains numerous collections from private donors, businesses, and community groups. The archives are part of the City Clerk's Department.

During the 1930s Matthews undertook to publish a collection of reminiscences and photographs under the title Early Vancouver. The publication was planned in seven volumes but only two reached print before city council intervened to prevent further un-mandated expenditure on book-publishing. Copies of Vol. I and II are in circulation and turn up in rare books and antiquarian shops and websites. The other five volumes are preserved in manuscript form at the City Archives.

== See also ==
- Apodaca Provincial Park
