= Artists' File Initiative =

Archive in Kansas City, Missouri, US

Artists' File Initiative (AFI)
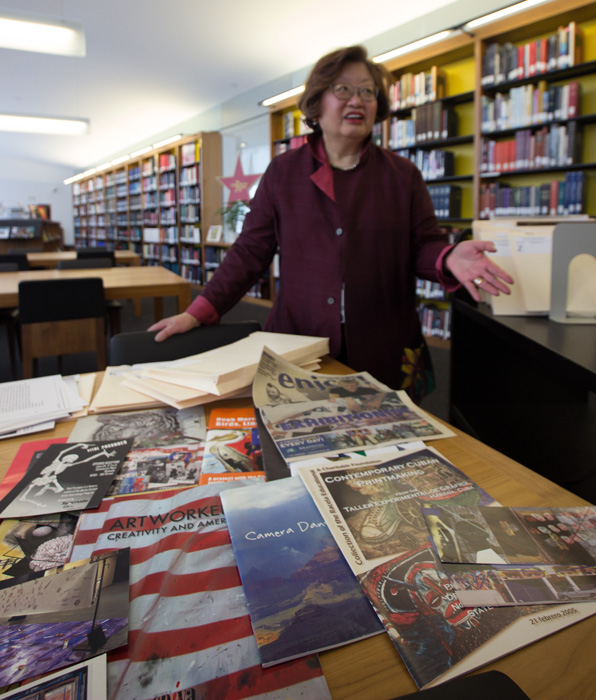
- Marilyn Carbonell in the Reading Room of The Spencer Art Reference Library discusses the contents of an artists' file
- Type: Ongoing project
- Established: 2015
- Affiliations: Nelson-Atkins Museum of Art; The Spencer Art Reference Library; Kansas City Artists Coalition
- Location: Kansas City, Missouri, United States
- Website: nelson-atkins.org/library/

The Artists' File Initiative (AFI) is an archival project established in 2015 and located in The Spencer Art Reference Library at the Nelson-Atkins Museum of Art.

The mission of AFI is to create archival files documenting the careers of the creative community of Kansas City, Missouri. In pursuit of this mission, the Artists' File Initiative takes an active role in collaborating with artists to create in-depth archival files documenting their artistic career. The project helps local artists preserve their legacy, as well as provides access to researchers who request information on local artists. The files are a resource that is used by scholars, artists, curators and anyone interested in learning more about the arts community in this region.

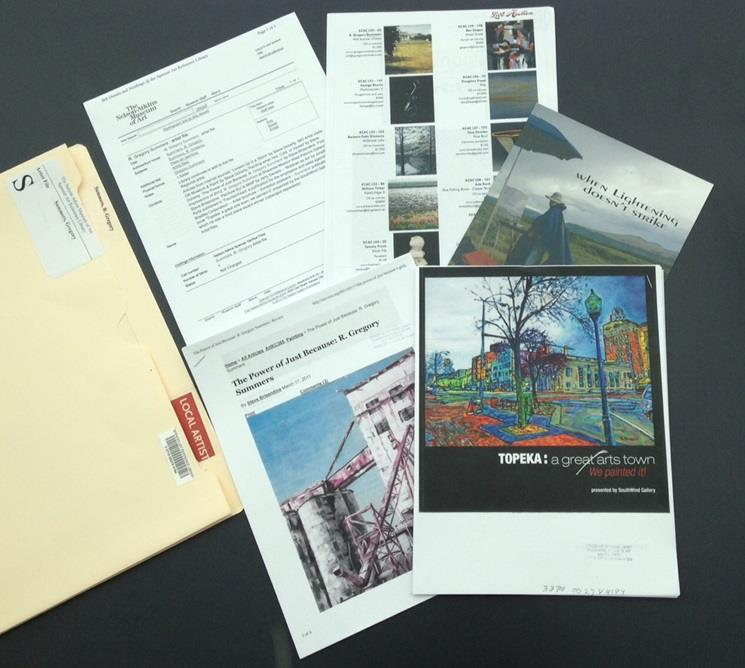
An example of the contents in an artists' file (file from Gregory Summers

== Contents ==
For a file to be considered complete, it must contain an Artist's statement, a résumé, a gallery or museum exhibition announcement, published reviews, annotated exhibition checklists, annotated exhibition gallery shots, as well as any other additional supporting material.

== Participants ==
=== A ===
- Adelman, Maryanna
- Alfie, Marie
- Anderson, Barry
- Angilan, Ione

=== B ===
- Baer, Joy
- Bennett, Philomene
- Benson, Lynn
- Benton, Thomas Hart
- Berman, Laura
- Blitt, Rita
- Bonds, NedRa
- Booth, Jane
- Bransby, Eric
- Briendenthal, Derrick
- Bricker-Pugh, Jennifer
- Burk, James Jeffrey
- Bussell, Joe

=== C ===
- Cannon, Mary
- Carstenson, Cecil
- Clews, Rebecca
- Cobler, Jeanine
- Conry, Maura
- Coonrod, Mary Ann
- Corbin, Tom
- Copt, Louis J.
- Cusumano Miller, Karen

=== D ===
- Dirks, Teresa
- Dougherty, Aaron

=== E ===
- Eigles, Lorrie
- Eldred, Dale
- Erickson, William W

=== F ===
- Faus, Jose
- Ferguson, Ken
- Flynn, Genevieve E
- Ford, David
- Freed, Douglass
- French, Diallo Javonne
- Fuhrman, Andrea

=== G ===
- Gilluly, John
- Goldman, Lester
- Gordon, Shea
- Goslin, Charles
- Gottschall, Bret
- Gowin, Elijah
- Grossman, Lisa
- Guile, Rita
- Gutowski, John

=== H ===
- Harryman, Shirley
- Henk, Diane
- High, Anthony
- Hoelzel, Elise
- Honig, Peregrine
- Howard, Jean
- Hughes, Holly
- Hunter-Putsch, Sharon

=== I ===
- Ira, George
- Irwin, Nina

=== J ===
- James, Frederic
- Jennings, Angie

=== K ===
- Koch, Ada
- Kraft, Arthur
- Kren, Margo
- Kuemmerlein, Janet

=== L ===
- Laser, Sid
- Leedy, Jim
- Leffel, Paula
- Leffel, Russel C.
- Leitch, Christopher
- Lighton, Gertrude Woolf
- Lighton, Linda
- Lyon, Mike

=== M ===
- MacMorris, Daniel
- McAnany, Larry
- Madera, Edna
- Majo
- Marak, Lou
- Merrill, Hugh
- Miller Gross, Marcie
- Morrow, David A. Sr.

=== N ===
- Nichols, Robyn
- Niewald, Wilbur

=== O ===
- Ochs, John
- Ortiz, Chris
- Osa, Doug
- Othic, Nora

=== P ===
- Parker, Jennifer R
- Peet, Margo
- Pronko, Jane

=== Q ===
- Quackenbush, Robert J

=== R ===
- Revenaugh, Katrina
- Richerson, Modesta
- Rivera, Miguel
- Rodriquez, Sharon M.

=== S ===
- Sajovic, Jim
- Scapellati, Al
- Schliefke, Michael
- Shikles, Anita
- Slowinski, Ron
- Smith, Nelson
- Steen, Karen
- Stewart, Bridget
- Summers, R. Gregory
- Szasz, Frank

=== T ===
- Tanner, Jay R.
- Templeton, Robert
- Thomas, Larry
- Tibbetts, John C.
- Titterington, David
- Toh, Heinrich
- Toombs, Michael
- Torres, Barnadette Esperanza
- Trease, Fred
- Triplett, Lori Lee
- Trotter, Vickie

=== V ===
- VanHoozer, Robin
- Velasco, Maria
- Vesce, Catherine
- Vogel-Hyde, Anita
- Voorhees, Jane

=== W ===
- Watne, Davin
- Weissenbach, Rashelle
- Werts, Diana
- Wheeler, Terri
- Wieser, Clifford P.
- Wilimovsky, Charles
- Williams, Debbie Scott
- Wyeth, Megan

=== Y ===
- Yaworski, Alex F.
- Yaworski, Don

=== Z ===
- Zastoupil, Carol

== Contributors ==
Before the beginning of this project, Marilyn Carbonell, head of Library Services, spoke with gallerists, artists, the museum's director, trustees, and the Nelson-Atkins Museum Business Council. Todd Weiner, of Todd Weiner Gallery in Crossroads, Kansas City, has worked as an artist liaison on this project, and assists Carbonell in connecting with artists wishing to participate by depositing material in the artists' files. Janet Simpson, Executive Director of the Kansas City Artists Coalition, also plays an active role in AFI by encouraging artists to archive and letting artists know about AFI. The files themselves are co-curated with an art librarian and the contributing artist.

== Process ==
The process of creating the files begins with library staff reaching out to museum leaders, curators, library staff, commercial galleries and artists organizations to identify prominent local artists. From there, Carbonell creates what she calls a "decision matrix," and logs each artists' accomplishments such as their completion of art school, their exhibitions and recommendations from various organizations. From there, she contacts the artists directly to create a comprehensive file of their work. The system for the cataloging criteria is called the Artist Files Revealed through the Art Libraries Society of North America.

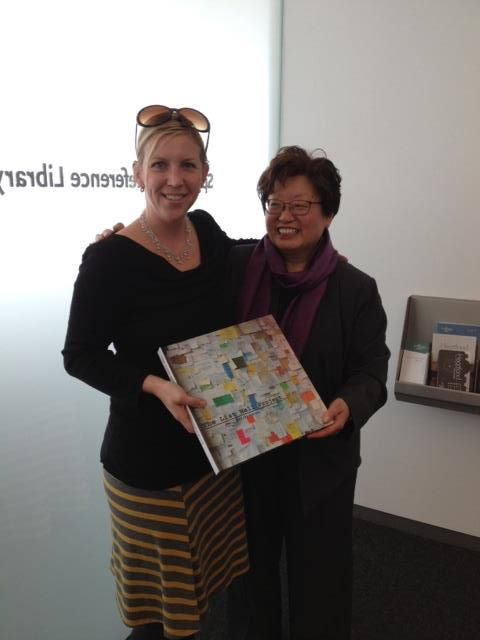
Marilyn Carbonell with Lisa Lala, presenting her gift of her book to The Spencer Art Reference Library. Her gift helps further research on local Kansas City artists.

== Developments ==
=== 2014 ===
- Discussions with artists and others
- Researched the environment
- Seeking ideas, partners, project design
- Tested the concept

=== 2015 ===
- Official launch of the Artists' File Initiative

=== 2016 ===
- Feature article in Kansas City Studio Magazine's March/April 2016 issue
- National blog feature in the February 2016 issue of Archiving Artists, an IMLS-sponsored project by the University of North Carolina

=== 2017 ===
- Hosted Edit-a thon workshop at the Spencer Art Reference Library for local African American artists working in Kansas City, Missouri.
- Held exhibition in the Spencer Art Reference Library consisting of 4 participants in the Artist File Initiative titled Natural Inspirations: Kansas City's Artists Inspired by Nature
- Almost 100 co-curated files established with the individual artists
- All forms of media represented
- Each file is fully described in Worldcat.org and the Nelson-Atkins Libraryonesearch.org - discoverable through the web and accessible for consultation in the Spencer Art Reference Library
- The Artists File Initiative was mentioned in a KCUR-FM article written by Laura Spencer regarding Arthur Kraft, published online May 2, 2017.

=== 2018-2025 ===
- Library staff and volunteers continue to manage and grow the Artists' File Initiative.
