= Toombs =

Toombs is a surname. Notable people with the name include:

- Ariel Teal Toombs (born 1985), American actress and professional wrestler
- Kenneth Toombs (1928–2008), 20th-century American academic librarian
- Leota Toombs (1925–1991), American artist and Disney imagineer
- Maree Toombs, Australian mental health researcher
- Michael Toombs (born 1955), American artist
- Robert Toombs (1810–1885), U.S. Senator, first Secretary of State of the Confederacy and Confederate general
- Roderick Toombs, better known as Roddy Piper (1954–2015), Canadian professional wrestler and actor
- Rudy Toombs (c. 1914–1962), American songwriter
- Sam Toombs (1871–1949), Australian politician

== See also ==
- Toombs County, Georgia
