= Nedra Bonds =

American artist (born 1948)

NedRa Bonds
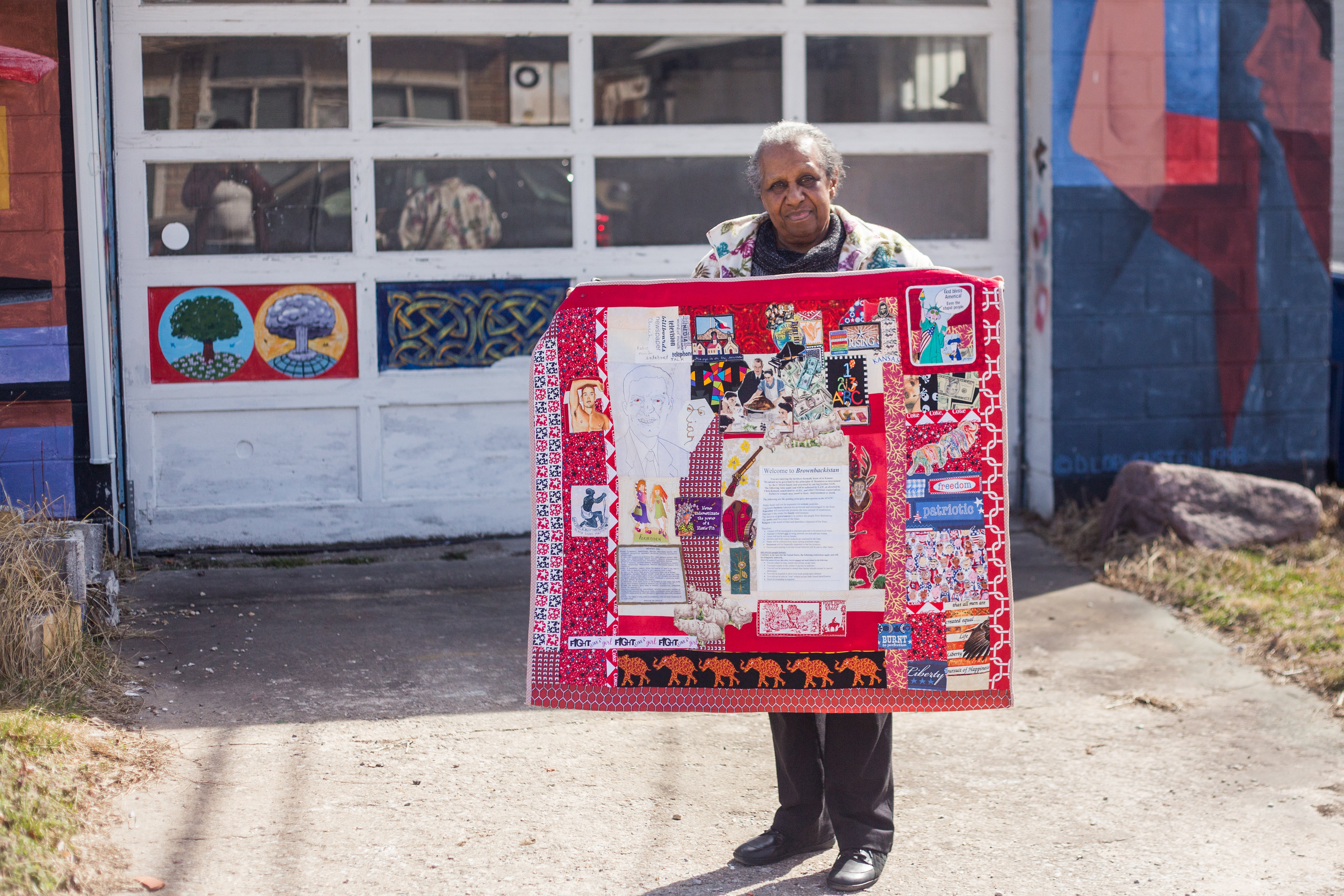
- Born: 1948 (age 77–78); Kansas City, Kansas, U.S.
- Education: University of Kansas, Kansas State University
- Known for: Quilting, activism
- Notable work: Quindaro Quilt, If Da Dirt Could Talk, The Finger and The Fist, A Kiss From The Ancestors
- Awards: Delegate at the Earth Summit Conference of the United Nations, Kansas Arts Commission, Charlotte Street Foundation Rocket Grant Recipient, Arts Council of Metropolitan Kansas City's Inspiration Grant Recipient

Nedra "NedRa" Bonds (born 1948) is an American quilter, activist, and retired teacher, born and raised in the historic Quindaro neighborhood in Kansas City, Kansas. Bonds creates quilts and mixed media fiber dolls using fabric, beads, and symbolism to explore issues dealing with human rights, race, women, politics, and the environment. She is best known for her Quindaro Quilt, a quilt measuring 4 by 6 feet, detailing the important history of the Quindaro neighborhood and its role as part of the National Underground Railroad System of Historic Trails. As a community activist and educator, Bonds advocates for legislation, taught workshops locally and internationally, and attended the Earth Summit Conference on Environment and Development of the United Nations as a delegate in Rio de Janeiro, Brazil, in 1992. Bonds is a practicing artist and retired teacher in Kansas City, Kansas. Her recent projects include her Common Threads quilt, commissioned by the Kansas City Chiefs for their Arrowhead Arts Collection, the Wak’ó Mujeres Phụ nữ Women Mural collaboration, sponsored by the Charlotte Street Foundation's Rocket Grant Program, in Lawrence, Kansas, and her recent cancer project. Bonds was appointed to the Kansas Arts Commission by Kansas Governor Joan Finney in 1992.

== Early life and education ==
Bonds was born in the historic Quindaro neighborhood in Kansas City, Kansas to a family of quilters. Both her mother, Georgia Elizabeth Patton (née Goff), and her paternal grandmother, Juanita Patton, were quilters. Her father, William Patton, worked as a police captain. Bonds was taught quilting at the age of six, saying "So I learned to make 10 stitches to the first joint in my finger, and if I didn’t do 10 then I had to take them out and do them over again." She continues to pass these skills on to her two granddaughters. Bonds entered school in 1954, the year of Brown v. Board of Education, recalling "I spent the first three years in segregated schools. Then I was integrated into a school where all the teachers were white, and the subject matter had nothing to do with me." Bonds did not realize until later in life that entering school in the midst of the Civil Rights Movement helped shape her as an artist and an activist.

Bonds received her Bachelor of Arts at the University of Kansas in American Studies and her Master of Science at Kansas State University in Urban Education.

As a young adult, Bonds gave up quilting to pursue more of an activist role through community engagement; "As soon as I could, I gave up quilting to raise hell in all sorts of ways that were meaningful for me at the time. Letter-writing, sit-ins, you name it. It was the 1960s and the civil rights movement."

== Career ==
Quindaro Quilt by NedRa Bonds

=== Quindaro Quilt and If Da Dirt Could Talk ===
Bonds was inspired to take up quilting once again in 1989, in protest of a legislative issue at the Quindaro Townsite. Legislation was being proposed that would allow Browning Ferris Industries to build a landfill on top of the Old Quindaro Cemetery site. Bonds made her Quindaro Quilt in protest, to emphasize the complicated and important history of Quindaro as a stop along the National Underground Railroad System of Historic Trails. Bonds attended city council meetings almost every two weeks for eight years. At these meetings, she would get out her quilt and for the five minutes she was allotted used it as a backdrop to illustrate what a "...travesty it was to throw all that away in the name of a landfill". It was during this time that Bonds met her future collaborator and friend, Nancy Dawson.

If Da Dirt Could Talk was a collaboration between the playwright, professor, and performance artist Nancy Dawson and the quilter and activist NedRa Bonds. Funded by the Charlotte Street Foundation's Rocket Grant, Bonds and Dawson created a series of socially-engaged works that discussed the overlooked history of Old Quindaro. A direct inspiration for Dawson came from stories of her grandmother, Elizabeth Thompson, who escaped slavery to Old Quindaro and was eventually buried in the Old Quindaro Cemetery. As a part of this project, Bonds traveled to public schools in the Kansas City area, leading workshops on community heroes and local history. She taught children about local heroes, like Quindaro-born singer and performer Janelle Monae, and printed the children's hero-drawings onto cloth, which she then quilted together into her Hero Quilts. Both Bonds and Dawson created quilts for this project, which were then included in productions of Dawson's original play, Stories From da Dirt, held at the Old Quindaro Cemetery. Through quilting and performances, Bonds and Dawson sought to make their communities aware of everyday heroes and the complicated history behind the places that people live.

At the 2016 Rocket Grant Ceremony at La Esquina, Bonds reflected on If Da Dirt Could Talk / The Hero Quilt Project, introducing artist, organizer, and activist Michael Toombs as a "living example" of an everyday hero.

=== Social justice and community involvement ===
In 2010, Bonds received the Arts Council of Metropolitan Kansas City's Inspiration Grant, which she used to create a quilt celebrating the UMKC Women’s Center's 40th anniversary, as part of the exhibition Her Art: Who does She think She is, which ran from April 1 through May 13, 2011. Her Women's Equity Quilt, a collaborative effort where Kansas City and UMKC community members each made one square for a larger quilt, has been recognized nationally by both the University of Nebraska–Lincoln and the University of Michigan as an "outstanding community effort in addressing social justice".

Bonds has taught workshops locally to schoolchildren in Kansas City and internationally to women in Nairobi, Kenya through the 1994 Community Problem Solving Program International Exchange, Arusha, Tanzania, and Port-au-Prince, Haiti. In 2008, she participated in an American Studies Association conference in Istanbul, Turkey. Bonds was recently invited to participate in an exchange in Cuba, with other textile artists.

Bonds describes her intention in making art as creating "small changes in perception" that enact social change. She uses the changes she makes on fabric to illustrate current social issues, and help viewers think about them in new and important ways. She compares small changes in her work to the small change of capitalizing the "R" in NedRa—"I spell my name with a capital 'R' for ART… So, just as changing the 'R' in my name creates a whole new persona, small changes in perception, can change society."

In discussing her quilt made in response to the shooting of Michael Brown in Ferguson, Missouri, titled The Fist and The Finger, Bonds comments on her use of quilting as a softer social platform: "This is a way of creating a tension without intimidating anyone. It's just fabric, after all. When we come into this world they wrap us in a cloth. When we leave the world, they wrap us in a cloth. It's just fabric!" For this particular quilt, Bonds has incorporated black, white, and brown hands, a majority of which are held up in reference to "Hands up, don't shoot", the text in the background of the quilt and the slogan created around the last words and actions of Michael Brown. Tiny cheerleader figures surround a central fist, pointing directly at the viewer. The cheerleaders represent children at school, cheering on a team and raising their hands in class; "Children should only have to put their hands up to ask questions in class or give an opinion. And they should use their fists for cheering on their team, not fighting in the streets."

The Fist and The Finger by NedRa Bonds

Bonds was a long-time educator at various schools in Kansas City, but retired to devote herself full time to her art practice. She is still involved in her community, working on collaborative mural projects like the Wak’ó Mujeres Phụ nữ Women Mural and the second version of Dave Lowenstein's Pollinators mural, both in Lawrence, Kansas. An illustration of Bonds was included in a mural titled Kansas Women Work for Justice in Topeka, Kansas.

=== Other works ===
Bonds takes symbolism from contemporary political and social issues and cuts it up, pastes it down, and stitches it back together with fabric and beads. She said, "Sometimes I work straight through and create a quilt in a couple of days. At the other extreme, I have one that took two years. I created these little beaded masks that were an inch square, and after I'd created about 40 of them I decided to put them all together into a face." That quilt is called A Kiss from the Ancestors—it incorporates elaborate beaded silhouettes of the faces of a relative and child, with various music symbols, like drums, brass instruments, and the treble clef, which reference Kansas City's important role in the history of Jazz. This quilt was included in the recent exhibition at the Spencer Museum of Art in Lawrence, Kansas, And Still We Rise: Race, Culture, and Visual Conversations, and was acquired by the museum.

While going through treatment for breast cancer, Bonds has been creating a series of works around her struggle with cancer. She hopes to have these works come together in an exhibition at a hospital, to support those going through treatment and start conversations. Her first series, The Hands that Heal, are intricate individually beaded hands representing and recognizing the hands of every individual that touched her during her treatment, especially those who are often overlooked—the nurse assistants, receptionists, students, and people that helped her park her car. Her second work is titled The Day I Became a Barcode. Bonds has been saving her hospital wrist bracelets and plans to create a three-dimensional work from them. She wants people living with cancer to know that "you have control over your body—it's about how you respond to it."

A recent quote from Bonds summarizes her parallel practices of quilting and activism; "I'm 68 but still keep blank placards and marker pens in the back of my car in case I need to stop and picket somebody. I've got a sewing machine in there too, because I've found you never quite know when a situation might arise in which one is required. I call this 'being ready'."

=== Solo exhibitions ===
- 2011 Art Institute, Kansas City MO
- 2011 Mid-America Arts Alliance, Kansas City MO
- 2011 Hotel Metropolitan Museum, Paducah KY
- 2012 Now Showing, Kansas City MO
- 2012 Stitches, Miller Nichols Library, Kansas City MO
- 2014 Missouri University, Columbia MO

=== Group exhibitions ===
- 2003 Celebrations and Investigations Kansas City Jewish Museum's Epsten Gallery at Village Shalom, Kansas City KS
- 2011 New England Quilt Museum, Lowell MA
- 2011 Wonder Women: SHEroes, Freedom Fighters, & Women Who Kick Butt! as part of HerArt, Kansas City MO
- 2011 The Light in the Other Room: First Light, Changing Gallery, American Jazz Museum, Kansas City MO
- 2012 Friends, Country Club Christian Church, Kansas City MO
- 2012 Ella: 1st Lady of Song, American Jazz Museum, Kansas City MO
- 2012 Women to Watch: Focus on Fiber and Textiles, UMKC HerArt Project, Kansas City MO
- 2013 Bruce Watkins Cultural Center, Kansas City MO
- 2013 Fractured Fabrics, Overland Park KS
- 2013 Quilted Friendship: The Art of NedRa Bonds and Nancy Dawson, Miller Nichols Library, UMKC Volker Campus, Kansas City MO
- 2014 Her Art Project: WONDER WOMEN: SHEroes, Freedom Fighters, & Women Who Kick Butt!, Leedy-Voulkos Arts Center, Kansas City MO
- 2014 Brown V Board of Education 60th Anniversary, Mulvane Arts Center, Topeka KS
- 2018 And Still We Rise: Race, Culture, and Visual Conversations, Spencer Museum of Art, Lawrence KS
- 2018 Depictions: People, Places and Things, KC Black Arts Network at the Black Archives of Mid-America, Kansas City MO

=== Collections ===
Her work is included in the American Jazz Museum, the Spencer Museum of Art, Sprint, H&R Block, Saint Luke's Women's Center, and Arrowhead Arts Collections.

Bonds has an artist file located in the Spencer Art Reference Library through their Artists' File Initiative at the Nelson-Atkins Museum of Art.

=== Commissions and workshops ===
- 2011 Soft Sculpture, National Museum of Toys and Miniatures, Kansas City MO
- 2012 Art Smart Series, Briarwood Elementary School, Overland Park KS
- 2011 Quilt Camp UMKC, Kansas City MO
- 2013 The Doll as Art, Nelson-Atkins Museum of Art, Kansas City MO
- 2013 Connecting Threads, Kansas City Chiefs Football Club, Kansas City MO
- 2013 Workshop series Landon Center on Aging/KU Med, Kansas City KS
- 2017 Juneteenth Celebration talk, Nelson-Atkins Museum of Art, Kansas City MO
- 2020 Champions for Health Youth Summit, collaborative work with students from Kansas and Missouri, Heroes (We can make a difference), Kansas City, Missouri
