= American Watercolor Society =

American artists' non-profit organization

Coordinates: 40°45′58″N 73°58′51″W

Watercolorist Tom Nicholas painting at an American Watercolor Society demonstration

The American Watercolor Society, founded as the American Society of Painters in Water Colors in 1866, is a nonprofit membership organization devoted to the advancement of watercolor painting in the United States. It changed its name to the American Water Color Society in the early 20th century, later merging with the New York Water Color Club to become the American Watercolor Society in the 1940s.

== Qualifications ==
AWS judges the work of a painter before granting admission to the society as an "active" (now "signature") member. Such membership in the society now is considered an indication of the painter having established a consistent style and to have demonstrated considerable skill in the medium. Transparency in the works of water color painters is highly valued. That is a technique wherein the paper surface is allowed to show through the applied paint as an integral aspect of the painting. The applicant usually must demonstrate a history of winning prizes in juried art shows with professional standing to gain admission. This type of membership in the society, generally, is signalled by "AWS" following the painter's name in promotional materials and biographies. Membership by others is indicated as an "associate" status.

== History ==
The society was founded in 1866 by eleven painters and was originally known as the American Society of Painters in Water Colors. Initially, it was difficult to draw in new members, partially because some artists of the time opposed the society's policy of allowing women to join. The New York Watercolor Club merged into the society in 1941.

=== New York Watercolor Club ===
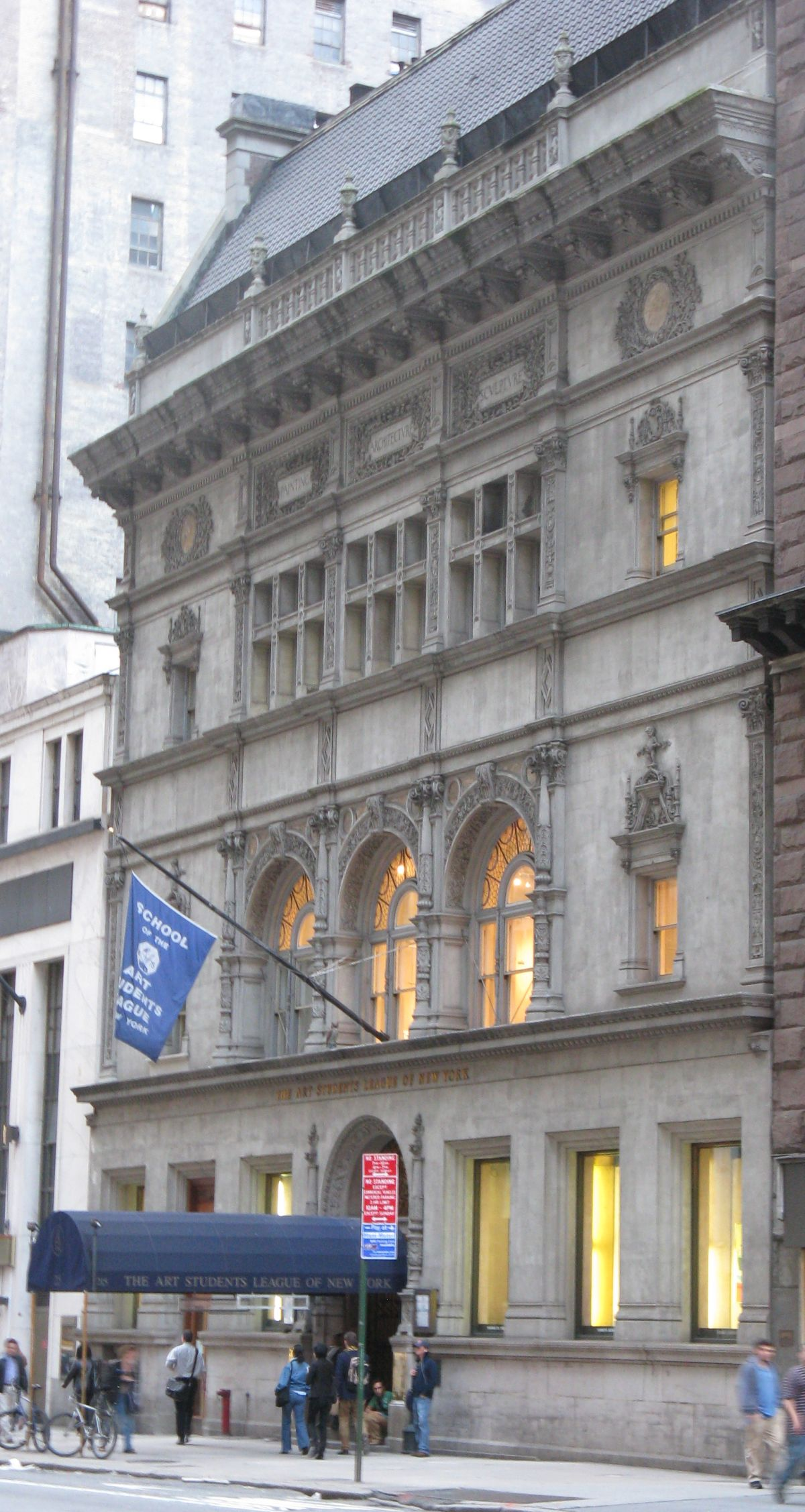
American Fine Arts Building, where the club was headquartered and held its annual exhibits (Note: The building was constructed as the result of the founding of the American Fine Arts Society in 1889. Other art organizations headquartered in the building were the American Federation of Arts, American Water Color Society, Artists' Aid Society, Mural Painters, and the Art Students League of New York. Its galleries held National Academy of Design, Architectural League and New York Water Color Club exhibitions.)

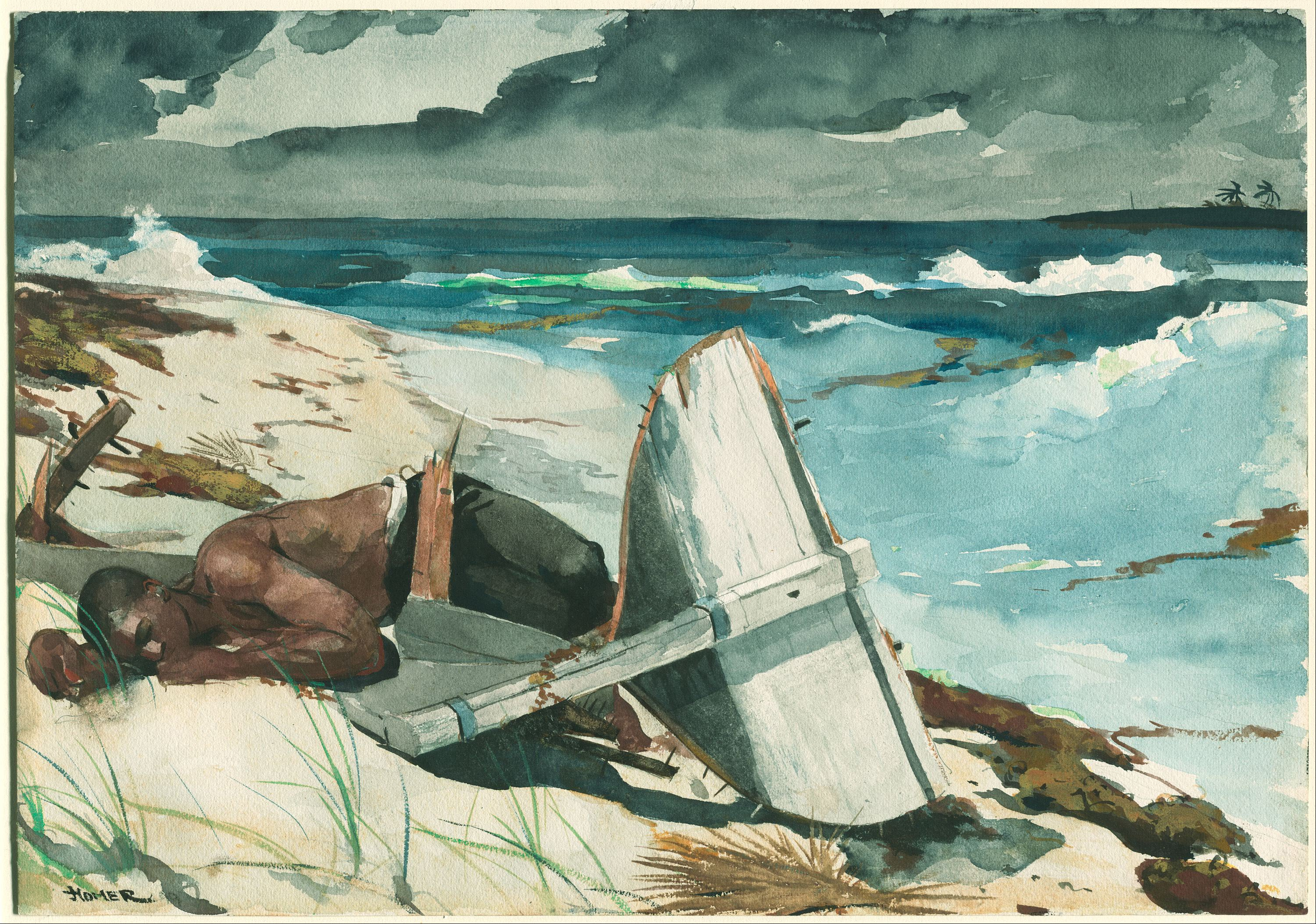
Winslow Homer, After the Hurricane, Bahamas, 1899, drawing and watercolor, exhibited at the New York Watercolor Club exhibition in 1902

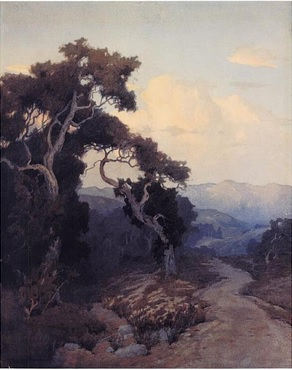
Marion Wachtel, Sunset Clouds, 1904

The New York Water Color Club (NYWC) was founded in 1890, accepting both men and women artists as members and officers, and held its first exhibition that year. Childe Hassam was the organization's first president. NYWC was organized in response to refusal by the American Watercolor Society (AWS) to accept women members and to organize an annual exhibition in the fall. In comparison to AWS, it held jury-selected exhibitions which meant stricter standards for the content included in its shows. The club had male and female members and officers, whereas the American Watercolor Society did not accept women as members of their organization until 1897.

Its headquarters and site of its annual exhibition was in the American Fine Arts Building at 215 West 57th Street. The club was represented in the Fine Arts Federation of New York and with other art and architectural organizations on the board of the National Academy Association. In 1918, the club had 175 members and exhibited 581 works by 301 artists in its annual exhibition. Of the 581 works of art, 501 of were watercolors.

The club combined exhibition venues with the American Water Color Society between 1922 and 1931. The two organizations merged, having created a new constitution, and was named the American Watercolor Society in January 1941. The effort was led by Roy Henry Brown, president of the American Watercolor Society.

Its records are archived at the Smithsonian Archives of American Art.

Catherine Tharp Altvater (1907–1984) was the first woman to hold office in the society. In 2008 Jim McFarlane took over presidency from Janet Walsh.

==== Members ====
Influential members within the organization were:

- William Merritt Chase (1849–1916)
- George Henry Clements (1854–1935)
- Paula Eliasoph (1895–1983)
- Lydia Field Emmet (1866–1952)
- William C. Fitler, husband of Claude Raguet Hirst, charter member
- John La Farge (1835–1910)
- Rhoda Holmes Nicholls (1854–1930) served as vice president, member of jury selection, and served on all its committees
- Emily Maria Scott (1832–1915)
- Alex F. Yaworski (1907–1997)

== See also ==
- Woman's Art Club of New York
- MacDowell Club
- Amy Torbert, "Annual Exhibition Record of the American Watercolor Society, 1867–1921" (version 2, 2019)
