= George H. Clements (artist) =

American painter (1854–1935)

- Born: George Henry Clements; February 12, 1854; San Luis Obispo, California
- Died: December 16, 1935 (aged 81); Oberlin, Louisiana

George Henry Clements (February 12, 1854 – December 16, 1935) was an American artist who was best known for the watercolor paintings he made in an impressionist style. Critics said his work was characterized by "exact observation" and "vivid, brief, suggestive" treatment of his subjects. Working outdoors, often while cruising on a custom-made sailboat, he chose sea and coastal scenes as his most frequent subjects. He had a folklorist's appreciation of Louisiana's Creole culture and was a supporter of civil rights for the Black communities that were oppressed by Jim Crow laws in that state.

His father having died in the year of his birth, Clements was raised by his mother in New Orleans. He began his art career by making portraits and genre paintings in that city and at a family-owned plantation nearby. To advance his training, he traveled first to Boston and then New York, where he took classes for a year at the Art Students League. He next traveled to Paris, where he studied at the Académie Julian and the Académie Colarossi. He recognized the portability and rapidity of watercolor painting while on a walking tour to Florence and thereafter used that medium for most of his work.

Throughout most of his career he showed mostly in group exhibitions held by nonprofit organizations and during the last decade of it he received solo exhibitions from commercial galleries in New York and Boston.

Although known best for his paintings, Clements was also an illustrator and on occasion an art instructor.

== Early life and training ==
Clements was born on February 12, 1854, in San Luis Obispo, California. Later that year, after his father was killed by a bear while hunting on his ranch, Clements's mother took him and his three older brothers back to her family home in New Orleans. He grew up in that city and on reaching adulthood began work as a clerk in a New Orleans cotton factor's office. Having found in himself both talent and interest in making art, he then began a career as a portraitist and genre painter. At age 26 in 1880, he left Louisiana for a brief stay in Texas and then New York City, where he studied at the Art Students League. A year later he travelled to Paris to study first at the Académie Julian in Paris and later at the Académie Colarossi. In 1886 Clements travelled in Florence and Rome and the following year returned to the US.

== Career in art ==
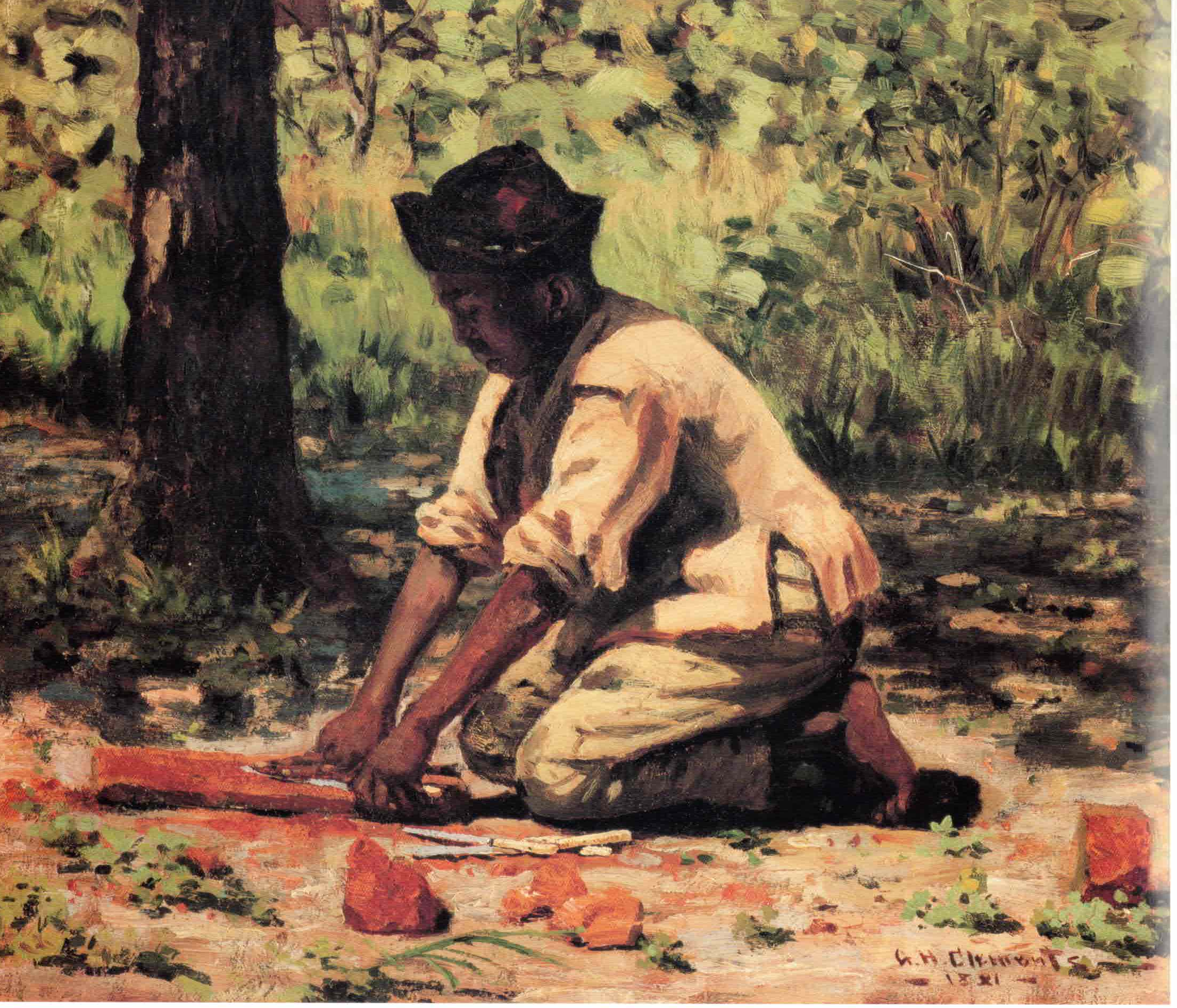
George Henry Clements, Sharpening the Knives, oil on canvas, 1881, 14 1/2 x 17 1/2 inches

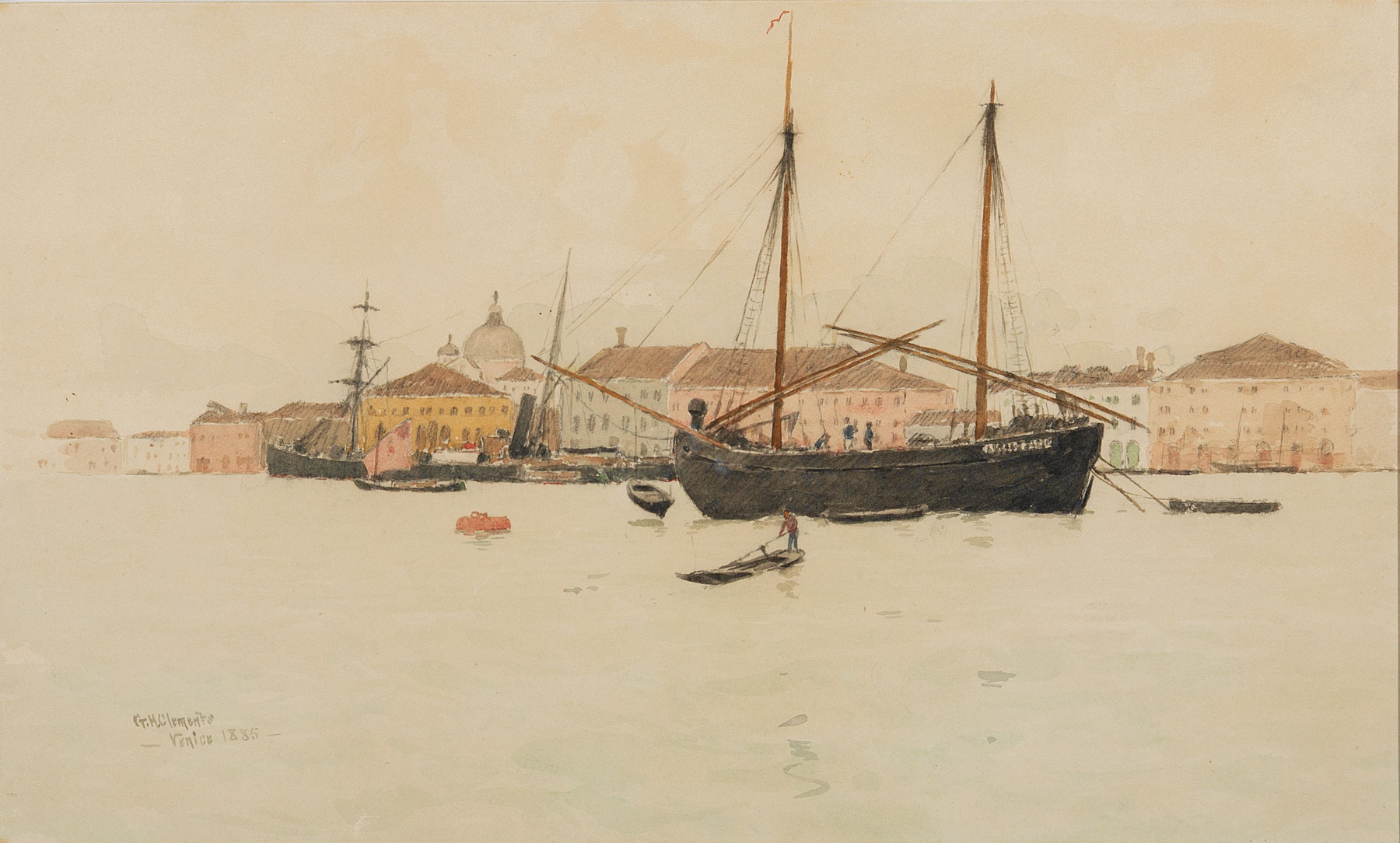
George Henry Clements, Venice, watercolor on paper, 1885, 12 x 20 inches

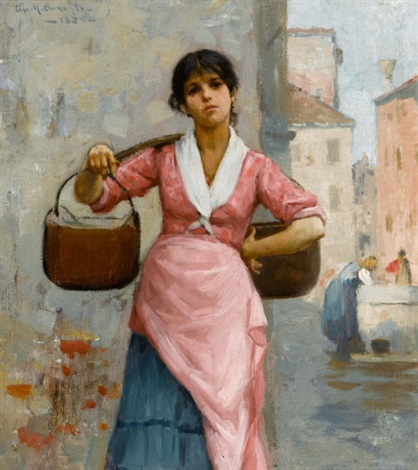
George Henry Clements, Water Girl, oil on canvas, 1885, 12 3/4 x 11 inches

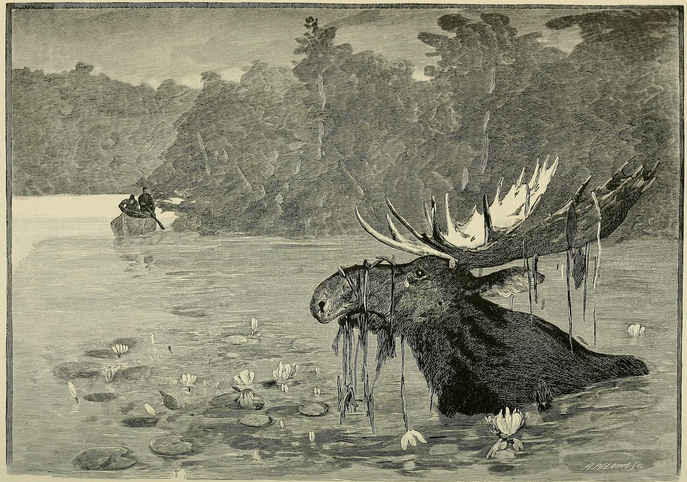
George Henry Clements, Moose Feeding on Coarse Grasses, illustration, 1889

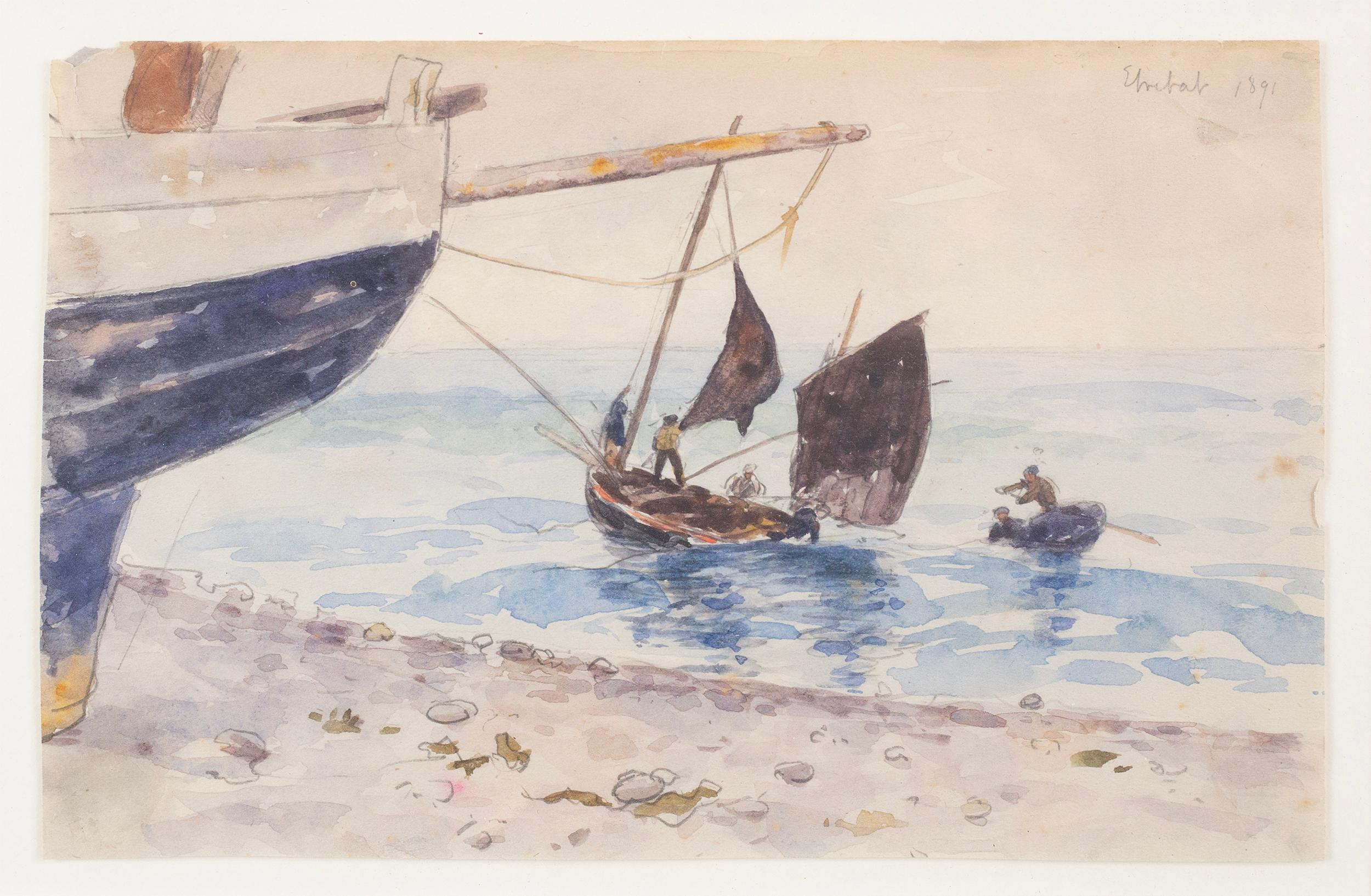
George Henry Clements, Brittany France, watercolor on paper, 1891, 4 3/4 x 7 3/4 inches

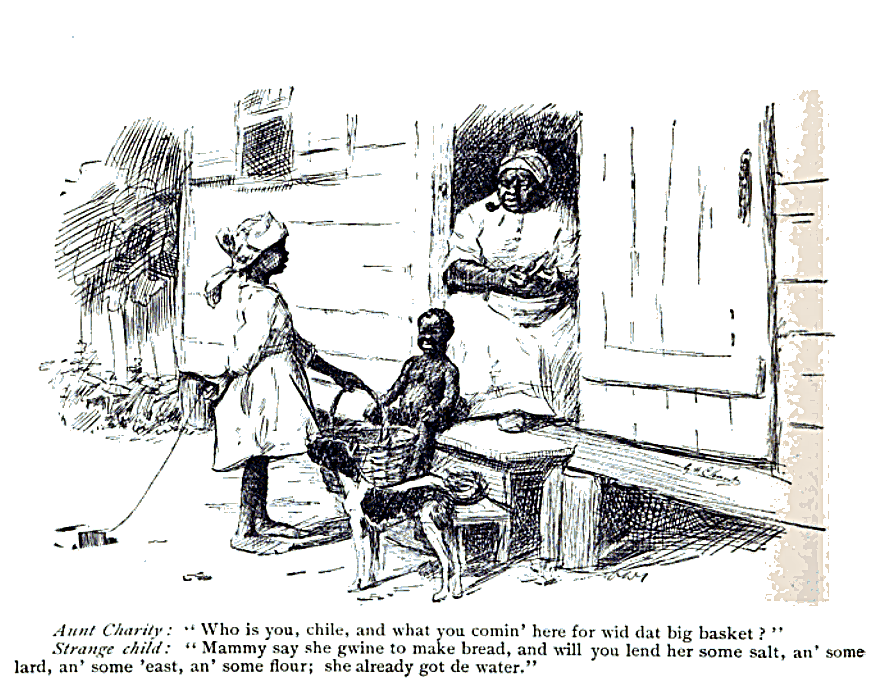
George Henry Clements, Aunt Charity and the Strange Child, illustration, Symposium, January 1896

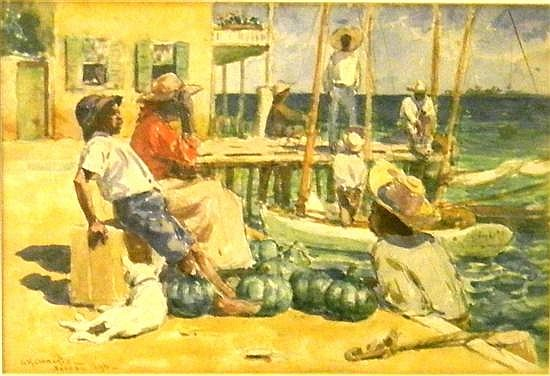
George Henry Clements, Nassau, watercolor on paper, 1896, 7 1/4 x 10 3/8 inches

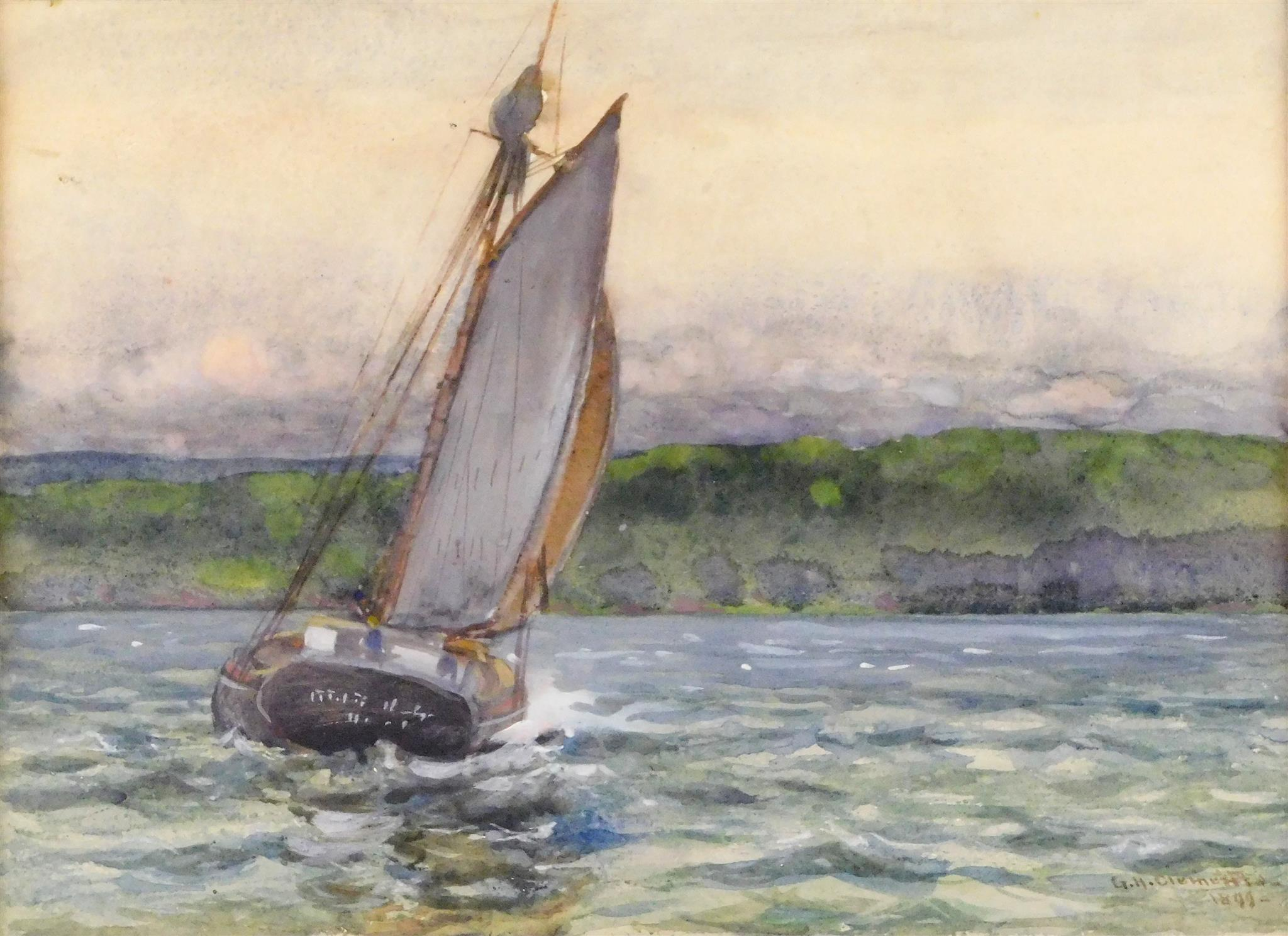
George Henry Clements, Sailboat, watercolor on paper, 1899, 10 1/2 x 14 1/2 inches

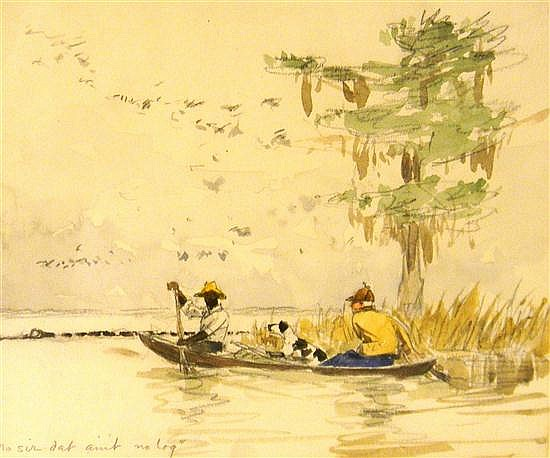
George Henry Clements, "No Sir, dat aint no log", watercolor on paper, 1905, 7 3/4 x 9 1/4 inches

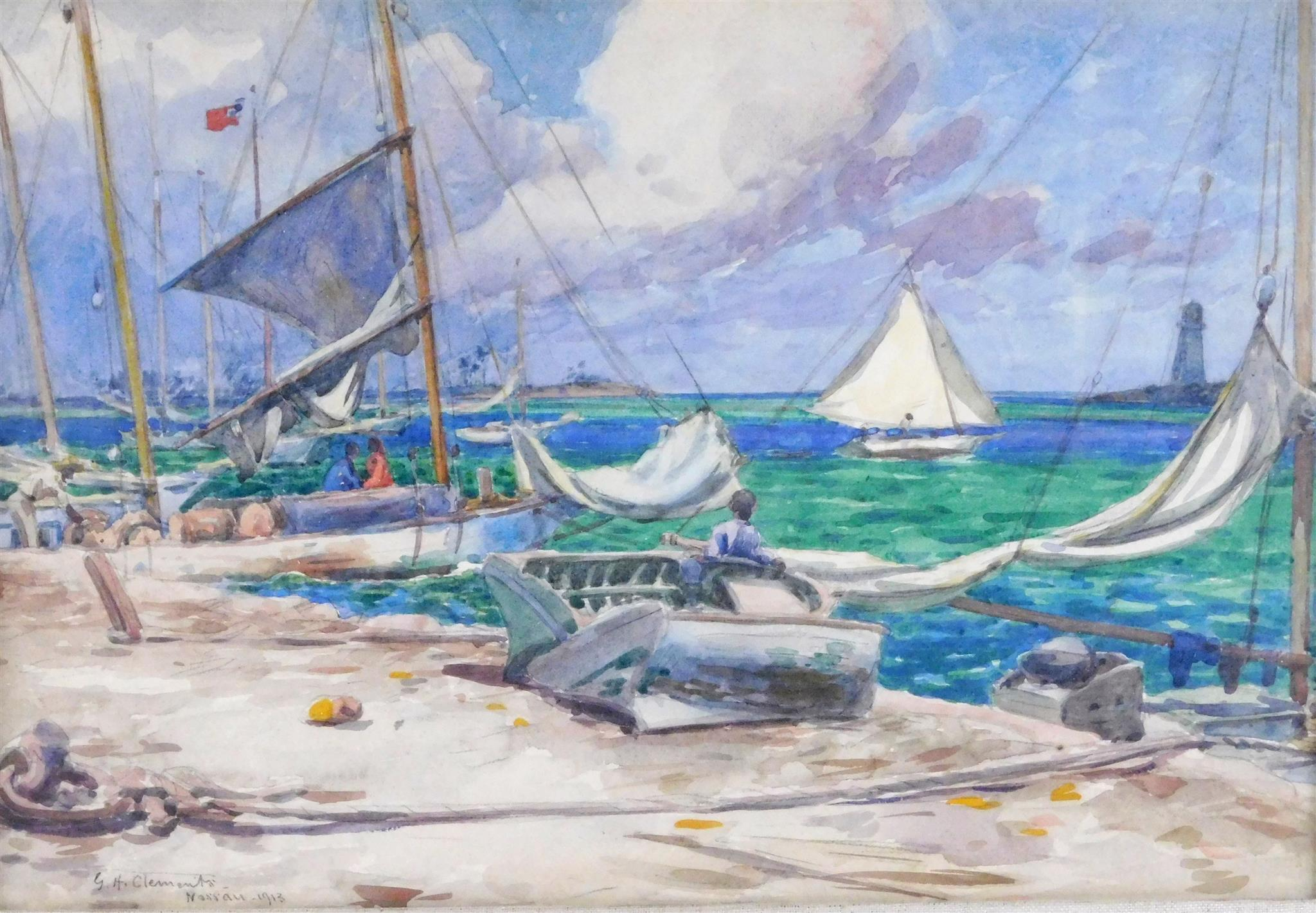
George Henry Clements, Nassau, watercolor on paper, 1913

While living in New Orleans, Clements became friends with the novelist George W. Cable. The two men celebrated Louisiana's creole culture and shared a fervent opposition to the state's oppressive Jim Crow laws. In 1884, the New York Times reported that Cable had covered the walls of his workroom with Clements's paintings. In an article called "Creole Cable's Workshop", a reporter said the Clements paintings had "much force of expression".

In 1886, while Clements was studying at Académie Colarossi, the art gallery of the Southern Exposition of Art, Industry, and Agriculture in Louisville, Kentucky, put two of Clements's paintings on display; one, a portrait, and the other a view of Venice. That year, he also began a career as an illustrator when a popular author, Elizabeth Stuart Phelps, asked her publisher to hire him and another artist to illustrate one of her best-known stories, "The Madonna of the Tubs".

On returning to the US the following year, he rented a studio in Boston and is thought to have begun teaching at the Boston Museum of Fine Arts School. At this time he also began making illustrations for New York-based magazine publishers. In 1887 he showed plantation scenes in a group exhibition at the Boston Paint and Clay Club. At this time Clements wrote an article in Arts and Letters magazine in which he criticized American artists and collectors for seeking art excellence in Europe rather than America. Clements wrote that having returned from France he felt "impelled to cry aloud to my fellow countrymen exhorting them to feel more confidence in the aesthetic possibilities and accomplishments of our great republic." The following year he showed oils and watercolors in a solo exhibition at a club in Northampton, Massachusetts, and the year after that contributed illustrations for an article on moose hunting in Outing magazine .

In 1890 Clements participated for the first of many occasions in an exhibition held by the New York Watercolor Club. When he showed at the club again two years later, his work received an extensive review in The Critic. Describing Clements's paintings as "well written", the author praised his use of form and color to make "a distinct mental, as well as a visual, impression." This reviewer said Clements had achieved "one of the most purely artistic performances that we have seen this season."

Clements's paintings were again singled out for comment during Water Color Club exhibitions of 1893, 1894, and 1895. Writing in the London-based Magazine of Art, a critic praised his French landscapes and a critic for Art Amateur said he handled "watercolors as though he had dabbled in them from infancy", adding that he was "marvelously happy in seizing the exact moment when nature had placed a nearly perfect picture before him, and not less so in stopping his brush before she had included too much." Writing in the New York Times and The Critic, reviewers praised a painting called "A Tangerine Wedding Procession" in 1894, the one calling it, "a glorious round dance of color" and the other noting the "fury of action" it showed. The latter added, "Mr. Clements’s great talent is in his thorough comprehension of the matter in hand. Every line, every touch of color is expressive, and the picture is the crushed-out essence of the subject." The following year, Art Interchange, a general-audience magazine, noted the "power and authority" in Clements's painting and placed him in the front rank among artists of his day.

Clements showed at the National Academy of Design while the 1895 Watercolor Society exhibition was still on view. In reviewing the show, Art Amateur's critic described at some length his "extraordinary merits". By this time, Clements and his family were living in a house in Flushing, Queens, that had been designed by his wife. A local newspaper called it "a perfect reproduction of the New England colonial architecture". In 1896, he showed in both the Boston Arts Club and the Society of American Artists in New York.

In 1900 he bought a sailboat. Built to his specifications, it had ample room to accommodate his family and friends in comfort. A news report said it was "staunch and seaworthy" and could be 'stocked for an extended cruise." Soon after taking possession, he departed on a summer-long expedition.

In 1901 a German art annual reported that he had been spending most of the year sailing along the coasts of New England, the Gulf of Mexico, and the Mississippi. Its reporter said he spent his time painting, "drawing his subjects now from groups of lounging Mexicans, now from sober Gloucester fishermen, or from New Orleans Italian dock workers." When Clements traveled to New Orleans, he often painted genre and landscape watercolors at a plantation near Opelousas, Louisiana, that was owned by members of his mother's family, the Toledanos.

When a Water Color Club show that opened in November 1900 devoted a whole gallery to a display of 78 Clements paintings, the German art annual's reviewer described them as showing great skill. Other critics found the show highly entertaining and "decidedly refreshing", but one felt the works displayed were repetitive and monotonous and, while praising the paintings' vivid color and keen sunlight, a critic for the New York Times wondered "why Mr. Clements should have been given an entire gallery and an opportunity to hang 78 pictures in so comparatively small an exhibition."

During the rest of the first decade of the twentieth century, Clements continued to participate in group exhibitions and in 1913 illustrated a collection of short lyrics, each having a refrain that pointed to a moral lesson. Called Daddy Do-Funny's Wisdom Jingles, the book was well received when it first appeared in 1913 and received renewed attention in recent years after its author—popular story-teller Ruth McEnery Stuart—was rediscovered feminist and social literary critics.

In 1914 Clements was given a solo exhibition in Detroit. This was followed in the early 1920s by a succession of solos in, respectively, New York (1921 at the Milch Gallery) Buffalo (1923 at the Albright Gallery), Boston (1924 at the Copley Gallery), and New York again (1928 at the Babcock Gallery).

After his wife died in 1931, Clements stopped exhibiting and moved back to Louisiana where he lived with his brother Edward. He was 81 years old when he died at his brother's home on December 17, 1935.

=== Artistic style and critical reception ===
The most really satisfactory feature of the whole [1901 Water Color Club] exhibition was the special separate display of nearly six dozen examples by George H. Clements, washed in freshly, and with an enthusiastic delight in the operation. The grain of the paper is allowed to contribute to the effect; its whiteness is left in places undisturbed; there is no attempt to secure atmosphere by pumping on the drawing or fumbling over it with brush or blotter. The painter has enjoyed the scene and made a vivid, brief, suggestive record; a trivial one often, but still honestly unaffected. The net impression of this room full of drawings was decidedly refreshing, and made one find a good many of the other exhibits labored and unimaginative.

— Charles H. Caffin, "New York Water Color Club", The Artist (vol. 30, December, 1901, pages 9-10)

Clements made both oil and watercolor paintings. Critics noted his skillful handling of color in both mediums but generally considered the subdued tones of his oils to be outmatched by the bright hues of the watercolors. Although he made some early portraits, outdoor scenes dominate his work. These were seascapes, often showing sailboats; genre scenes, often showing manual laborers; and landscapes, often of coastal subjects.

He was known as a watercolorist. In the early 1880s, while on a walking trip from Paris to Florence, he came to recognize the portability and immediacy of watercolor for artists who were traveling light and thereafter, during his frequent travels, made a great number of watercolor paintings.

Early in his career, he was noted for the "exact observation", "thorough comprehension of the matter in hand", and force and expression in his paintings.

His technique was impressionistic and often atmospheric. In 1895 a critic was impressed by Clements's "knowledge of color values brought to a masterly perfection" and a few years later another noted his "great skill in the treatment of light watercolors and interest in the study of light and atmospheric mood". Calling attention to the sense of immediacy he was able to convey in his watercolors, a critic noted a talent for making a "vivid, brief, suggestive record". Another said he was "technically as fluent and as firm as he is in sentiment pleasing and exhilarating."

In 1901, a critic said his watercolors were "washed in freshly, and with an enthusiastic delight in the operation."

== Additional roles ==
Clements began to illustrate magazines in the mid-1880s.

Elizabeth Stuart Phelps was an early feminist author whose novels and stories were well-regarded in the late 19th and early 20th centuries. In 1885 she published a Christmas story about a Gloucester, Massachusetts, fisherman's wife. Called "Madonna of the Tubs", it appeared in the December issue of Harper's Monthly and a year later Houghton Mifflin republished it as a standalone book. At Phelps's request, the publisher hired Clements and an artist working near Gloucester, to provide illustrations. A reviewer for Atlantic Monthly said the two artists' pictures were "of great artistic value and charm." Writing in Art Amateur another reviewer praised the emotional impact of one of the drawings.

In 1889 Clements and two other artists made illustrations for an article on moose hunting in Aroostook, Maine, for Outing magazine. His drawing called "Moose Feeding on Coarse Grasses and Yellow Water Lilies" appeared as frontispiece to the article.

In 1896 Clements wrote and illustrated an article for Symposium magazine called "Extracts from a Plantation Sketch-Book". The piece deals mainly with pigs and other plantation animals. In comparing the fat pigs raised by White planters with the scrawny razorbacks raised by the plantation's Black cabin-dwellers, he contrasted the plantation's dyspeptic bosses with the "well-nourished and muscularly powerful" field hands. Clements also illustrated a story in that issue. Called "Queen-Esther's Chris'mus Gif" and written by Alice Gale Woodbury, it was a sentimental tale, told largely in Black dialect, about a Christmas gift from a kindly White woman to the disabled daughter of a Black laundress. Clements contributed a drawing to another issue of the magazine. Its caption concerned the surprise of a Black woman named Aunt Charity when a young girl came by to say, "Mammy say she gwine to make bread, and will you lend her some salt, an' some lard, an' some 'east, an' some flour; she already got de water."

In 1905 Clements wrote and illustrated an article on crocodile hunting for Recreation magazine. He was no fan of the professional hunters who slaughtered the reptiles for the 25 or 50 cents they could earn selling their skins. He wrote: "There is no sufficiently expressive adjective in the English language to qualify the kind of sportsman who joyously butchers a sleeping 'gator adorning the shore of a romantic bayou in the Sunny South."

In 1913 Clements illustrated a collection of short lyrics, each having a refrain that pointed to a moral lesson. Called Daddy Do-Funny's Wisdom Jingles, the book was well-received when it first appeared in 1913 despite its use of Black dialect and the one-sided depiction of Black loyalty to White employers and former enslavers. A typical review at the time of its publication described the book as encompassing "the quaint charm of plantation life" and called the eponymous tale-teller a "loving old village philosopher full of the poetry and rhythm of his race." Crediting its author with a focus on gender issues and "tentative forays into feminist fiction", a modern reviewer said, "the atrocities of Reconstruction and the violent repression of blacks in the real South were forgotten as Stuart's humorous and pathetic black characters spoke garbled truths in dialect on behalf of a silenced and forgotten race." The book's poems, and its accompanying illustrations were mostly about animals. The one devoted to "The Canary" is an example:

De little yaller cage-bird preems 'is wings
An' he mounts 'is pyerch an' sings an' sings;
He feels 'is cage, but I s'pec' he 'low
To take what comes an' sing anyhow!
An' you ain't by yo'self, little bird, in dat—

No, you ain't by yo'self in dat.

Reviewers did not comment on the quality of Clements's drawings, but at least on one occasion, a magazine reproduced one (in a 1913 review in The Bookman).

Little has been written about Clements's work as an art teacher. One source says he was probably teaching while living in Boston and another source says he taught for a number of years after moving to New York.

== Personal life and family ==
Clements's father was a prosperous physician, Joseph Baron Clements (1824–1854), who, while out hunting on his ranch, was killed by a bear in Clements's infancy. Soon after becoming widowed, Clements's mother, Elizabeth Louisa Toledano Clements, returned to her native New Orleans with Clements and his three older brothers. A member of the Toledano family, to which his mother belonged, owned a plantation near Opelousas, Louisiana, where Clements first encountered the plantation life that became the subject of many of his paintings.

The US Census for 1870 lists Clements's given name as Henry. A legal document filed in 1873 gives his name as Henry Terre Clements and a city directory of 1875 gives it as Henry G. Clements and lists him as a clerk. The issue of the same directory for the following year lists him as Henry G. Clements, an artist.

When his mother died in 1913, an obituary reported that her only brother was killed in a battle that took place on "September 14", year unspecified, and that three of her sons took part in the battle. The conflict to which the obit referred was known as the Battle of Liberty Place or the Battle of September 14, 1874. The event was an insurrection by members of a secret society called the White League against Louisiana's Reconstruction government. The insurrectionists succeeded in defeating police and local militia and, after federal forces negotiated their surrender, no charges were brought against them and they were permitted to resume their lives as if the battle had never occurred. Sources do not say whether Clements was one of the brothers who fought in the engagement. However, in the years prior to and following the insurrection, Clements's friend, the New Orleans novelist George Washington Cable, had written articles defending the civil rights of Blacks and supporting the aims of the Reconstruction Government, and after both men had moved to New York, Clements wrote Cable to say he was sick of the "nightmare" of living in a "melancholy atmosphere of slavery and criminal prejudice" Because there were so few New Orleans citizens who spoke out for civil rights and against racial injustice, the two men may well have first met as members of that minority. They had other attributes in common. The fathers of both had died young and both had been raised by their mothers. Cable worked as a cotton factor at a time when Clements was a clerk in New Orleans Cotton Exchange. Both were amateur folklorists of Louisiana's Creole culture in general and Creoles of color in particular. Regardless of how they became associated with one another, by 1884 they were sufficiently close that a reporter described Cable's study as having on its walls, "Several landscapes in oil of Louisiana scenery and a Negro figure piece—all by George H. Clements".

In 1888 Clements married a woman from an old New England family named Caroline Curtis Dixwell. They had two children, twins named Brent Dixwell Clements and Anna Dixwell Clements.

Made in 1899 and put in service the next year, Clements's yacht, called "Adventure", was a 48-foot yawl fitted out for cruising in comfort. It possessed a centerboard rather than a keel for reducing side slip when sailing into the wind, and was consequently able to operate in shallow as well deep waters, Built for him in a New Rochelle, New York, boatyard, it was, according to one reporter, "a house boat and yacht combined, in which all the points that make for speed have been sacrificed for comfort." Clements used the boat for coastal cruising from locations in Maine in the north down to Florida and the Gulf Coast in the south. On one of these cruises, an artist friend, Vinton Clayton, was attacked by a panther while ashore at St. John's River near Jacksonville, Florida. Another time, Clements had to call on the US Lifesaving Service to tow the sailboat outbound through breakers at Beaufort Inlet along the coast of North Carolina.

In 1909 Clements and his family bought a studio apartment at 27 West 67th Street, an innovative cooperative building built by artists in 1901. Clements bought the apartment from one of the coop's founding members, Childe Hassam.

After his wife died Clements moved from New York back to Louisiana to live with his brother, Edward S. Clements, and his family in rural Oberlin. He died there at the age of 81 on December 16, 1935. An obituary said, "he was very fond of children and spent a great deal of time making balls and toys for the little folks and his charities among the poor and distressed were well known."
