= Kenneth Toombs =

20th-century American librarian and academic

Kenneth Eldridge Toombs (25 August 1928 – 4 March 2008), AKA Kenneth Toombs and Kenneth E. Toombs, was 20th-century American best known as director of the libraries of the University of South Carolina (1967-1988).

== Career ==
Toombs helped establish the University of South Carolina's Thomas Cooper Library and Law Library and co-founded the Southeastern Library Network. He helped establish the South Caroliniana Library by approving Thomas L. Johnson as its first field archivist and who interviewed Grace Lumpkin for the archive. He also helped in establishing rights for southern chapters of the American Library Association.

== Awards ==
- Rothrock Award, Southeastern Library Association (contribution to Solinet System)

== Legacy ==
- Kenneth E. Toombs Fellowship Fund in Library and Information Science, University of South Carolina

== Works ==
- "Interview with Grace Lumpkin" (1971)
- "Large Academic Libraries" (1977)

== See also ==
- University of South Carolina
