= Arthur Kraft =

American artist

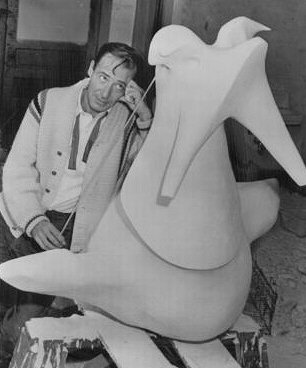
- Arthur Kraft with Albert, a 400-pound plaster walrus he created in 1960
- Born: Arthur M. Kraft; 1922; Kansas City, Missouri; United States
- Died: September 29, 1977; Kansas City, Missouri; United States
- Education: Yale University; Kansas City Art Institute; Nelson Gallery of Art
- Known for: Painting, Drawing, Sculpture
- Notable work: "Court of the Penguins" (1979) in Kansas City's Country Club Plaza; Mural at the downtown Kansas City Public Library "Family" (1961) at the Executive Plaza Office Building in Kansas City
- Movement: Expressionism

Arthur M. Kraft (1922–1977) was an American painter, sculptor and muralist. A native of Kansas City, Kraft was a member of the expressionist movement.

== Biography ==
Arthur Kraft's formal art training started with Saturday-morning classes at the Nelson Gallery of Art and by the age of 13 he was selling his work at local art fairs. Upon graduating from Southwest High School Kraft continued to pursue the arts at the Kansas City Art Institute and later at Yale University's School of Fine Arts. After serving in the Army during World War II, he returned to Yale to finish his degree. While at Yale, he served as an art editor of the campus humor magazine The Yale Record.

After winning the Audubon Artist Society national painting award in 1946, Kraft was propelled onto the national scene. Highly regarded in the artistic community, his art was exhibited in one-man showings at the Salon de Jean Cocteau, Paris, Jacques Seligmann & Company, New York, and the Landau Galleries, Los Angeles. Kraft's work was also installed in several locations across the United States.

In 1956 Kraft illustrated his longtime friend Lon Amick's widely acclaimed book The Divine Journey: A Guide to Spiritual Understanding. The book was originally published in 1956 by Press of The Pilgrim, Kansas City, Missouri. And lithographed by Williams & Lawrence Lithographers also of Kansas City, Missouri. The first edition was limited to 1000 copies and each copy was a numbered edition. The book is still in print today.

In the late 1950s Kraft was commissioned by Victor Gruen, architect of the Glendale Shopping Center in Indianapolis, Indiana, to create a sculpture for the new shopping center. The sculpture "Wynkin, Blynkin and Nod" was installed in 1960 and dedicated on October 12, 1960. The sculpture portrays three golden, stylized penguins with their flippers spread standing around a silver ball, facing inwards. The three unsigned polished bronze penguins dimensions are overall approximately 51 x 72 x 58 in. with the tallest penguin being approximately 51 x 30 x 33 in. (350 lbs.). The sculpture is currently on display at the Glendale Town Center Mall library entrance.

In 1971, Kraft was admitted to the alcoholic ward of St. Joseph's State Mental Hospital No. 2. He stayed for five weeks and was his second time in a mental hospital. Later that year, he released a limited-edition book titled "The Sounds of Fury," which included color reproductions, black-and-white sketches and stories about some of the patients. In 1972, he told The Kansas City Times that the experience gave him "a newfound sense of urgency in his work."

Kraft spent most of his life in Kansas City and continued to make art, even during his long bout with cancer. His final work was a mural for the waiting room of the Veteran's Hospital in Topeka, which he finished just before he died.

Since his death Kraft's legacy has continued to play a large role in the life of artists, especially those in Kansas City. In 2007 Betty Brand established the "Arthur Kraft Memorial Scholarship for the Visual Arts" with the Metropolitan Community College (Kansas City).

== Kraft's Best-Known Works ==
One of Kraft's best known works in the Kansas City, Missouri area is a similar penguin sculpture entitled "Court of the Penguins" and is displayed at Kansas City's Country Club Plaza. The five-foot bronze sculptures, dedicated on October 10, 1979, were reproduced from miniatures that originally stood three to four inches tall. Kraft also designed a mosaic for the downtown Kansas City Public Library. The mural features a bold lion, a polar bear, a giraffe and several penguins and exemplifies his trademark use of color. Kraft's sculpture of three figures, entitled "Family," was dedicated at the Commerce Building in 1961, and was re-installed at the Executive Plaza Office Building at 720 Main in 1989.

== Sources and references ==
- "Kansas City Artist, Arthur Kraft, Dies". The Kansas City Times, September 29, 1977.
- "Ambassador's walls reveal a mural, a mystery". The Kansas City Star, June 29, 1983.
- "Chic Piece". Star Magazine. December 2, 1979.
- "Arthur Kraft's Mural". The Kansas City Times. April 8, 1989.
- Lon G. Amick, 1956, 1968. "The Divine Journey: A Guide to Spiritual Understanding"
- Susan Jezak Ford, 1999. "Biography of Arthur M. Kraft, 1922 - 1977"
- US Junior Chamber Ten Outstanding Young Americans (1954)
