= Charles Goslin =

- Born: February 23, 1932; Attleboro, Massachusetts, United States
- Died: May 16, 2007 (aged 75)
- Occupation: Graphic Designer

Charles Laforest Goslin (February 23, 1932 – May 16, 2007) was an American graphic designer and professor of graphic design and illustration at Pratt Institute in Brooklyn, New York (1966–2007). He also taught at the School of Visual Arts (SVA) in New York City (1975–1985). Goslin was educated at the Rhode Island School of Design (RISD) graduating in 1954. For most of his career, he worked as a one-person studio out of his home in Park Slope, Brooklyn, favoring independence over "filtering my work through another artist." He was also a popular professor known for his candid criticism and unique assignments.

His clients included IBM, Price Waterhouse, Pfizer Inc., Merck & Co., and Harper & Row. His work has been published in Graphis, Idea, Print, California Art Direction, Step-by-Step, and Dictionary of Graphic Images. He has won numerous awards and recognition from the Society of Illustrators, AIGA and Art Directors Club. He was also awarded the Distinguished Teacher Award 2003–04 at Pratt Institute. His work is in the collections of several museums.

== Early life and education ==
Goslin was born on February 23, 1932, in Attleboro, Massachusetts, to Florence Pauline Guyot and Herbert Hyland Goslin. He is a descendant of Numa Guyot, a Swiss master engraver. Growing up, Goslin was interested in ministry and law, particularly as a defense attorney ("Clarence Darrow was a great hero of mine.") He was also interested in "calling Boston Braves baseball games." However, his main focus was in art and drawing which led him to RISD.

While at RISD, Goslin notes instructor James Pfeufer as an important influence. "Jim critiqued design projects with the utmost respect. He taught me how to value graphic design." After graduating with a BFA in 1954, Goslin declined a scholarship to Yale Graduate School. ("Great university. Lousy art school.") At the time, he was eligible for mandatory military service but was excused.

Goslin was married in 1955 to Caroline Millicent Rider for ten years.

== Career ==
Logo by Charles Goslin for a local hardware store in Park Slope, Brooklyn.

Goslin's career began at the studio of American graphic design pioneer Lester Beall in Brookfield, Connecticut (1954–1958). He worked with trademarks, corporate identity, posters, and editorial publications. He especially loved the covers of publications which he called "the designer's paintings."

After four years, he left Beall's studio to pursue freelance work. He moved to Brooklyn Heights, Brooklyn and worked with corporate identity firm Lippincott & Margulies (now known as Lippincott Mercer). Three years later, he moved to Park Slope, Brooklyn and started his own studio full-time out of his home. After a year, he was working "seven days a week and ten hours a day and turning down a third [of projects] of what came in."

As a professor, Goslin taught graphic design and illustration by assigning news clippings with real but unusual stories. The student would interpret the story or problem through a round of sketches, then produce the final work in the assigned medium (which sometimes would be left to the student. Goslin stressed the importance of exploring different ways to communicate including media like performance art or video.) He never repeated an article or story and wrote "about a thousand projects." He used news clippings because it was something he would enjoy himself. "I liked things that are specific... to work on myself... and the best place to find them was any newspaper." Occasionally, Goslin would "write a ringer" and assign the clipping unbeknownst to his students, including one example about the Roman Coliseum becoming Rome's first shopping mall.

He has inspired literally thousands of designers. His favorite projects are handing out news clippings based on strange but real stories. There's one from the New York Times about an automotive product called "Nuance" which gives interiors that "new car smell:" Design an advertisement for this pump spray invention. Or the article in the Daily News about an animal chiropractor—what would the brochure's cover for this odd practice look like? The student's job is to sketch, conceptualize and interpret, but above all, the student must communicate.

As a professional, Goslin worked alone out of his home. He found "New York [graphic design] studios... expensive" and "trashy" and preferred the simplicity of his apartment. "I work in a sitting room. And that's what I want."
