= Maree Toombs =

Australian mental health and respiratory disease researcher

Maree Toombs is a Euralayie and Kooma woman from north-western NSW and a researcher in Aboriginal and Torres Strait Islander health, particularly mental health and respiratory disease. Her work emphasises the importance of co-design, and she is editor of the book Indigenous Australians and Health: The Wombat in the Room, which guides health professionals working with Aboriginal and Torres Strait Islander Australians. She is Professor of Aboriginal and Torres Strait Islander Health in the UNSW School of Population Health, and Professor of Public Health at the University of Sydney.

== Education and career ==
Leaving school without completing Year 12, Toombs re-entered formal education through a bridging program for Aboriginal people at the University of Southern Queensland. After five years as a teacher, she returned to run the program and developed an interest in improving Aboriginal student retention rates. She completed her PhD on the wellbeing of students at university, becoming the first Aboriginal woman to graduate with a PhD from the University of Southern Queensland.

In 2019, Toombs became Associate Dean (Indigenous Engagement) in the Faculty of Medicine at the University of Queensland. A priority in this role was developing cultural humility in the Faculty so that doctors could work in culturally safe and appropriate ways thus improving health outcomes for Indigenous peoples.

In 2024, Toombs was appointed Professor of Aboriginal and Torres Strait Islander Health in the UNSW Faculty of Health and Medicine. She will work with the faculty's Aboriginal Sovereign Strategy Group to establish an Aboriginal and Torres Strait Islander Health and Wellbeing Unit, ensuring cultural safety is embedded in the Faculty's work.

== Retention of Indigenous university students ==
Toombs' PhD research explored the barriers and enablers of Indigenous student success, the social and emotional well-being of Indigenous students, students' mental health issues and how they relate to university experience, and identity and belonging at university. In 2011, she received a Churchill Fellowship to study the role resilience plays in retention rates of Indigenous students in Canadian universities. Because resilience featured strongly as an enabler of success, and in a sprit of reciprocity to her research subjects, Toombs developed a resilience training package that could be used in high schools and universities.

== The MOB van ==
In 2013, identifying a need to provide culturally appropriate primary health services to underserved Aboriginal communities, she was involved in the commissioning of a mobile clinic, the MOB (Mobile Outreach Boomerang) Van, to provide health services in the Toowoomba and Southern Darling Downs regions through Carbal Medical Services. The van has also served as an education and research facility, providing training to health professionals and a safe and private place for research data collection.

== Indigenous Suicide Intervention Skills Training (I-ASIST) protocol ==
In 2014, Toombs received funding under an NHMRC Mental Health Targeted Call for Research to develop a training program and smartphone app to prevent Indigenous youth suicide.

Applying learnings from the LivingWorks Applied Suicide Intervention Skills Training (ASIST), Toombs' team worked with almost 100 communities across Australia to develop I-ASIST, Australia's first Indigenous-led and designed suicide intervention training program. The program trains people in Aboriginal and Torres Strait Islander communities to identify people at risk of suicide and to provide appropriate support. Through two to three months of pre-training engagement with community and Elders, and ongoing support after the training, the program is tailored to community need and delivered in a culturally appropriate manner.

In 2021, Toombs was awarded a Suicide Prevention Australia Living is For Everyone (LiFE) Awards for the program, and in 2023, the Australian Mental Health Prize in the Professional category for I-ASIST. The program has also been recognised internationally, in the United States, Canada, Ireland and in African countries.

== Indigenous respiratory health ==
Toombs has also contributed to the development of co-design approaches to improve the respiratory health of Indigenous peoples through culturally safe care and the equitable distribution and prioritisation of resources. She is a contributor to the Aboriginal Children's Excellent (ACE) Lung Health Study, Kids Easy Breathing Study, examining bronchiolitis and bronchiectasis in Indigenous children, and the Aboriginal and Torres Strait Islander Partnerships to Prevent Permanent Lung Disease (APPLE) Study at the Telethon Kids Institute. She has shared advice with clinicians to enable better outcomes for lung health in Aboriginal communities.

== Awards ==
- Churchill Fellowship (2011)
- Suicide Prevention Australia LiFE Award (2021)
- Australian Mental Health Prize (Professional) (2023)
