= Mary Cannon =

Irish psychiatrist and research scientist

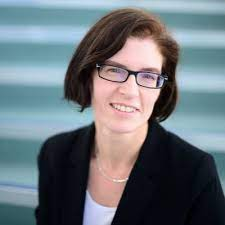
- Born: Ireland
- Education: University College Dublin (MD, PhD)
- Known for: Study of risk factors for psychosis in youth and her views on cannabis
- Children: 5 children
- Awards: Doctor Award in Psychiatry, Royal Academy of Medicine in Ireland; Clinician Scientist Award, Health Research Board
- Scientific career
- Fields: Psychiatry
- Workplaces: Royal College of Surgeons in Ireland; Beaumont Hospital, Dublin
- Website: pi.rcsi.ie/pi/marycannon/

Mary Cannon is an Irish psychiatrist, research scientist, public figure, and former member of the Cannabis Risk Alliance. She has received the Royal Academy of Medicine in Ireland's "Doctors Award" for psychiatry and is among the most highly cited scientists in the world. Cannon is known for her views on cannabis, being described as 'anti-cannabis'. She is best known in the field of psychiatry for her study of the risk factors for mental illness in young people.

== Education ==
As an undergraduate, Cannon studied medicine at University College Dublin and trained as a psychiatrist with Eadbhard O'Callaghan at the St John of God Hospital in Dublin. She then won an "advanced training fellowship" from the Wellcome Trust to study with Robin Murray at the Institute of Psychiatry in London.

Cannon cites her mother, a schoolteacher, and principal, as a possible influence: "My mother could predict which kids would have difficulties and which ones would do well", recalls Cannon. "I always found it interesting that the seeds are sown so early"."

== Career ==
Cannon is an associate professor of psychiatry at the Royal College of Surgeons in Ireland, as well as a consulting psychiatrist at Beaumont Hospital, Dublin.

Cannon researches risk factors for psychosis and other mental illnesses in young people. She and her research group have made important discoveries about the correlations of traumatic events in early childhood, including prenatal infection and childhood bullying, to psychiatric disorders such as schizophrenia in adults. Cannon also studies the mental health of Irish youth. Her group's discovery that more than one-fifth of Irish 11- to 13-year-olds have experienced "auditory hallucinations" (hearing voices) attracted significant media attention. She has expressed the desire that her findings will lessen the stigma around auditory hallucinations, and will help to "remove the boundary" between youth and adult psychiatric services and research.

== Views on cannabis ==
Cannon has published a number of studies on the health impacts of cannabis. She has a particular interest in the link between adolescent use of the substance and psychosis.

Cannon has been deeply involved in a number of Irish and international campaigns against the legalisation or decriminalisation of cannabis use.

In 2019, Mary Cannon told the Irish Times that a liberal 'cannabis agenda' is being actively 'pushed' from within the Irish Government and warned against any potential changes to Irish legislation.

Cannon was heavily involved in the New Zealand public debate around the 2020 New Zealand cannabis referendum. She wrote a piece for the New Zealand Herald in support of the 'no' campaign titled 'Cannabis is harmful to young adults and teens' in which she claimed cannabis use is linked to a loss of IQ, unemployment, school drop-out and dependence on social welfare.

During the 2020 public debate in New Zealand, Cannon collaborated with Family First New Zealand, a 'conservative Christian lobby group' in opposition to the proposed changes to New Zealand law. She appeared on Family First's official YouTube channel as part of their 'Say no to dope' campaign to discuss the harmful impacts of cannabis use in order to bolster support for a no vote on the referendum.

In 2021, Cannon received international attention after she accused Canadian actor and comedian Seth Rogan of being 'cannabis dependent' on social media platform Twitter, to which Rogan responded by saying 'cannabis use deserves to be glorified'. In 2022, TheJournal revealed through a Freedom of Information Act 2014 request that Cannon was a member of the 'anti-cannabis group' known as the 'Cannabis Risk Alliance'. TheJournal found that the group was skirting Ireland's lobbying regulations through the use of a 'loophole' which allowed them to hold 'secret meetings' with Ireland's then Minister of State with responsibility for Public Health, Well Being and the National Drugs Strategy, Frank Feighan. During one of the meetings, in which Cannon was a listed attendee, the group argued against the existence of medical cannabis, stating that it is a 'trojan horse' which 'misleads the public'.

== Recognition ==
In 2014, Cannon was the only woman among eleven Irish researchers named to the Thomson Reuters "World's Most Influential Scientific Minds" report. This report honours the 3,000 most highly cited scientists in the world.

Cannon has also won the Royal Academy of Medicine in Ireland's "Doctor Award" in Psychiatry, and the UK Health Research Board's "Clinician Scientist Award" fellowship. In 2022 she was elected a member of the Royal Irish Academy.

== Selected publications ==
- Kelleher, I; Lynch, F; Harley, M; Molloy, C; Roddy, S; Fitzpatrick, C; Cannon, M (December 2012). "Psychotic symptoms in adolescence index risk for suicidal behaviour: findings from 2 population based case-control clinical interview studies" (PDF). Archives of General Psychiatry. 69 (12): 1277–83. doi:10.1001/archgenpsychiatry.2012.164. PMID 23108974.
- Cannon, M; Clarke, MC; Cotter, D (September 2014). "Priming the brain for psychosis: maternal inflammation during fetal development and the risk of later psychiatric disorder". American Journal of Psychiatry. 171 (9): 901–5. doi:10.1176/appi.ajp.2014.14060749. PMID 25178744.
- Cannon, M (June 2012). "Hearing voices – the significance of psychotic symptoms among young people". Revista de psiquiatria y salud mental. 5 (4): 214–6. doi:10.1016/j.rpsm.2012.06.002. PMID 23021293.
- Sullivan, SA; Wiles, N; Kounali, D; Lewis, G; Heron, J; Cannon, M; Mahedy, L; Jones, PB; Stochl, J; Zammit, S (August 2014). "Longitudinal associations between adolescent psychotic experiences and depressive symptoms". PLOS ONE. 9 (8) e105758. Bibcode:2014PLoSO...9j5758S. doi:10.1371/journal.pone.0105758. PMC 4146535. PMID 25162230.
