= Michael Toombs =

American artist based in Kansas City (born 1955)

- Born: Michael Vance Toombs; 1955 (age 70–71); Kansas City, Missouri, United States
- Education: Kansas City Art Institute; Donnelly College
- Known for: Painting; Public Art; Community Murals; Interactive Arts Education
- Notable work: "Harmony on the Vine: Spill Paint Not Blood," 2016

Michael Vance Toombs (born 1955, in Kansas City, Missouri) is an American artist based in Kansas City. He is a painter, arts educator, and arts community project director. Toombs is specifically known for his interactive community murals in Kansas City, Missouri. Toombs is the founder of Storytellers Inc., an artists collective that designs and implements work with inner city youth and children in urban communities in Kansas and Missouri.

== Works ==
Several Kansas City, Missouri community projects include:

- "Harmony on the Vine: Spill Paint Not Blood," found in the atrium of the American Jazz Museum in the 18th and Vine District. The mural celebrates the history of American Jazz in Kansas City, MO.
- "Then and Now," an outdoor mural in the Ivanhoe neighborhood, celebrates four Kansas City women members on the neighborhood from the 1940s to the 1960s.;
- "Miracle on 39th, a Prospect for Change," Michael Toombs received a commendation of appreciation for this mural in the form of a Resolution from the City Council of the City of Kansas City, noting that "the Mayor, Council and Citizens of Kansas City for the organization and implementation of the project that will uplift, inspire and transform our community."

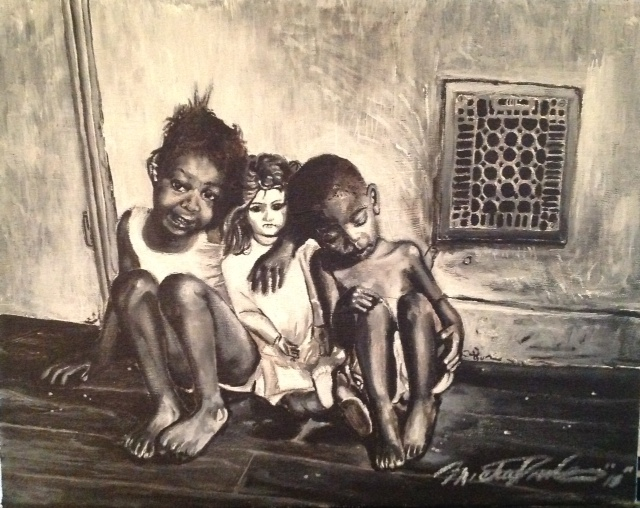
"White Doll"

== Projects ==
Toombs designed the cover art for the Kansas City Blades.

In 1992, Michael Toombs was on the panel of 3 artists to decide what artist would have the opportunity of creating a sculpture for the Kansas City Zoo.

In 1997, Toombs accompanied 7 students from Kansas City on a trip to Africa, where they painted trash barrels and gave them to the capital city of Ouagadougou to be placed on street corners. This is the city's first attempt at establishing a method for trash collection.

In 2000, Toombs coordinated with 600 elementary school students to create a mural at Benninghoven Elementary School titled "Cultural Haven."

In 2002, Toombs started a project that acknowledges the growing number of homicides in Kansas City. On the roof of an office building, he arranged 30 illuminated, angelic figures. Whenever there are reports of a homicide, one of the lightbulbs inside a figure will be extinguished.

In 2016, he started a project called "Teens in Transition," which gave teens the opportunity to be part of a team and to learn the value of self-expression. Within the first year of the program, crime rates in the area had dropped by 18%. The Kansas City Mayor at the time promised Michael Toombs $60,000 to do it again and create another group. The second time he did it, he reached out to court prosecutors to identify teens with the worst juvenile records. He compensated them out of his own pocket as an incentive to keep returning each week within the 8-week program.

In 2018, he led a team of nearly 30 professional artists in creating the Brown v. Board Mural Project: Legacy & Vision. This massive mural is located across the street from Monroe School, which is part of the Brown v. Board National Historical Park. The mural project was organized by Topeka-based nonprofit, ArtsConnect. More information about this project is found at https://artstopeka.org/mural/bvb.

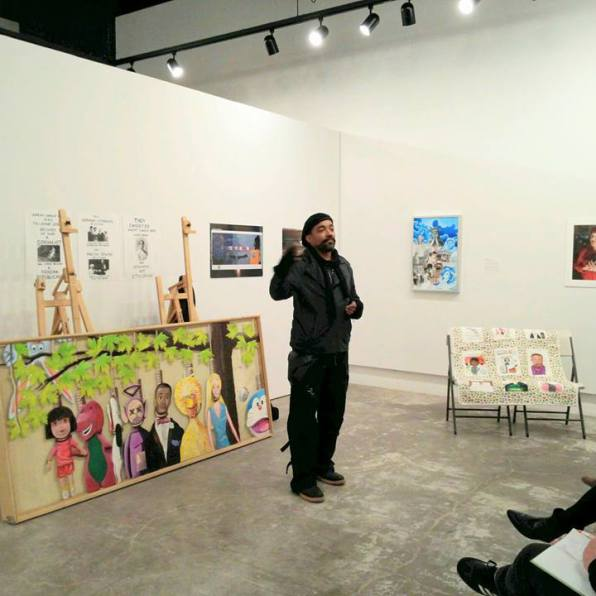
Michael Toombs giving a talk at a local gallery in Kansas City, Missouri

== Community Contributions ==
In interviews, Toombs describes himself as growing up in the urban core of Kansas City and the influence of art in his life as a person of color. During his career as a professional artist, he developed art activities programs for teens identified through court programs currently funded by the Mayor of Kansas City and the No Violence Alliance with the Prosecutor's Office, Jackson County, Missouri. Toombs has an artist's file deposited with The Spencer Art Reference Library, at the Nelson-Atkins Museum of Art. Toombs also participated in the 2017 Juneteenth Celebration at the Nelson-Atkins Museum of Art, where he talked to visitors about his murals and Juneteenth as a whole.

== Storytellers, Inc ==
Michael Toombs founded Storytellers, Inc, a non-profit multicultural, multimedia arts organization that provides local Kansas City artists with new venues and educate those artists on how to re-sensitize at-risk youth through the arts.

== Awards and recognitions ==
Michael Toombs won the Award for Distinguished Service in 2003.
