= The Spencer Art Reference Library =

Spencer Art Reference Library
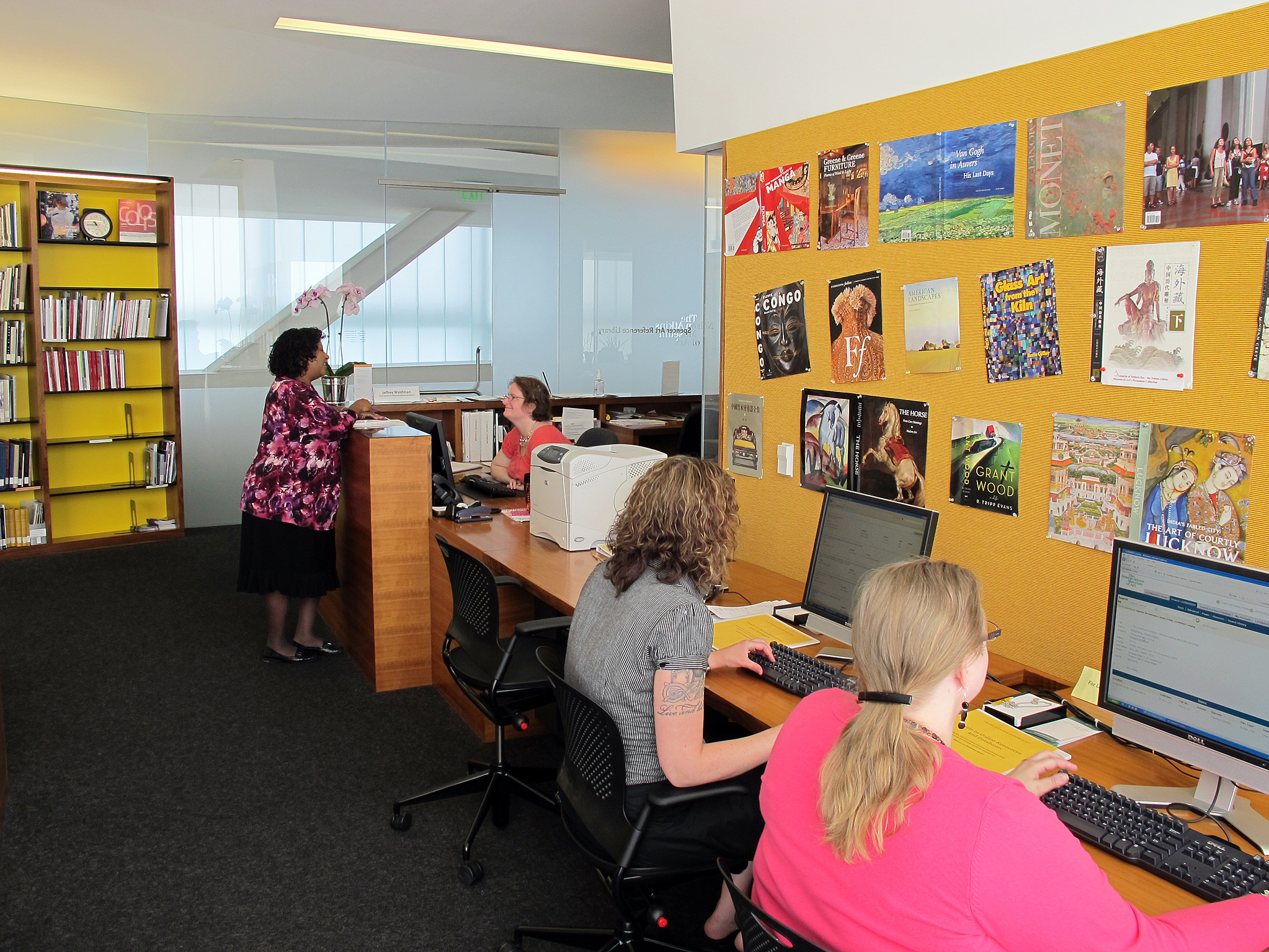
- Spencer Art Reference Library Reading Room
- 39.0449664°N 94.5809582°W
- Location: Kansas City, Missouri
- Type: special library (visual arts)
- Established: 1962

Collection
- Size: 264,000

Access and use
- Circulation: 2,500 transactions

Other information
- Director: Marilyn Carbonell
- Website: nelson-atkins.org/library/

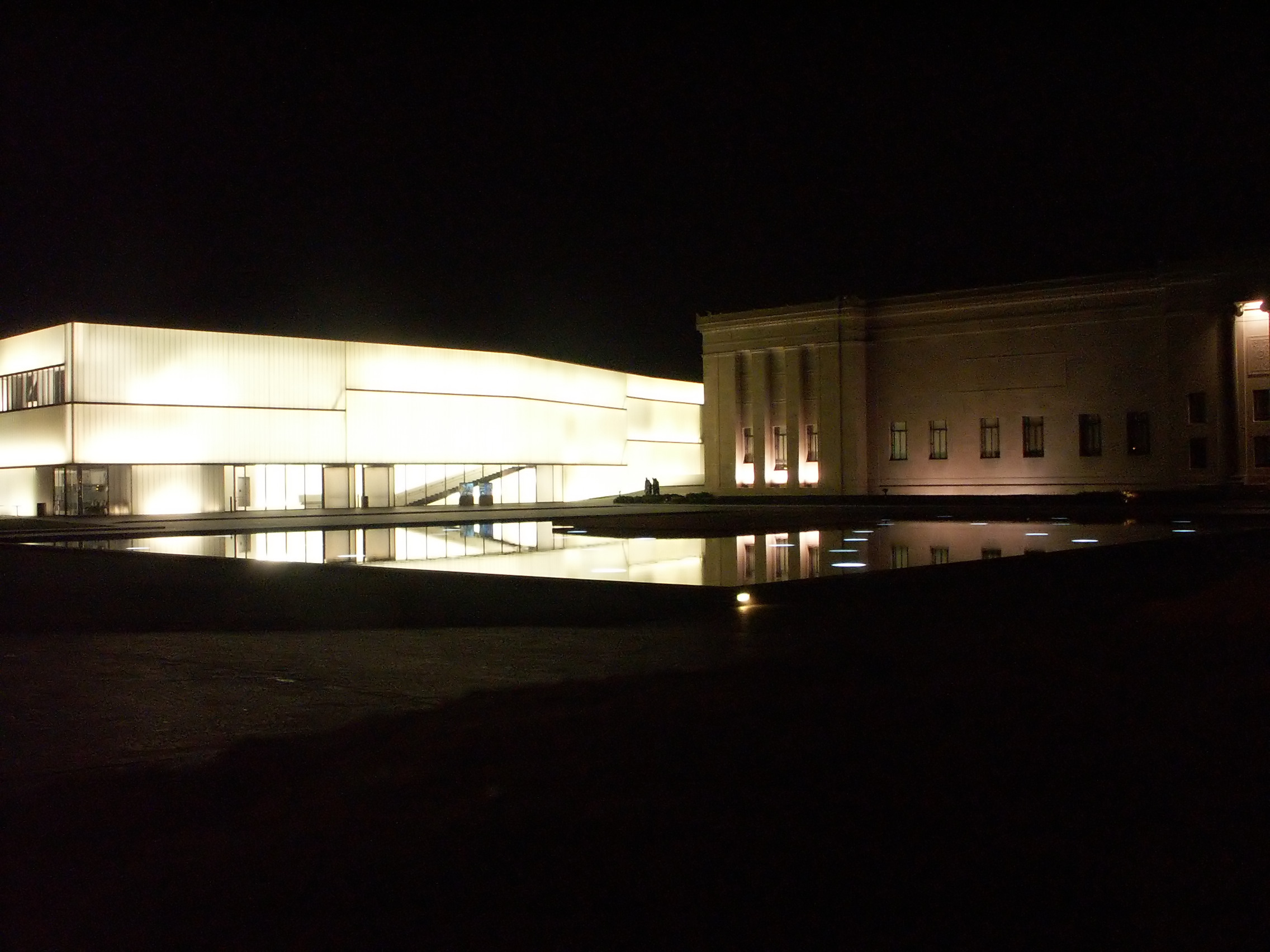
The library is housed on the second floor of the Bloch Building

The Spencer Art Reference Library (SARL) is a library housed in the Bloch Building of the Nelson-Atkins Museum of Art in Kansas City, Missouri, in the United States. Its collection of over 290,000 visual arts related resources support the work of the museum.

== Architecture ==
Plans for a library were included in the original design for the Nelson-Atkins Museum of Art, however, the Kenneth and Helen Spencer Art Reference Library did not officially open until 1962. The library's growing collection necessitated an expansion in 1977 which was led by Helen Spencer. The library was again expanded in June 2007 as part of the Bloch Building expansion led by architect Steven Holl.

== Collection ==
The library's collection currently holds 264,000 volumes covering the history of art and other topics to support the museum's art collections. In addition to books, the library provides access to arts journals, auction price indexes, online art research resources. Access to these collections is provided via the library's online catalog.

== Services ==
The library operates as reference library to members of the public, as well as a service to museum staff. It provides reference assistance in person, by email and phone. For teachers and college faculty members, the library supports personal learning/research goals in the visual arts. The library also hosts educational events including

- Browse, Doodle, Chat & Create: Hosted in partnership with Third Thursday, participants use the resources in the library for their personal creative explorations.
- Explore the Hidden Life of your Objects: Participants use the materials available in the library to explore their own personal artifacts through photos of the objects they bring in.
- Natural Inspirations: KC's Artists Inspired by Nature: A discussion with a panel of local Kansas City artists who are featured in the Artist File Initiative. Each one of their creative processes is inspired by nature.

== The Archives ==
The library hosts the Nelson-Atkins Museum of Art archives which include correspondence, memoranda, and other records relating to the building, staffing and development of the collections of the museum, the Nelson Gallery Foundation and related organizations. Among these major record groups and collections are the William Rockhill Nelson Trust Records, the Paul Gardner Papers, the Director's Office Records, the Laurence Sickman Papers and the Friends of Art Records. Various administrative and curatorial records are held in the archives as well, which include documentation of the museum's acquisitions, exhibitions, and educational programs.

== Artists' File Initiative ==
The Artist File Initiative was established in 2015 by Marilyn Carbonell, the Head of Library Services. Carbonell works with Kansas City artists documenting the careers of the creative community to preserve their legacy. The files are cataloged in the library.
