= Alex F. Yaworski =

American/Ukrainian visual artist

Alex F Yaworski
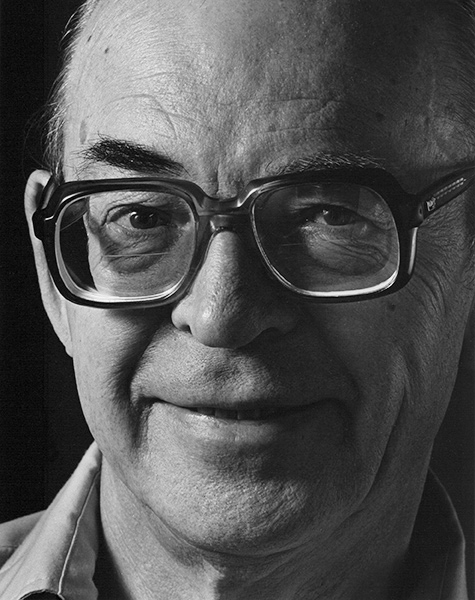
- Black and White Portrait of Alex F. Yaworski in 1980
- Born: December 27, 1907; Odessa, Ukraine, Imperial Russia
- Died: March 25, 1997 (aged 89); Kansas City, Missouri, U.S.
- Citizenship: United States, Other?
- Occupation: Artist
- Years active: 50
- Spouse: Maurine Bell Yaworski
- Children: Ernine Kratsch Astolfi (Stepdaughter), Don Yaworski (Son)
- Parents: Anthony (Anton) Yaworski (father); Anna Zupkova Yaworski (mother)
- Relatives: Nicholas Yaworski, Edward Yaworski, Tony Yaworski, William Yaworski, Sophie Yaworski Sharpe Fay, Helen Yaworski Dobrovich

Alex F. Yaworski (December 27, 1907 – March 25, 1997) was an American visual artist who specialized in Watercolor painting and Illustration.

== Early life ==
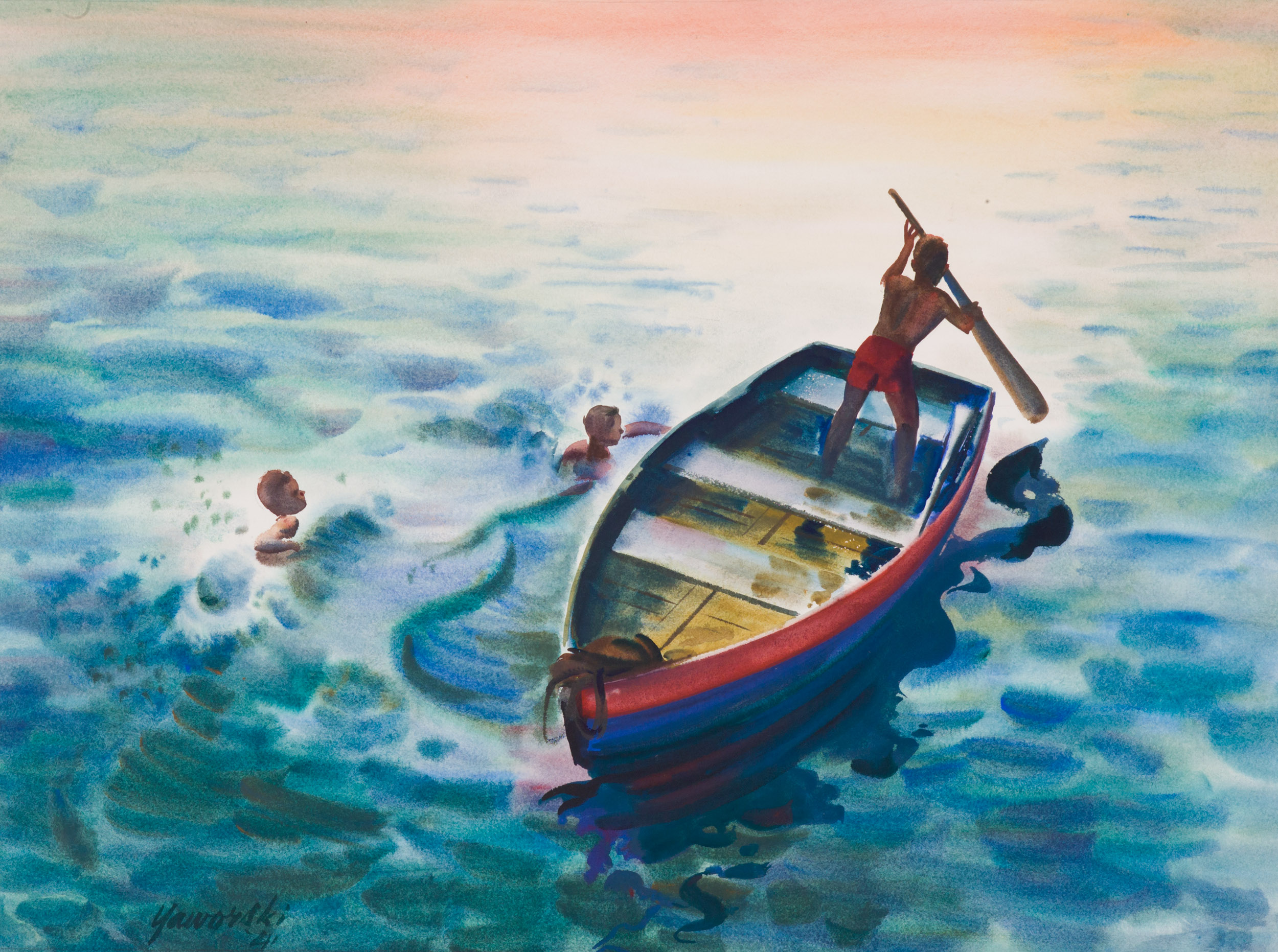
Summertime by Alex F. Yaworski, 1941

Alex F. Yaworski's parents, Anton and Anna, married right before the Russo-Japanese War of 1904-1905. His father, Anton, was conscripted into the Czarist Army and maintained cavalry horses, while his mother, Anna was employed as a cook for a group of generals. Alex was born December 27, 1907. They immigrated to the United States through Canada when Alex was almost two years old and settled in Superior, Wisconsin During his lifetime, Superior and environs were the subject matter of many of his paintings. He found fascination in the Northern Wisconsin scenic beauty as well as the waterfront shipyards, freight yards, and grain elevators of the Duluth/Superior Twin Ports region. As early as grade school, he was determined to become an artist. In 1927, he left Superior for Chicago, Illinois to attend The American Academy of Art. He graduated in 1931. He taught life drawing while still a student and continued teaching there for a period of time after graduation.

== Career ==
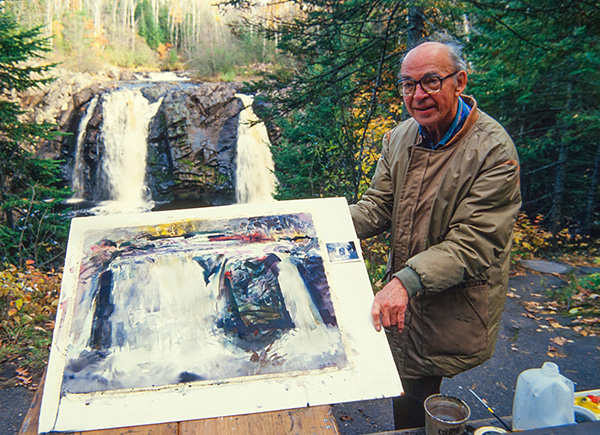
Alex F. Yaworski at Little Manitou Falls, Pattison Park, WI

Yaworski's first full-time job out of school was working in the art department of the Chicago Tribune. After a few years as an employee of the Tribune, he became a freelance artist and worked for Sears Roebuck and other clients. In the 1940s, he again became a full-time employee but this time for Poster Products in Chicago. While there during World War II, Alex illustrated many posters and advertisements for the war bond effort. After the war, he returned to freelancing for multiple companies. From 1946 through 1954, he designed and illustrated Sears Roebuck's Christmas Book covers.

== Personal life ==
Alex was doing work for Sears Roebuck when he met his then-to-be wife Maurine who was working in their advertising department. She already had a daughter named Ernine from her previous marriage. Together, they formed a family of three when they got married in June, 1936 and had son Don twelve years later. Maurine died in 1983 and in 1991 after spending over 60 years in Chicago, Alex moved to Kansas City, MO to be closer to his son. In his final years, he continued to paint and he enjoyed his visits to the Nelson-Atkins Museum of Art. Alex F. Yaworski died on March 25, 1997.

== Notable Mentions ==
- Featured in "Seascapes and Landscapes in Watercolor" edited by Norman Kent, Watson-Guptill, 1956
- Included in articles featured in "American Artists Magazine," a Watson-Guptill publication
- Featured in "Acrylic Watercolor Painting" by Wendon Blake, 1970, ISBN 0-8230-4640-0
- Featured in Watson-Guptill book "Watercolorists at Work," by Susan E. Meyer and Norman Kent, 1972, ISBN 0-8230-5690-2
- Cited in Book, "One Hundred Years, 1887-1987:Catalog of the Collection, Union League Club of Chicago" by Dennis J. Loy and Caroline Honig, 1987, LCCN 7-81198
- Included in the book "Watercolor: Let the Medium Do It" by Valfred Thelin and Patricia Burlin, Watson-Guptill, 1988, ISBN 0-8230-5667-8, CIP 88-21061
- Included in the book "Handmade Holiday Cards from 20th Century Artists" from the Collections of the Smithsonian's Archives of American Art, by Mary Savig, Smithsonian Books, 2012, ISBN 978-1-58834-330-7

== Juror ==
- 97th Annual Exhibition of the American Watercolor Society, New York, NY, 1964
- 49th Annual Hoosier Salon, Indianapolis, Indiana, 1973
- Adirondacks National Exhibition of American Watercolors, Old Forge, NY, 1984
- MidSouthern Watercolorists in Little Rock, Arkansas, 1974
- Midwest Watercolor Society in Manitowoc, Wisconsin, 1978
- Midwest Watercolor Society in Duluth, Minnesota, 1979
- Iowa Watercolor Society in Des Moines, Iowa, 1981
- 51st Annual Indiana Artists Club, Indianapolis, Indiana, 1983

== Honors and awards ==
- The Dagmar Haagstrom Tribble Purchase Prize for the American Watercolor Society
- The Emily Goldsmith Award for the American Watercolor Society
- Container Corporation Award for the Artists Guild of Chicago
- Naomi Lorne Memorial Award for the American Watercolor Society
- Honorary membership in the Artists Guild of Chicago
- Watercolor USA Purchase Award
- Watercolor USA Honor Society
- The Grumbacher Hyplar Award for the National Society of Painters in Casein and Acrylic
- The Gold Award for Calendars for The Graphic Arts Association
- Honorable Mention for the National Society of Painters in Casein and Acrylic
- Union League Artist Member Award for the Union League Civic & Arts Foundation
- Adirondack Wilderness Medal for the Adirondacks National Exhibition of American Watercolors
- Frank W. Chesrow Gold Medal for the Municipal Art League of Chicago
- Life member status in the American Watercolor Society
- Award of Excellence for Outstanding Achievement in Fine Art, Municipal Art League of Chicago
- AFY File included in the Artists File Initiative at the Spencer Art Reference Library, Nelson-Atkins Museum of Art, Kansas City, Missouri

== Sources ==
- "One Hundred Years, 1887-1987: Catalog of the Collection, Union League Club of Chicago," by Dennis J. Loy, Caroline Honig, 1987, LCCN 87-81198
