= REDress Project =

Public art installation

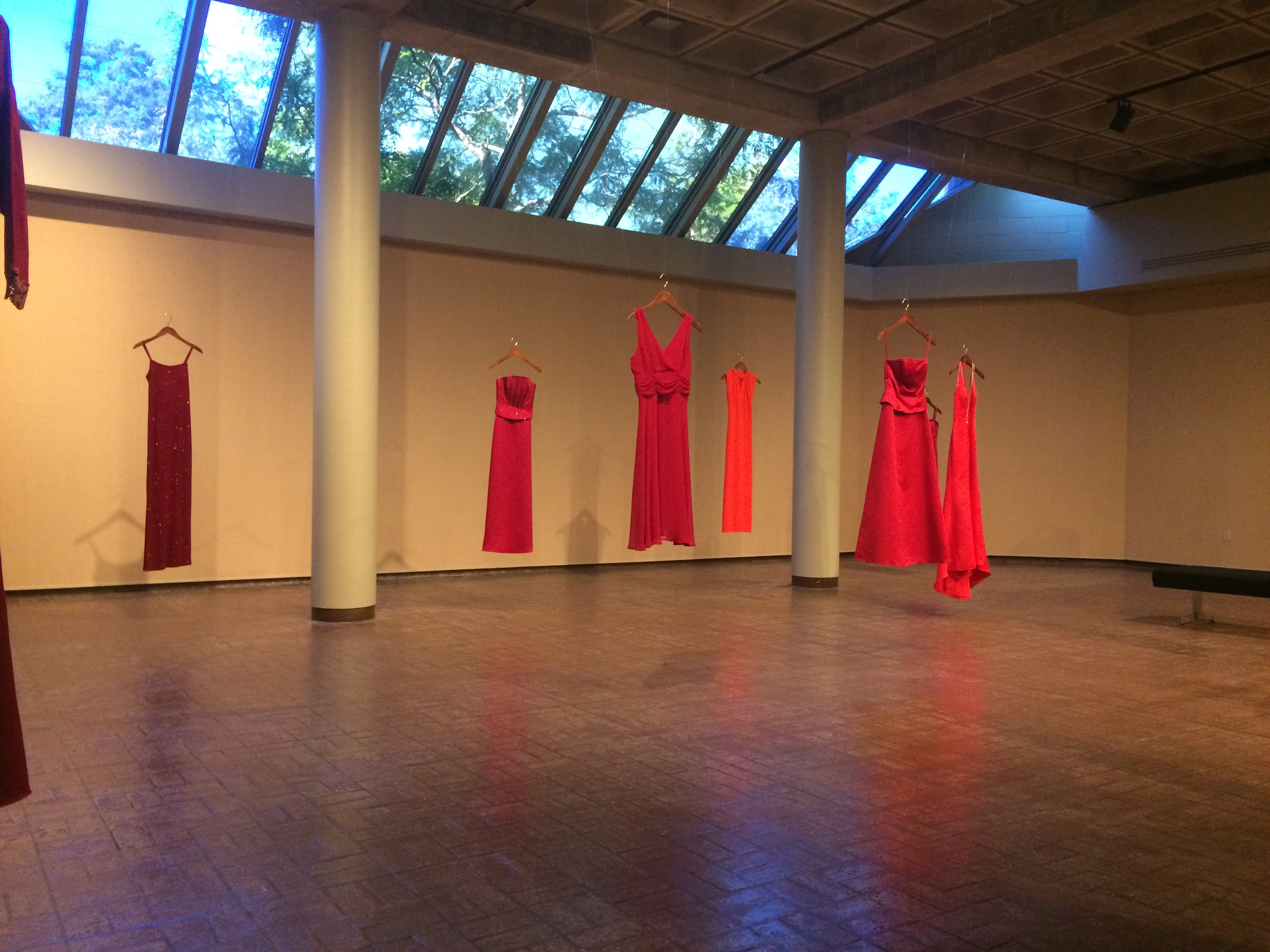
The REDress Project at Acadia University in 2015.

The REDress Project by Jaime Black is a public art installation that was created in response to the missing and murdered Indigenous women (MMIW) epidemic in Canada and the United States. The ongoing project began in 2010 and commemorates missing and murdered indigenous women from the First Nations, Inuit, Métis (FNIM), and Native American communities by hanging empty red dresses in a range of environments. The project has also inspired other artists to use red to draw attention to the issue of MMIW, and prompted the creation of Red Dress Day.

== Background ==
Jaime Black is Métis, an ethnic group native to parts of Canada and the United States of America, which traces their descent to both indigenous North Americans and Western European settlers. Black was working at the Urban Shaman Contemporary Aboriginal Art gallery in Winnipeg when she attended a conference in Germany. She heard Jo-Ann Episkenew speak about the hundreds of missing and murdered women in Canada.

Black proposed to include a display of red dresses in a workshop at the University of Winnipeg’s Institute for Women’s and Gender Studies. Black says the image of an empty red dress hanging outside came to her whilst listening to Episkenew speak, but has since identified an influence from the book cover of Métis author Maria Campbell's novel The Book of Jessica. The university agreed with Black's proposal, and helped her source the dresses.

To date more than 400 dresses have been donated by women across Canada. Families of missing or murdered women have contributed dresses, and attended some of the exhibitions.

== Symbolism ==
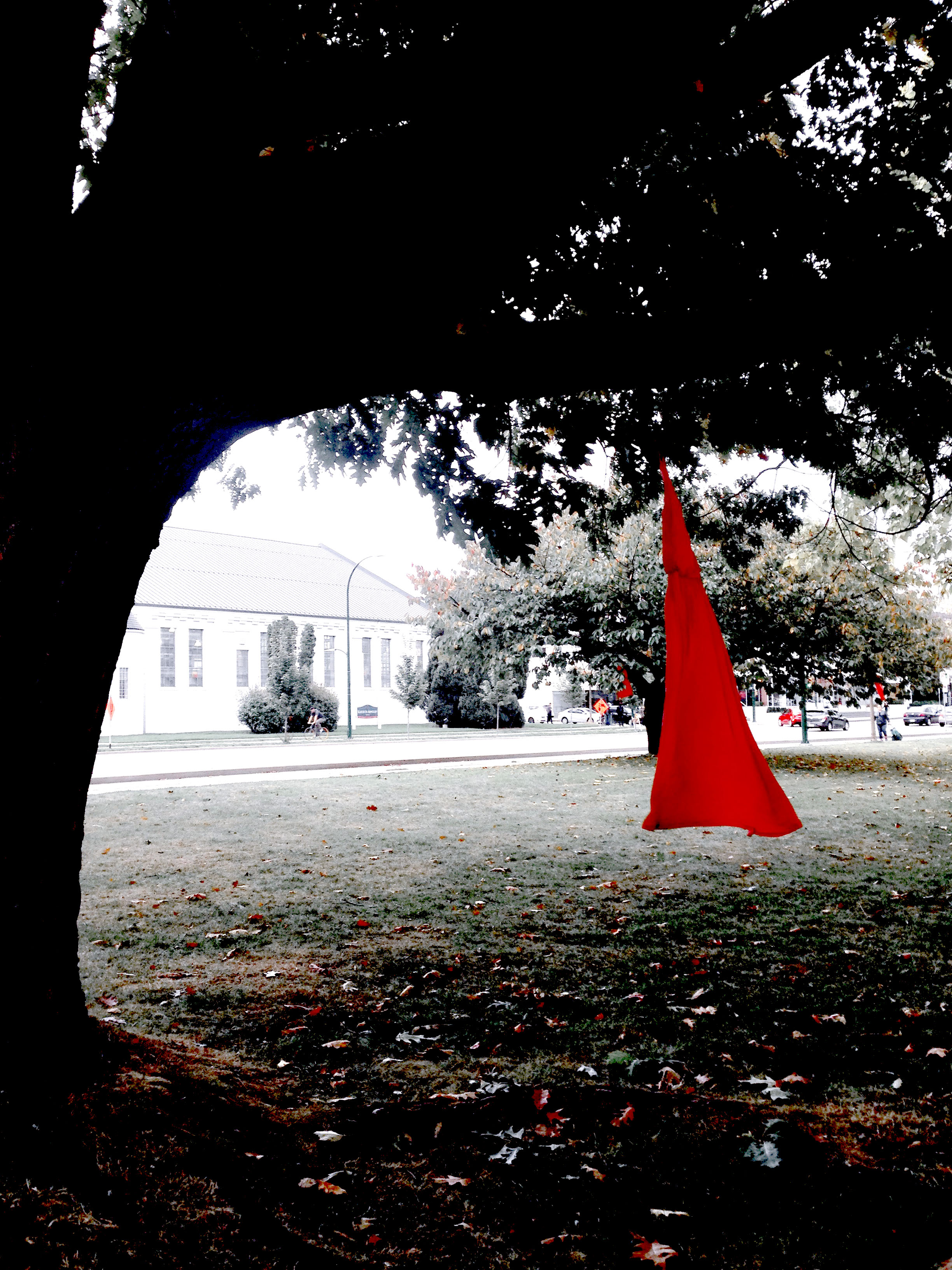
Art installation inspired by Métis artist Jaime Black at Seaforth Peace Park, Vancouver, Canada on the National Day for Vigils for Missing and Murdered Indigenous Women 2016.

Black chose the colour red after conversations with an indigenous friend, who told her red is the only colour the spirits can see. "So (red) is really a calling back of the spirits of these women and allowing them a chance to be among us and have their voices heard through their family members and community". Black has also suggested red "relates to our lifeblood and that connection between all of us", and that it symbolises both vitality and violence.

The dresses are empty, so that they evoke the missing women who should be wearing them. Black has said: "People notice there is a presence in the absence".

Whilst some installations of the dresses have been indoors, the preferred space for the installation is outdoors. When outside, the dresses interact with nature, drawing the eye of passersby and introducing them to the MMIW issue through information panels. Some critics feel the installation is more powerful in natural environments, but others have highlighted the impact within the urban environment in emphasising this is not purely a rural issue.

== Notable installations ==
The installation has been exhibited in more than 31 locations around Canada, and varies based on location. In 2019, it had its first exhibition in the United States of America. Notable installations include:

- March 2011: first exhibition at The University of Winnipeg.
- May 2011: the Manitoba Legislature.
- October 2013: one floor of the Ecocentrix exhibition in the Bargehouse gallery, OXO Tower, London, was given over to the dresses.
- 2014: Canadian Museum for Human Rights, where several dresses are now part of the permanent display.
- 4 October 2015: Black asks women across Canada to display red dresses in their homes, businesses or public spaces as an act of support on National Day of Vigils to Remember Murdered and Missing Aboriginal Women.
- March 2019: Smithsonian's National Museum of the American Indian, with 35 dresses outside the building.

== Influence on others ==
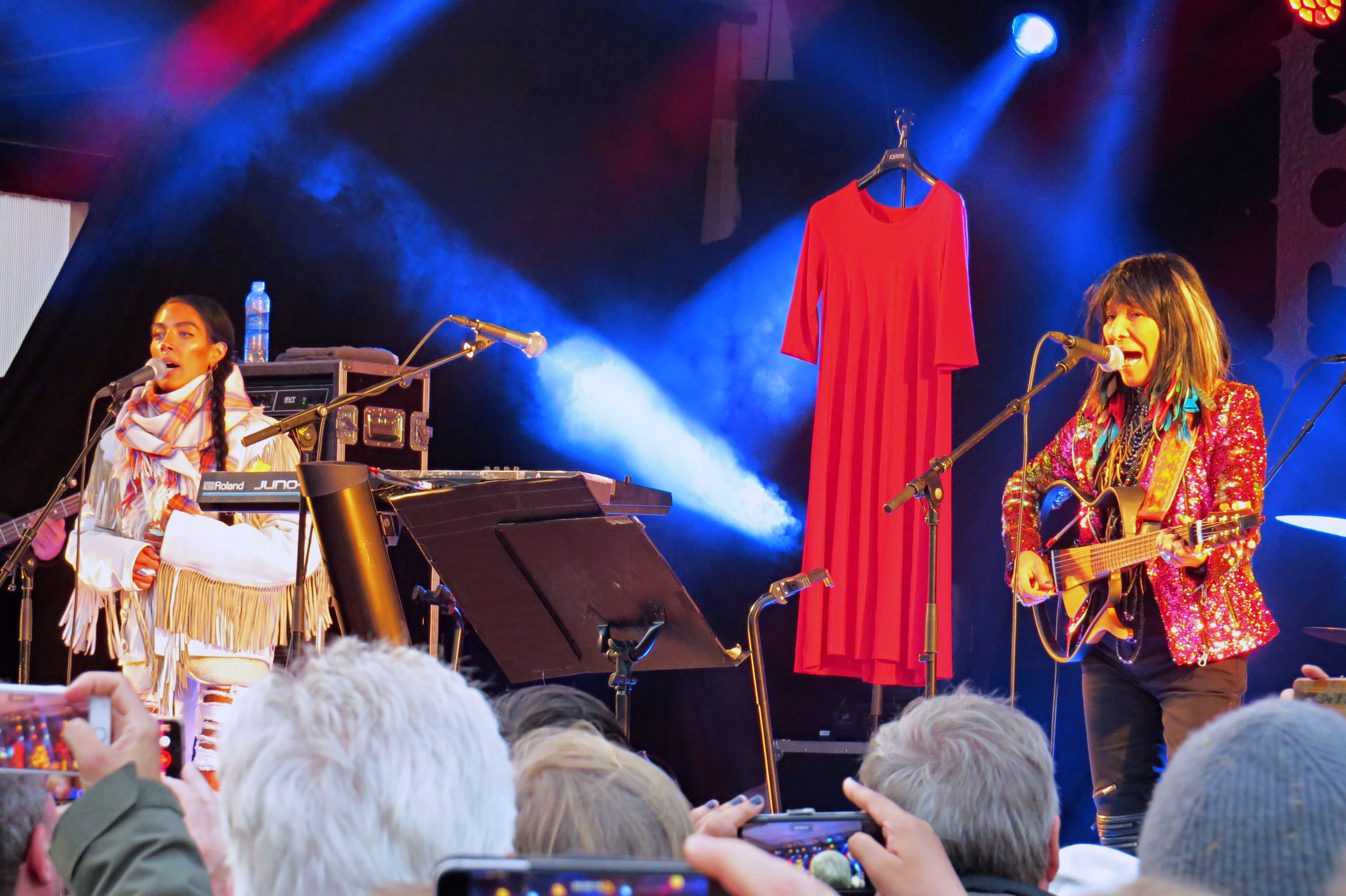
Maxida Märak and Buffy Sainte-Marie at Riddu Riđđu 2019

In 2017, 17-year-old Cree jingle dancer Tia Wood asked other dancers at the Gathering of Nations Powwow where she was serving Head Young Lady Dancer to wear red as part of a special, old-style jingle dance, which is a type of healing dance, out of respect for missing and murdered indigenous women and to raise awareness of the epidemic. The Red Dress Jingle Special she organised has continued to be presented at pow-wows ever since.

A Mi’kmaq woman by the name of Sasha Doucette photographs pieces of red clothing in her hometown of Eskasoni. Originally, she placed red dresses for the women and red ribbon shirts for the men at the sites where they have been murdered, but she has also started doing the same for people who have not died of violence, but whose deaths could have been otherwise prevented.

In 2018, Isabella Aiukli Cornell, a member of the Choctaw Nation, chose to wear a custom-made dress made by Crow designer Della Bighair-Stump of Hardin, Montana to her junior prom in order to bring attention to the systemic violence and abuse indigenous women suffer. “The color red is symbolic of the Missing and Murdered Indigenous Women’s movement,” Cornell said. “The bodice was made to incorporate a little bit of the (Choctaw) tribe by adding diamonds to the design.” Cornell donated her prom dress and shoes to the Smithsonian National Museum of American History.

Buffy Sainte-Marie has been inspired by the project to hang a single red dress up on stage at her concerts. In July 2019, Buffy Sainte-Marie, Tanya Tagaq, and Maxida Märak prominently displayed a single red dress on stage when they performed together at Riddu Riđđu.

== Associated campaigns ==
- AmINext
- Idle No More
- Walking With Our Sisters

== See also ==
- Jaime Black
