= Indigenous English in Canada =

Varieties of English dialects used by the Indigenous peoples of Canada

Indigenous English, also known as First Nations English (FNE), refers to varieties of English used by the Indigenous peoples of Canada. These many varieties are a result of the many Indigenous languages present in Canada and reflect the linguistic diversity of the country.

Some identified trends of FNE dialects are ‘irregular’ pronoun use, differences in verbal inflection, and differences in rhythmic patterning. Differences in FNE dialects can be largely attributed to the influence of the structure and traits of different Indigenous languages.

For example, Plains Cree has fewer phonological contrasts than the English language, has no voicing contrast, and does not contain liquids or several fricatives that are found in English. Consequently, a smaller phonetic inventory tends to be present in speakers of Plains Cree English than those who speak with a Standard Canadian English dialect. On another hand, Dene Suline has more phonological contrast than English, which may influence the use of linguistic features in Dene Suline English which are not present in standard Canadian English, two features in particular being creaky voice and lateralization of sibilants. While more research is necessary to clarify the connections between FN languages, English, and FNE dialects, there is a clear relationship between the FN languages and the FNE dialects. Influences from other languages, mainly French, are also present in shaping pidgin, creole, and FNE dialects in Canada.

While diverse, many FNE dialects come from similar language families and these may be cross referenced once they are identified. Additionally, there is a suggestion that FNE dialects reveal a shared cultural history, in ways which differ from that of the English and Indigenous languages present in Canada. Based on the current research of English dialects used by First Nations, it appears that there are many features shared by FNE dialects, a connection which may reflect a shared social history of periods of time in which peoples of different languages and English dialects lived together while these dialects were formed and refined, with residential schools being one such example of this. The literature reveals that there are also traits present across many FNE dialects which are not attributable to transfer from any heritage language (Indigenous, English, French, or other), further confirming roles that a collective social history may have played in the formation of these dialects.

Some analyses have concluded that contemporary Indigenous Canadian English may represent the late stages of a decreolization process among peoples who historically spoke more creolized or pidginized forms of English. Since the 1990s, the use of the "non-standard" dialects has been poorly perceived by the non-Aboriginal majority, as evidenced by mockery and discrimination. Some features of the dialects, for example, may have led aboriginal children to be wrongly diagnosed as having a speech impairment or a learning disability. Academics have begun to recommend that Canadian schools accept Indigenous varieties of English as valid English and as a part of Indigenous culture. Recognition of FNE dialects helps highlight and celebrate Indigenous identity in the Canadian context.

There are relatively few written works that appear in Indigenous English dialects. One account is Maria Campbell's book Stories of the Road Allowance People, a collection of Métis folktales. An example from that work illustrates the type of speech used by Elders in rural Métis communities during her research, with some stories being collected in Cree or other languages and translated into dialectical English by Campbell:

Dere wasen very much he can steal from dah table anyways
'cept da knives and forks.
An Margareet he knowed he wouldn dare take dem
cause dat woman you know
hees gots a hell of a repetation for being a hardheaded woman
when he gets mad.

Dat man he have to be a damn fool to steal from hees table. - Dah Teef

== See also ==
- Australian Aboriginal English
- American Indian English
