= Jaime Black =

Indigenous Canadian Artist

- Born: Thunder Bay, Ontario
- Known for: Installation Art Projects, Photography, Sculpture, Immersive Film and Video, and Performance Art Practices
- Notable work: REDress Project
- Website: https://www.jaimeblackartist.com/

Jaime Black is a Canadian Red River Métis multidisciplinary artist and activist of Anishinaabe and Finnish descent.

Her work focuses on First Nations and Indigenous representation and identity. Black is best known for the REDress Project, an art installation that she created as a response to the Missing and Murdered Indigenous Women (MMIW) crisis in Canada as well as in the United States.

Black centers her creative practice on Indigenous womanhood and the effects of colonization on Indigenous peoples in North America. Her art has brought significant attention to the continued violence against Indigenous women. Notably, The REDress project has received recognition from the Canadian government, with a national holiday, Red Dress Day which is focused on commemorating MMIW.

== Early life ==
Jaime Black was born in Thunder Bay, Ontario, and later moved to Regina, Saskatchewan. At age 12, Black's family moved to Winnipeg, Manitoba, where she continues to live today.

== Education ==
Black studied English literature at the University of Manitoba, earning a Bachelor of Arts in Literature and Native Studies in 2004. In 2008, she received a degree in education from the Ontario Institute for Studies in Education at the University of Toronto.

Following her studies, Black taught at the Opaskwayak Cree Nation in The Pas, Manitoba, and developed an art curriculum for the Urban Shaman, an aboriginal artist-run center in Winnipeg. As an educator, Black developed art curricula for schools while involving herself in local writing groups near her home. In addition, Black is a mentor associated with the Mentoring Artists for Women's Art group. Today, she continues to work in various capacities for groups that focus on education and Indigenous rights.

== Impact ==
In 2019, during a talk at the Safety for Our Sisters: Ending Violence Against Native Women Symposium in Washington D.C, Black commented that when people view Indigenous women in red dresses, she wants them to understand that “we are wearing these dresses, and our power is still real. We are going to reclaim it.”

Since 2010, May 5 is recognized as Red Dress Day in Canada, where citizens are encouraged to hold grieving ceremonies, display red dresses in public spaces, and wear the colour red in solidarity with the Missing and Murdered Indigenous Women (MMIW) movement.

In 2016, Mi’kmaq artist Sasha Doucette photographed red dresses and shirts at locations where dead bodies of aboriginal men and women were found in her community of Eskasoni Mi'kmaw Nation in Nova Scotia. Doucette uses social media to share her visualization of violence towards Indigenous community members.

Two high school students, Trinity Harry and Joseph Ginter spent over 300 hours in 2018 welding a red dress sculpture- crediting Jamie Black as their inspiration.

At the 2019 Vancouver Indigenous Fashion Week, a group of Indigenous designers honored Missing and Murdered Indigenous Women (MMIW) by featuring the color red in their collections.

In the U.S. House of Representatives hearing on MMIW in 2021, then New Mexico Representative Deb Haaland wore red to honour Missing and Murdered Indigenous Women.

== Artistic career ==
=== Influences ===
Black's artwork explores themes of memory, identity, place, and resistance, rooted in an understanding of the body and land as vital sources of cultural and spiritual knowledge. Her works have mainly been influenced by other Indigenous women. Particularly, her inspiration started on missing and murdered Indigenous women in Canada when she cited a presentation by Jo-Ann Episkenew at a conference in Germany.

In 2009, Black witnessed a performance in Bogota, Colombia where 300 women whose family members were murdered or had gone missing gathered in the public square to draw attention to the problem. During this performance, 40 women in red dresses performed a choreographed dance while shouting the names of their missing family members. Black was inspired by the public nature of the performance and aimed to channel that energy to make the critical matter of Missing and Murdered Indigenous Women in Canada visible both inside and outside gallery walls.

In a 2017 interview with Toronto Life, she credited the book cover of Maria Campbell’s The Book of Jessica, which features a single red dress, as a subconscious influence on The REDress Project.

=== Major works ===
==== 2010: REDress Project ====
The REDress Project is a public art installation launched in 2010 aimed at bringing awareness to the epidemic of Missing and Murdered Indigenous Women (MMIW) girls, transgender and two-spirit persons in Canada. Themes of feminism and Indigenous social justice are highlighted. The installation features empty red dresses displayed in public and land based spaces, symbolizing the violence faced by Indigenous women and serving as a reminder of those who are missing or have been murdered. Despite representing only 4% of Canada's population, Indigenous women account for 16% of all homicides, a disparity highlighted by the Canadian Government's National Inquiry into Missing and Murdered Indigenous Women and Girls. Black's REDress Project acts as a direct response to these extreme rates of violence.The REDress Project is an initiative designed to address and challenge dehumanizing narratives about Aboriginal women by drawing attention to both their presence and absence within societal discourse. It seeks to highlight issues of invisibility, as demonstrated by insufficient police protection and governmental inaction, while advocating for the amplification of Indigenous women's voices. By resisting imposed silence, the project serves as a mechanism for raising awareness and fostering dialogue on these critical issues.She describes this work as having a spiritual quality, suggesting it serves to call back the spirits of the women represented, allowing their stories to be told and remembered, thus promoting reflection and healing within affected communities.

The project engages local communities by collecting red dresses for the installations and has garnered widespread recognition, being exhibited in various locations, including the National Museum of the American Indian at the Smithsonian Institution in Washington, D.C. Additionally, it has inspired other artists to address MMIW through the use of red and contributed to the establishment of Red Dress Day, a day of remembrance for First Nations, Inuit, Métis, and Native American communities.

==== 2025: Art, Action, and the Power of Presence ====
The book titled "Art, Action, and the Power of Presence", is set for release in spring 2025. This anthology brings together the voices of Indigenous women, Elders, grassroots community activists, artists, academics, and family members impacted by the crisis of Missing and Murdered Indigenous Women, Girls, and Two-Spirit (MMIWG2S) people across Turtle Island. Black shares personal stories and reflections from her REDress Project alongside the contributions of others, using their collective voices to advocate for justice and honour Indigenous women as guardians of land, culture, and community.

=== Video ===
==== 2020: When Land and Body Merge ====
"When Land and Body Merge" is an 8-minute 34-second video created by artists Jaime Black and Lindsay Delaronde. This experimental performance piece explores themes of body, environment, nature, Indigenous identity, landscape, sustainability, and women's work. Black and Delaronde, who live in distant territories—Lekwungen Territory and Treaty One Territory—engaged in a collaborative process that reflects their shared connection to the land despite geographical and cultural differences. Over a two-month period, the artists worked remotely, exchanging creative responses through video and writing, which allowed them to build a relationship across distances. The project treats their respective territories as a third collaborator, integrating diverse languages, ceremonies, and traditions in an exploration of land stewardship and connection. "When Land and Body Merge" was produced in Manitoba and British Columbia and was showcased at four festivals: the Gimme Some Truth Documentary Film Festival, Gimli Film Festival in Manitoba, Dawson City International Short Film Festival, and the Art Gallery of Hamilton Film Festival.

==== 2021: Waawiyebii’ige: She Draws a Circle ====
“Waawiyebii’ige: She Draws a Circle” is a 4-minute 50-second video created by artists Jaime Black and Niklas Konowal. This experimental work reflects on the contributions of generations of women striving to break violence and oppression cycles. By exploring the spiritual connections to land and community, the piece emphasizes regenerative healing and the importance of shedding light hidden struggles to support future generations. Produced in Manitoba, “She Draws a Circle” spans themes of Indigenous identity, activism, decolonization, spirituality, body, culture, community, landscape, and resistance. It has been featured at the Gimli Film Festival in Manitoba, Asinabka Film and Media Arts Festival, ImagineNative Film & Media Art Festival, Vidéos de femmes dans le parc (GIV), and Planet in Focus.

=== Photography ===
==== 2016-2017: Conversations with the Land/We Are the Land ====
"Conversations with the Land/We Are the Land" is a series of photographs exploring themes of identity, memory, land, and strength. Black depicts scenes of Indigenous women and nature to express the connection between Indigenous people and the land. This collection has been featured multiple times independently and also shown in connection with The REDress project.

==== 2020: Reimmersion ====
“Reimmersion” is a photographic series that portrays Indigenous women submerged in water. Through these images, Black explores the healing significance of water in Indigenous cultures and emphasizes its ongoing importance to Indigenous sovereignty and security. The series reflects water's role as a source of renewal and a symbol of resilience and cultural continuity.

==== 2020: Casting ====
“Casting” is a single photograph featuring a white dress submerged underwater, created by artist Jaime Black. While Black has expressed uncertainty about the piece's specific meaning, she emphasizes that an essential part of her artistic practice involves the act of creation itself, allowing meaning to emerge intuitively through the process. This work reflects Black's approach to art as an exploration rather than a definitive statement.

=== List of other artistic works ===
- 2019: Works in Snow
- 2020: Home/Body Home/Land.

== See also ==
- REDress Project
- Red Dress Day
