= Isabella Aiukli Cornell =

American activist

Isabella Aiukli Cornell is an activist and citizen of the Choctaw Nation of Oklahoma. She is the organizing member of Matriarch, and inter-tribal non-profit based in Oklahoma. In 2018, her Junior prom dress garnered national attention which highlighted the crisis of violence against Native women.

== Activism ==
Isabella has been participating in activist movements against the epidemic of violence faced by Native American women and girls since the age of 14. She became an organizing member of Matriarch, an intertribal organization of women from different tribes, co-founded by Isabella's mother, Sarah Adams-Cornell.

=== The dress ===
Cornell made a strong political statement at her prom in 2018 with a red dress bearing symbols of her Choctow heritage. Cornell worked closely with the designer, Della Bighair-Stump, an indigenous designer belonging to Crow tribe, to create the applique design. The dress is a symbol of many indigenous women who have disappeared or have been murdered but never accounted for.

The dress is now on display in “Girlhood,” a new exhibit at the Smithsonian National Museum of American History, commemorating the 100th anniversary of women's suffrage. The red color of the dress is particularly symbolic by the Missing and Murdered Indigenous Women movement. Multiple native tribes also believe that red is the only color that spirits can see. The project believes that the color not only will help to bring awareness to the cause but also help guide back the spirits of the murdered women and children so that they can lay them to rest. The diamond-shaped beaded applique on the dress symbolizes the diamondback snake, venerated by Choctaw farmers as protector of crops. The wool bodice evokes the long history of Native peoples who traded fur for wool cloth beginning in the early 1600s.

== See also ==
- Minnijean Brown-Trickey
- National Museum of American History
- Missing and murdered Indigenous women
- Indigenous Peoples of the America
- REDress Project
