= Red Dress Day =

Commemorative event

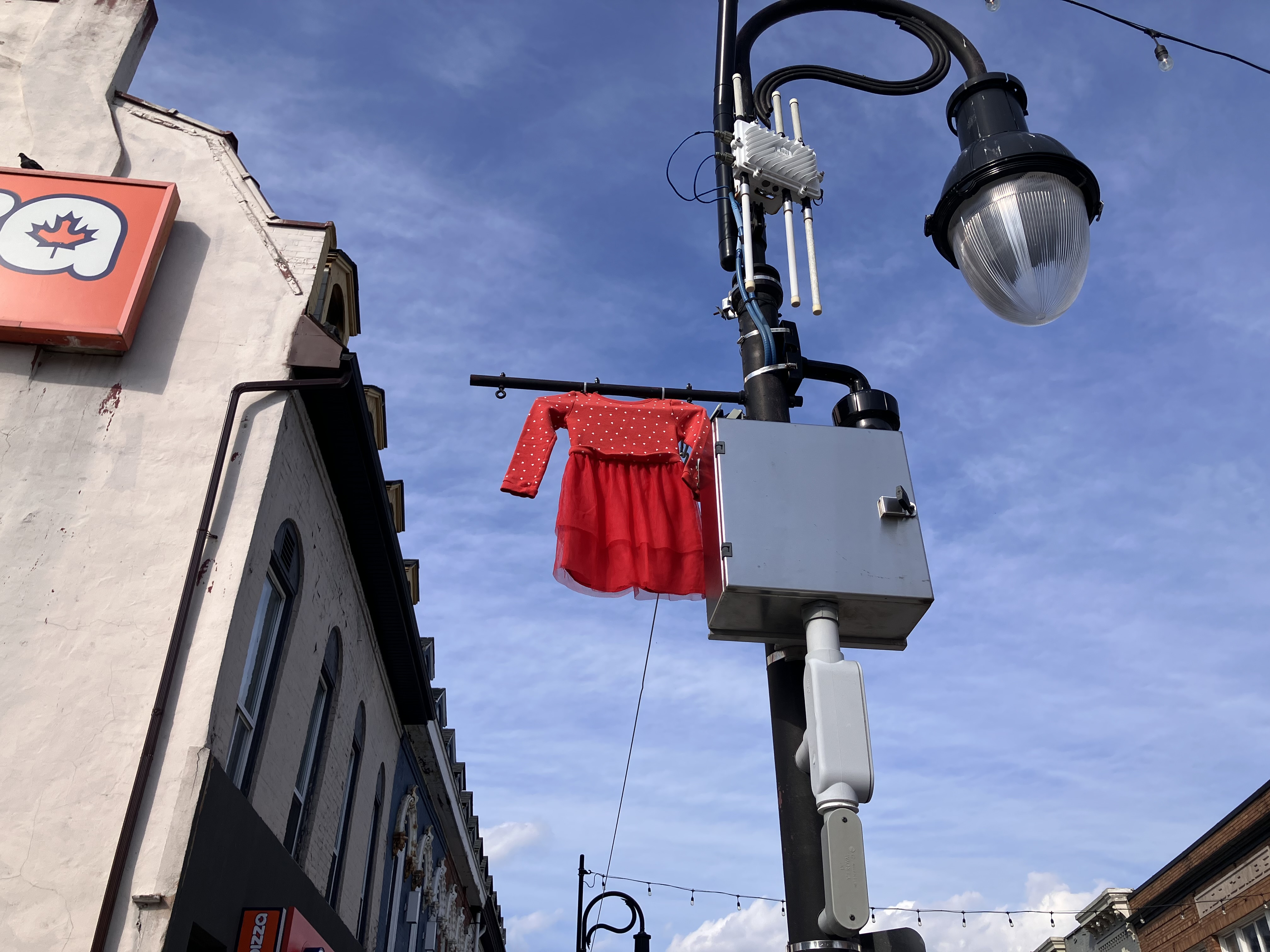
- Official name: National Day of Awareness for Missing and Murdered Indigenous Women and Girls
- Also called: Red Dress Day
- Observed by: Canada
- Type: Cultural
- Significance: Raises awareness of Missing and Murdered Indigenous Women, Girls, and Two-Spirit people (MMIWG2S)
- Date: May 5
- Frequency: Annual
- Started by: Jaime Black
- Related to: Missing and Murdered Indigenous Women and Girls

Red Dress Day, or Red Dress Campaign, is an annual event held by the REDress Project in memory of the lives of Missing and Murdered Indigenous Women and Girls across Canada. The event is held annually on May 5th to honor Hanna Harris who was murdered in Montana in 2013. May 5th would've been Hanna's birthday and was chosen to honor her and all Missing and Murdered Native American Women back in 2017. The first National Day of Awareness for Missing and Murdered Women and Girls happened in the United States of America on May 5th, 2017. Canada followed suit in 2019 and established their own National Day of Awareness for Missing and Murdered Indigenous Women and Girls and was nicknamed Red Dress Day. Red Dress Day calls attention to the disproportionate rates of violence against Indigenous women and Girls who go missing at six times the rate of non-Indigenous women and girls.

== Background ==
Inspired by the work of Métis artist Jaime Black that would go on to spark the REDress Project, this day draws attention to the more than 1,000 Missing and Murdered Indigenous Women and Girls (MMIWG) in Canada. The project was started in 2010 after Black displayed an installation at the University of Winnipeg that included a series of empty red dresses to honour and symbolize the lost lives of Indigenous women at the hands of violence. On this day, participants are encouraged to display empty red dresses in public spaces or wear red dresses to show support for the lives of MMIWG. Additional activities taking place on this day include also marches, memorials, and walks across Canada. Installations of red dresses are displayed in museums, university campuses, and exhibits. The origins of this day began with the Walking With Our Sisters – K’omoks where a public memorial art installation had taken place in honour of Missing and Murdered Indigenous Women.

May 5 was the birthday of Lisa Marie Young, a 21-year-old Tla-o-qui-aht woman who disappeared under suspicious circumstances from Nanaimo, BC on Canada Day 2002. Despite hundreds of tips from the public, RCMP investigators have made no progress in the case.

In 2016, the first the Red Dress Awareness Campaign and Installation were organised and generated higher volumes of public attention on a national scale in both Canada and the United States. Although the REDress Project was not created as a call for a National Inquiry into Missing and Murdered Indigenous Women and Girls, many supporters of the project and subsequent REDress Day are in favour of such an investigation, and used the event to put pressure on the Canadian government.

== Legacy ==
=== Alberta ===
Staff from the Awo Taan Native Healing Lodge, a shelter for Indigenous women and children in Calgary, Alberta, organized a local Red Dress Day event on November 19, 2019, at Calgary's Central Library. Attendees of the event had the chance to learn more about Missing and Murdered Indigenous Women and Girls, and were also invited to make a small felt doll wearing a red dress, inspired by the original project's installation of red dresses.

=== Ontario ===
Students at Cardinal Leger Secondary School, in Brampton, Ontario, paid tribute to Missing and Murdered Indigenous Women and Girls on May 3, 2017, during an event inspired by Red Dress Day. The students wrote names taken from the Missing and Murdered Indigenous Women and Girls list on approximately 1,200 red feathers, which were then placed in trees near the school.

== See also ==
- Jaime Black
- Am I Next
- Walking With Our Sisters
- Idle No More
- Sisters in Spirit
