= Road allowance community =

Road allowance communities were settlements established by Métis people in Canada in the late 1800s through most of the 20th century on road allowances at the margins of settler society. Road allowances are frequently unused portions of land established by the Dominion Land Survey for road and rail access to settlements. Métis people were dispossessed from their land in the late 19th century, so they frequently squatted in these unclaimed and marginal spaces.

== History ==
Following the Red River rebellion (1869) and the North-West Rebellion (1885), Métis people were dispossessed from their land through a practice of issuing scrip that promised land in the Prairie Provinces in exchange for their land rights in more southern homelands. It was generally difficult for Métis people to redeem scrip for their promised lands, forcing them to settle illegally in unclaimed road allowances. After the Battle of Batoche (1885), many Métis people were burned out of the homes and evicted by settlers; many of their children were sent into the Canadian Indian residential school system.

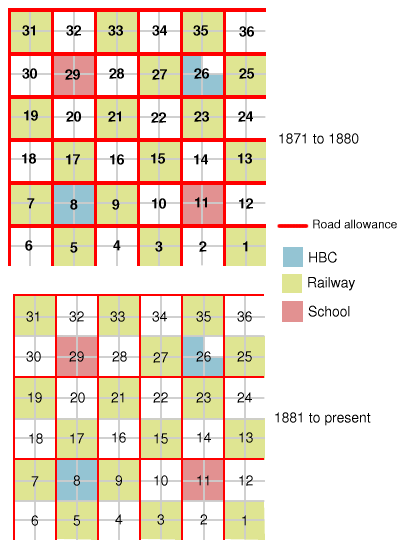
Road allowances and special sections in the Dominion Land Survey.

In 1872, the Dominion Land Survey established road allowances between surveyed lots for road and rail access and other infrastructure. These strips of land were frequently not used.

Between 1930 and 1960, most of the road allowance communities were broken up, often by force. Métis people no longer inhabit these communities, but many do still struggle with lack of housing or squat on unused land.

== Description ==
Historian Jesse Thistle describes road allowance communities as spaces of resilience and cultural resistance. Road allowance settlements typically consisted of log cabins with a tar paper roof. People in these settlements frequently did labour for local farms and were paid minimal wages or were paid in food.

Road allowance communities faced extreme poverty and racism, and were frequently forced to relocate. In spite of these hardships, many recollections of life in these settlements describe tight-knit and joyful communities. The settlements were not taxable and did not receive government services. This generally prevented children in road allowance communities from receiving a formal education. The independence of road allowance settlements helped to preserve the people's stories, oral tradition, and culture.

== In popular culture ==
The documentary Ashes and Tears tells about the forcible relocation of the road allowance community of Lestock to Green Lake in 1949.

Maria Campbell preserves some of the Métis oral histories of this time in her book, Stories of the Road Allowance People.
