= Murder of Ashlynne Mike =

2016 child murder in the Navajo Nation

- Location: Navajo Nation, near Shiprock, New Mexico, U.S.
- Date: May 2, 2016; Afternoon
- Attack type: Kidnapping; Child murder; Sexual assault; Bludgeoning
- Weapon: Tire iron / Crowbar
- Victim: Ashlynne Mike
- Perpetrator: Tom Begaye Jr.
- Motive: To conceal sexual assault
- Verdict: Pleaded guilty
- Convictions: First-degree murder; Kidnapping resulting in death; Aggravated sexual abuse resulting in death
- Sentence: Life imprisonment without the possibility of parole
- Judge: William P. Johnson

The murder of Ashlynne Mike occurred on May 2, 2016, when the 11-year-old Navajo girl was abducted and killed in the Navajo Nation near Shiprock, New Mexico. Her younger brother was also abducted but survived. The perpetrator, Tom Begaye Jr., pleaded guilty to murder and kidnapping and was sentenced to life in prison.

The case gained national attention due to a delay in issuing an Amber Alert, which was caused by the lack of an alert system on the Navajo Nation and Indian Country jurisdictional confusion among law enforcement agencies. The tragedy exposed these systemic failures and led directly to the passage of the federal Ashlynne Mike AMBER Alert in Indian Country Act in 2018. The law authorizes funding to help tribal communities establish and integrate their own emergency alert systems.

== Background ==
=== Victims ===
Ashlynne Mike was 11 years old and a fifth-grade student at Ojo Amarillo Elementary School in Fruitland, New Mexico. She played the xylophone in the school band. She lived in Lower Fruitland with her father, Gary Mike, and her siblings, including her nine-year-old brother, Ian. Her mother, Pamela Foster, resided in Redlands, California.

=== Perpetrator ===
Tom Begaye Jr. was a 27-year-old Navajo man from Waterflow, New Mexico, a community near Ashlynne's home. According to his public defender, Begaye was intellectually disabled and had been subjected to extreme abuse as a child, including being beaten with a two-by-four. Following the death of his parents in 2014, Begaye and his brother lived in a dilapidated home without basic necessities. In a later court motion, Begaye claimed he had a low IQ and had consumed a fifth of vodka and beer on the day of the murder.

== Abduction and murder ==
On the afternoon of May 2, 2016, Ashlynne and Ian Mike were walking home after being dropped off by their school bus when Tom Begaye lured them into his maroon van with the promise of letting them watch the movie Zootopia. Ian later got into the van hoping to protect his sister. Begaye drove in the opposite direction of their home, and as the children grew nervous, they held hands. He drove them to a remote desert area south of the Shiprock pinnacle.

According to Begaye's confession, he took Ashlynne from the van with a tire iron, sexually assaulted her, and struck her twice in the head with the tool because she was crying and begging to go home. He also strangled her. Begaye stated that Ashlynne was still moving when he left her for dead in the desert. He then left Ian alone in a different desert location. The boy was later found by a passerby and brought to safety.

== Investigation ==
=== Family and law enforcement response ===
When her children did not return home, Pamela Foster called the Navajo Nation Police Department in Shiprock but reported being repeatedly put on hold and told the department was short-staffed. At 6:53 p.m., Gary Mike formally filed a missing persons report with the Shiprock police. After Foster posted about the abduction on Facebook, community members organized their own search parties.

At approximately 7:15 p.m., a couple found Ian walking on a highway and took him to the Shiprock police station. Despite Ian's rescue, a coordinated, multi-agency response was slow to materialize.

=== Amber alert delay ===
A major controversy in the case was the multi-hour delay in issuing an Amber Alert. At the time, the Navajo Nation did not have an active Amber Alert system, despite having been part of a federal pilot program in 2007 to establish one. Jurisdictional confusion among the Navajo Nation Police, the Federal Bureau of Investigation (FBI), and New Mexico State Police contributed to the delay.

The Navajo police first requested an alert from the FBI at 9:07 p.m. The FBI, which has jurisdiction over major crimes in Indian Country, then contacted the National Center for Missing & Exploited Children (NCMEC) at 12:20 a.m. on May 3. NCMEC, in turn, contacted the New Mexico State Police to formally initiate the alert. The Amber Alert was ultimately issued at 2:30 a.m., approximately eight hours after Gary Mike had first reported his children missing.

=== Discovery and arrest ===
Ashlynne Mike's body was discovered on the morning of May 3, 2016, near the Shiprock pinnacle. That same morning, Tom Begaye Jr. participated in a Native American Church prayer ceremony at a sweat lodge for Ashlynne's safe return. He was arrested by law enforcement as he was leaving the ceremony.

== Legal proceedings ==
Begaye was charged in federal court with crimes including first-degree murder, kidnapping resulting in death, and aggravated sexual abuse resulting in death. On August 1, 2017, he pleaded guilty to the charges in the U.S. District Court in Albuquerque as part of a plea agreement. On October 20, 2017, judge William P. Johnson sentenced Begaye to life in prison without the possibility of parole.

On June 24, 2019, Begaye filed a pro se motion from federal prison to reverse his sentence, arguing he had received ineffective legal counsel and that he did not understand the proceedings due to his low IQ and intoxication on the day of the crime.

== Aftermath and legacy ==
=== Ashlynne Mike AMBER Alert in Indian Country Act ===
Ashlynne's murder exposed the absence of an effective emergency alert system on the Navajo Nation and other tribal lands. In response, Ashlynne's mother, Pamela Foster, became a prominent advocate for legislative change, and her father, Gary Mike, filed a lawsuit against the Navajo Nation for failing to have an emergency notification system.

Their efforts, along with those of other advocates, led U.S. senator John McCain to introduce the AMBER Alert in Indian Country Act in April 2017. The bill was later renamed the Ashlynne Mike AMBER Alert in Indian Country Act in her honor. It passed unanimously in the U.S. Senate in November 2017, passed the U.S. House of Representatives in February 2018, and was signed into law by U.S. president Donald Trump on April 13, 2018. The act authorizes federal grants to help tribal communities integrate their alert systems with state and regional networks.

=== Death penalty debate ===
While the Navajo Nation officially opposes capital punishment, Pamela Foster petitioned the tribal government to reconsider its stance. Then-Navajo Nation president Russell Begaye stated that he had informed prosecutors the tribe would have supported the death penalty for Tom Begaye. Ultimately, the U.S. Attorney General decided against seeking it in this case.

=== Memorials ===
Ashlynne's father organizes memorial walks, which were paused due to the COVID-19 pandemic but resumed in 2025, partly inspired by the death of another Indigenous girl. The walk is held in partnership with the nonprofit Navajo YES and is part of the annual Shiprock Marathon. On May 28, 2023, Ashlynne's parents were presented with an honorary high school diploma in her name from Kirtland Central High School.

== See also ==
- Missing and Murdered Indigenous Women
