= Missing and Murdered Indigenous Women =

Violence against Indigenous women and girls

Missing and Murdered Indigenous Women and Girls
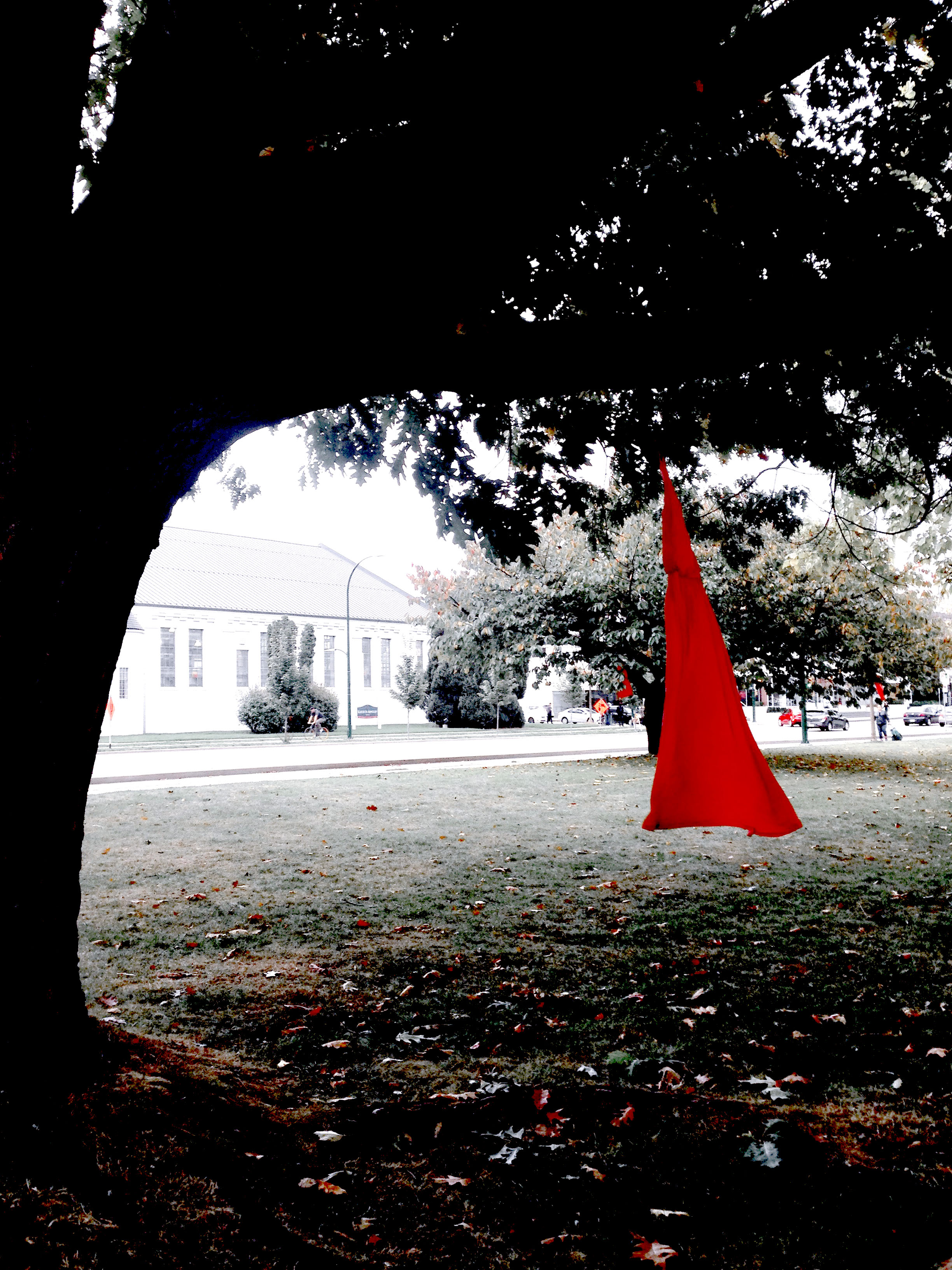
- Art installation inspired by the REDress Project (Seaforth Peace Park, Vancouver, Canada, National Day for Vigils for MMIW, October 2016)
- Abbreviation: MMIW, or alternatively MMIWG (murdered/missing Indigenous women and girls), MMIWG2S (murdered/missing Indigenous women, girls, and two-spirit), or MMIP (shorter version of the previous more inclusive abbreviation)
- Formation: Canada and United States
- Products: 2011 Statistics Canada report; 2014 and 2015 RCMP reports on Missing and Murdered Aboriginal Women and Girls; June 2019 Canadian National Inquiry into Missing and Murdered Indigenous Women and Girls; Missing & Murdered: The Unsolved Cases of Indigenous Women and Girls (CBC investigative report); REDress Project
- Services: Movement to increase awareness of disproportionate violence experienced by Indigenous Canadian and Native American women
- Affiliations: Native Women's Association of Canada; Assembly of First Nations; RCMP; Drag the Red; Walking With Our Sisters; Sisters in Spirit; National Coalition for our Stolen Sisters

Missing and Murdered Indigenous Women and Girls are victims of violence against Indigenous women in Canada and the United States, of those in the First Nations in Canada and Native American communities, but also amongst other Indigenous peoples, such as in Australia and New Zealand. A grassroots movement raises awareness of MMIWG through marches, protests, holding meetings, domestic violence training, building and maintaining records of the missing, and other informational sessions for law enforcement agencies.

Activists from Indigenous communities in both the United States and Canada have tried to raise awareness of the connection between sex trafficking, sexual harassment, sexual assault, and the women and girls who go missing and are murdered. From 2001 to 2015, the homicide rate for Indigenous women in Canada was almost six times higher than that for other women. In Nunavut, Yukon, the Northwest Territories, and the provinces of Alberta, Manitoba, and Saskatchewan, this overrepresentation of Indigenous women and girls among homicide victims has been even higher, in part due to the larger Indigenous populations in these provinces and territories. In the United States, Native American women are more than twice as likely to experience violence as any other demographic. One in three Indigenous women are sexually assaulted during their life, 55.5% are violently assaulted by an intimate partner, 66.4% have experienced psychological aggression from an intimate partner, and 67% of assaults reported involve non-Indigenous perpetrators, while 70% of assaults go unreported. (Note: Native Americans constituted 0.7% of U.S. population in 2015.)

MMIWG has been described as a Canadian national crisis, and a Canadian genocide. In response to repeated calls from Indigenous groups, activists, and non-governmental organizations, the Government of Canada, under Prime Minister Justin Trudeau, with the support of all ten provincial governments, established a National Inquiry into Missing and Murdered Indigenous Women and Girls in September 2016. According to the inquiry's backgrounder, "Indigenous women and girls in Canada are disproportionately affected by all forms of violence. Although Indigenous women make up 4% of Canada's female population, 16% of all women murdered in Canada between 1980 and 2012 were Indigenous." The inquiry was completed and presented to the public on June 3, 2019. Notable MMIWG cases in Canada include numerous women and girls raped and murdered on the Highway of Tears and some of the 49 women from the Metro Vancouver area murdered by serial killer Robert Pickton.

In the United States, the Violence Against Women Act (VAWA) was reauthorized in 2013, which for the first time gave tribes jurisdiction to investigate and prosecute felony domestic violence offenses involving both Native American offenders as well as non-Native offenders on reservations. (Note: 26% of Natives live on reservations.) In 2019, the House of Representatives, led by the Democratic Party, passed H.R.1585 (Violence Against Women Reauthorization Act of 2019) by a vote of 263–158, which would have further increased tribes' prosecution rights. The bill was not taken up by the Senate, which at the time had a Republican majority. In 2022, reauthorization became law as part of the Consolidated Appropriations Act of 2022.

== Background ==
As a group that has been "socially, economically, and politically marginalized", Indigenous women have been frequent targets for hatred and violence. Underlying factors such as poverty and homelessness contribute to their victimization, as do historical factors such as racism, sexism, and the legacy of imperialism. The trauma caused by abuses under Canada's residential school system also plays a role.

Indigenous women are between 3 and 3 1/2 times more likely to be victims of violent crime than other women, and the violence they face is often more severe.

=== Australia ===
First Nations peoples in Australia have reported much of the same levels of violence and systemic minimization as other countries, such as Canada and the United States, leading the Australian Parliament to launch an inquiry in 2022 that was criticized for its lack of media coverage and for being closed not even a year after being started. The extent of the problem in Australia has been difficult to quantify as there is no agency keeping track of the exact numbers. From what is available, the murder rate is at 12 times the national Australian average.

=== Canada ===
In Canada, according to activists, "thousands of cases" of missing and murdered Indigenous women over the last half-century were not properly investigated due to police bias. The 49 women murdered by serial killer Robert Pickton, who was eventually jailed in 2007, are cited as an example; with families claiming that Pickton was able to go on killing for so long because police had not taken the disappearances seriously because most of the women were sex workers or Indigenous.

In 2010, artist Jaime Black started the REDress project to represent the Indigenous women and girls that were missing. Her first dress was displayed in a Museum in Winnipeg, which lead to the creation of Red Dress Day (May 5 in both Canada and US) to call attention to disproportionate rates of violence against Indigenous women. A 2011 Statistics Canada report estimated that, between 1997 and 2000, the rate of homicides for Aboriginal women and girls was almost seven times higher than that of other female victims. Compared to non-Indigenous women and girls, they were also "disproportionately affected by all forms of violence." They are also significantly over-represented among female Canadian homicide victims, and are far more likely than other women to go missing. In 2012, Sheila North Wilson coined the hashtag #MMIW, for missing and murdered Indigenous women, while working for the Assembly of Manitoba Chiefs.

A 2014 report by the RCMP, titled Missing and Murdered Aboriginal Women: A National Operational Overview, found that more than 1,000 Indigenous women were murdered over a span of 30 years. In response to activists, the federal government funded data collection on missing and murdered women, ending in 2010. The Native Women's Association of Canada (NWAC) has documented 582 cases since the 1960s, with 39% after 2000. Nevertheless, advocacy groups say that many more women have been missing, with the highest number of cases in British Columbia. Notable cases have included 19 women killed in the Highway of Tears murders, The 5+ victims of the unidentified Killing Feilds Killer in Edmonton. and some of the 49 women from the Vancouver area murdered by serial killer Robert Pickton. In response to repeated calls from Indigenous groups, activists, and non-governmental organizations, the Government of Canada under Prime Minister Justin Trudeau established the National Inquiry into Missing and Murdered Indigenous Women and Girls in September 2016. According to the April 22, 2016 background of the inquiry, between the years 1980 and 2012, Indigenous women represented 16% of all female homicides in Canada, while constituting only 4% of the female population in Canada.

In September 2016, following intense pressure from Indigenous groups and human rights organizations, Canadian Prime Minister Justin Trudeau launched the National Inquiry into Missing and Murdered Indigenous Women (MMIW). Over three years, the inquiry gathered more than 1,000 hours of testimony from 2,300 witnesses through private interviews and public hearings, culminating in its final report in 2019. The report confirmed what Indigenous communities have long recognized: the violence they endure is rooted in the systemic oppression of a settler state and a colonial genocidal agenda. Chief Commissioner Marion Buller stated, "The truth is that we live in a country whose laws and institutions continue to violate fundamental human and Indigenous rights."

=== United States ===
In the United States, Native American women are more than twice as likely to experience violence than any other demographic. One in three Indigenous women is sexually assaulted during her life, and 67% of these assaults are perpetrated by non-Native perpetrators. (Note: Native Americans constituted 0.7% of U.S. population in 2015.) According to research from the National Institute of Justice, it was found that American Indian women are 1.2 times as likely to experience lifetime violence, 1.8 times as likely to be a victim of stalking, and 1.7 times as likely to be victims of violence in the past year compared to the Non-Hispanic White population. Lisa Brunner, executive director of Sacred Spirits First National Coalition states:

What's happened through US Federal law and policy is they created lands of impunity where this is like a playground for serial rapists, batterers, killers, whoever and our children aren't protected at all.

There were two acts that meant to remedy this issue in 2010 and 2013, Tribal Law and Order Act (TLOA) and Violence Against Women Act (VAWA) respectively. The Tribal Law and Order Act gave tribes the ability to increase jail sentences for criminal cases. The federal Violence Against Women Act was reauthorized in 2013, which for the first time gave tribes jurisdiction to investigate and prosecute felony domestic violence offenses involving both Native American offenders on reservations, as well as non-Native offenders. (Note: 26% of Natives live on reservations.) In 2019 the Democratic House passed H.R. 1585 (Violence Against Women Reauthorization Act of 2019) by a vote of 263–158, which aimed to increase tribes' prosecution rights much further. This act was stalled in the Republican Senate up until 2022, when President Biden signed it into law through the Omnibus appropriations package. Law enforcement, journalists, and activists in Indigenous communities—in both the US and Canada—have fought to bring awareness to this connection between sex trafficking, sexual harassment, sexual assault, and the women who go missing and are murdered.

In 2021, Secretary of the Interior Deb Haaland announced the creation of the Missing and Murdered Unit (MMU) within the Bureau of Indian Affairs.

== Statistics for Canada ==
Various groups have collected data from different periods of time and using different criteria. Available data suggest that the number of missing and murdered Indigenous women is disproportionately high compared to their percentage of the total population. In Canada, according to activists, "thousands of cases" of missing and murdered Indigenous women over the last half-century were not properly investigated due to alleged police bias. The 49 women murdered by serial killer Robert Pickton, who was eventually jailed in 2007, are cited as an example; with families claiming that Pickton was able to go on killing for so long because police had not taken the disappearances seriously because most of the women were sex workers and Indigenous.

The National Centre for Missing Persons and Unidentified Remains (NCMPUR) unit of the RCMP was established in 2010 in response to their investigations of murdered and missing Indigenous women, particularly in relation to what became known as the "Highway of Tears"—an area of intersecting highways around Highway 16 in British Columbia. In order to track a national picture of missing persons across Canada, the RCMP created the Missing Children, Persons and unidentified Remains (MCPIR) unit and developed an algorithm to collect and collate "all missing persons reports and related reports filed by police across Canada" into the Canadian Police Information Centre (CPIC). Since 2010, NCMPUR has published the "NCMPUR Fast Fact Sheet" to provide a "national breakdown of missing persons reports by province, age (child or adult), sex, and probable cause."

One of the most significant findings of the "National Inquiry into Missing and Murdered Indigenous Women and Girls" report of June 2019 was that there was no "reliable estimate of the numbers of missing and murdered Indigenous women, girls, and 2SLGBTQQIA persons in Canada." One reason is that Canada did not maintain a database for missing people until 2010, which made it difficult to determine the rate at which Indigenous women are murdered or go missing, or to compare their data to those of other populations.

A database compiled as part of a 2013 Ph.D. thesis identified 824 missing or murdered Indigenous women between 1946 and 2013. A 2014 report from RCMP said that the "number grew to almost 1,200 between 1980 and 2012." From 1980 to 2012, Indigenous women represented 16% of all female homicides in Canada while being only 4% of the female population in Canada. A 2011 Statistics Canada report estimated that between 1997 and 2000, the rate of homicides for Indigenous women was almost seven times higher than other women. While homicides for non-Indigenous women declined between 1980 and 2015, the number of Indigenous women who were victims of homicide increased from 9% of all female homicide victims in 1980, to 24% in 2015. From 2001 to 2015, the homicide rate for Indigenous women in Canada was almost six times as high as the homicide rate for non-Indigenous women, representing "4.82 per 100,000 population versus 0.82 per 100,000 population". In Nunavut, the Yukon, the Northwest Territories, and in the provinces of Manitoba, Alberta, and Saskatchewan, this over-representation of Indigenous women among homicide victims was even higher. According to a 2007 study by the Province of Saskatchewan—the only province to have systematically reviewed its missing persons files for cases involving Indigenous women—Indigenous women were found to have made up 6% of the province's population, and 60% of the province's missing women cases.

In the CBC investigative report, "Missing & Murdered: The Unsolved Cases of Indigenous Women and Girls", an interactive database was created that included more than 300 persons of unsolved cases of missing and murdered Indigenous women by February 2016. CBC investigated 34 cases in which families disagreed with authorities' determination that no foul play was involved; it found "suspicious circumstances, unexplained bruises and other factors that suggest further investigation is warranted."

=== RCMP reports (2014, 2015) ===
In late 2013, the Commissioner of the RCMP initiated a study of reported cases of missing and murdered Indigenous women across all police jurisdictions in Canada. The result of the inquiry was a report ordered by the Stephen Harper administration, entitled "Missing and Murdered Aboriginal Women: A National Operational Overview", which was released on May 27, 2014, and dated back to 1951. The report stated that 1,181 Indigenous women were killed or went missing across the country between 1980 and 2012. During that 33-year period, it reported there were 1,181 incidents and 225 unsolved cases. Among all female homicides (Indigenous and non-Indigenous), 80% were solved. Of the cases analyzed by the RCMP, 67% were murder victims, 20% were missing persons, 4% were suspicious deaths, and 9% were unknown.

In 2015, the RCMP published an updated report which showed that murder rates and the percentage solved (80%) were essentially unchanged since the 2014 report. The 2015 Update reported 106 unsolved homicide cases, 98 unsolved missing cases, and an overall resolution rate of 9.3% from the prior year: 11.7% for homicides and 6.7% for missing Aboriginal females. The RCMP study was mostly limited to crimes committed in areas policed by the RCMP as the 2015 Update did not include homicide data from the "over 300 non-RCMP police agencies" that was included in the 2014 Overview. The Forensic Document Review Project (FDRP) conducted as part of the National Inquiry into MMIWG (2019) found that the 2014 and 2015 RCMP reports identified "narrow and incomplete causes of homicides of Indigenous women and girls in Canada".

==== Controversies and findings of the 2015 Report ====
The Harper government, including Bernard Valcourt, who served as federal Minister of Aboriginal Affairs and Northern Development from 2013 to 2015, had rejected calls for an inquiry into missing and murdered Indigenous women, saying that there had been enough studies undertaken. They said they were addressing the problem "through broad public safety and criminal justice measures." Valcourt said in the fall of 2015 that the "deaths and disappearances came down to a lack of respect among aboriginal men on reserves for aboriginal women, and urged chiefs and councils to take action." During a private meeting between Valcourt and chiefs held on March 20, 2015, in Calgary, Valcourt released the statistics from the 2015 RCMP report. He infuriated the chiefs when he said that "up to 70 percent of the murdered and missing indigenous women stems from their own communities," basing his claim on the conclusions of the 2015 RCMP report.

In response to Valcourt's statement, Chief Marshall Bernice Marshall sent an official request to the RCMP on March 26, 2015, in which she asked for the 2015 RCMP report, as well as access to data from the National Centre for Missing Persons and Unidentified Remains (NCMPUR). (Note: The National Centre for Missing Persons and Unidentified Remains (NCMPUR) is "Canada's national centre that provides law enforcement, medical examiners and chief coroners with specialized investigative services in support of missing persons and unidentified remains investigations".) In his April 7, 2015, response to Marshall's request, then-RCMP commissioner Bob Paulson said that, while the May 27, 2014, report was online, the RCMP did not have the authority to release NCMPUR data. He added that the RCMP does not disclose statistics on the ethnicity of perpetrators under the Access to Information Act, to respect their "bias-free policing policy" as publicizing "ethnicity of [offenders] has the potential to stigmatize and marginalize vulnerable populations." Paulson then confirmed the statistics cited by Valcourt, saying:

The consolidated data from the nearly 300 contributing police agencies have confirmed that 70% of the offenders were of Aboriginal origin, 25% were non-aboriginal, and 5% were of unknown ethnicity. However, it is not the ethnicity of the offender that is relevant, but rather the relationship between victim and offender that guides our focus with respect to prevention ... Aboriginal females were killed by a spouse, family member or intimate relation in 62% of cases; similarly, non-aboriginal females were killed by a spouse, family member or intimate relation in 74% of occurrences. Female homicide across all ethnicities is inextricably linked to familial and spousal violence; it is for this reason that RCMP analysis and prevention efforts have focussed on the relationship between the victim and offender.

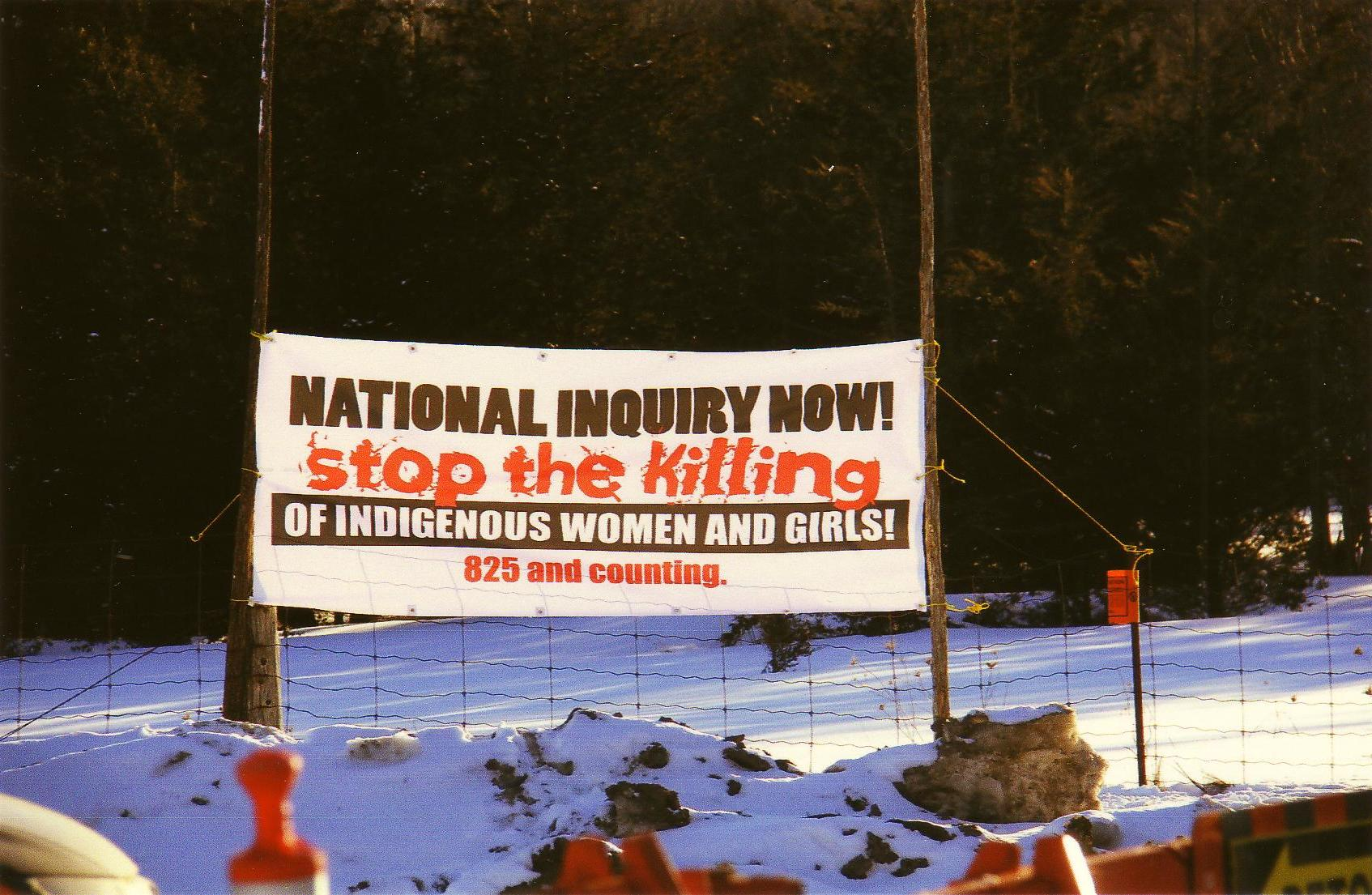
Sign displayed at a protest held on March 4, 2014, on the Tyendinaga Mohawk Territory, Ontario

Paulson copied this letter to Valcourt, then-Premier of Alberta Jim Prentice, Michelle Moody-Itwaru (Note: Michelle Moody-Itwaru became Executive Coordinator at National Inquiry Into Missing and Murdered Women in Canada) of the Assembly of First Nations (AFN), and Lorna Martin of the Native Women's Association of Canada (NWAC).

The 2016–2019 National Inquiry's Forensic Document Review Project (FDRP) found that the "often-cited statistic that Indigenous men are responsible for 70% of murders of Indigenous women and girls is not factually based"; and that "the statistics relied on in the RCMP's 2015 Report are inaccurate and provide a misleading picture of the relationship between offenders and victims in cases of homicides of Indigenous females. The empirical basis for the claim set out in the 2015 Report is an analysis of the narrow statistical data on 32 homicides of Indigenous women and girls within RCMP jurisdiction in 2013 and 2014."

=== NWAC report (2005–2011) ===
The Native Women's Association of Canada (NWAC) database, which was created with federal funding in 2005, reported that from the 1960s to 2010, there were 582 missing and murdered Indigenous women. This was the first time a number had been given based on research. An initiative called Walk 4 Justice collected names of missing and murdered Indigenous women from 2008 to 2011, yielding over 4,000 names that they shared with the NWAC. There was confusion about the data produced by this informal initiative: a Walk 4 Justice activist contacted by CBC News said 'roughly 60 to 70 per cent' of the 4,000 or so people on her list were Indigenous."

In February 2016, Canada's Minister responsible for the Status of Women, Patty Hajdu, acknowledged that good data was lacking to estimate the number of MMIW, but pointed to NWAC data to indicate that the number could be as high as 4,000 MMIW in Canada from 1980 to 2012. The RCMP report estimated the number was 1,200. Hajdu said that historically there had been under-reporting by law enforcement of cases of murdered or missing Indigenous women.

=== Highway of Tears ===
External videos
- "B.C.‘s infamous Highway of Tears" (2006) - CBC Archives, (2:32, min)

The term "Highway of Tears" refers to the 700 kilometres (430 mi) stretch of Highway 16 from Prince George to Prince Rupert, British Columbia, which has been the site of the murder and disappearance of a number of mainly Indigenous women since 1969.

In response to the Highway of Tears crisis, the RCMP in BC launched Project E-Pana in 2005. It initiated an investigation of nine murdered women, launching a task force in 2006. In 2007, it added an additional nine cases, which include cases of both murdered and missing women along Highways 16, 97, and 5. The task force consists of more than 50 investigators, and cases include those from the years 1969 to 2006.

Government organizations and Indigenous organizations have different estimates of the number of victims along the highway, with police identifying 18 murders and disappearances, 13 of them teenagers, and other organizations placing the number as closer to 40. A reason for this numerical discrepancy is that for a disappearance or murder to be included in the RCMP's E-Pana project statistics, the RCMP requires for the crime to have happened within a mile of Highway 16, 97, or 5; their count rejects all cases that take place elsewhere along the route.

Many people hitchhike along this stretch of highway because they do not own cars and there is a lack of public transit. The Highway of Tears murders have led to initiatives by the BC government to dissuade women from hitchhiking, such as billboards along the highway warning women of the potential risks as well as the introduction of a bus route on highway 16. Numerous documentaries have focused on the victims associated with this highway. The Canadian media often refer to the highway in coverage of missing and murdered Indigenous women, girls, and two-spirit people in Canada.

== Canadian National Inquiry into MMIW ==
From 2016 to 2019, the Canadian government and the ten provincial and three territorial governments conducted the National Inquiry into Missing and Murdered Indigenous Women. The inquiry included reviews of law enforcement documents as well as community hearings and testimonies.

The final report of the inquiry concluded that the high level of violence directed at FNIM women and girls is "caused by state actions and inactions rooted in colonialism and colonial ideologies." It also concluded that the crisis constituted an ongoing "race, identity and gender-based genocide."

== Statistics for the United States ==
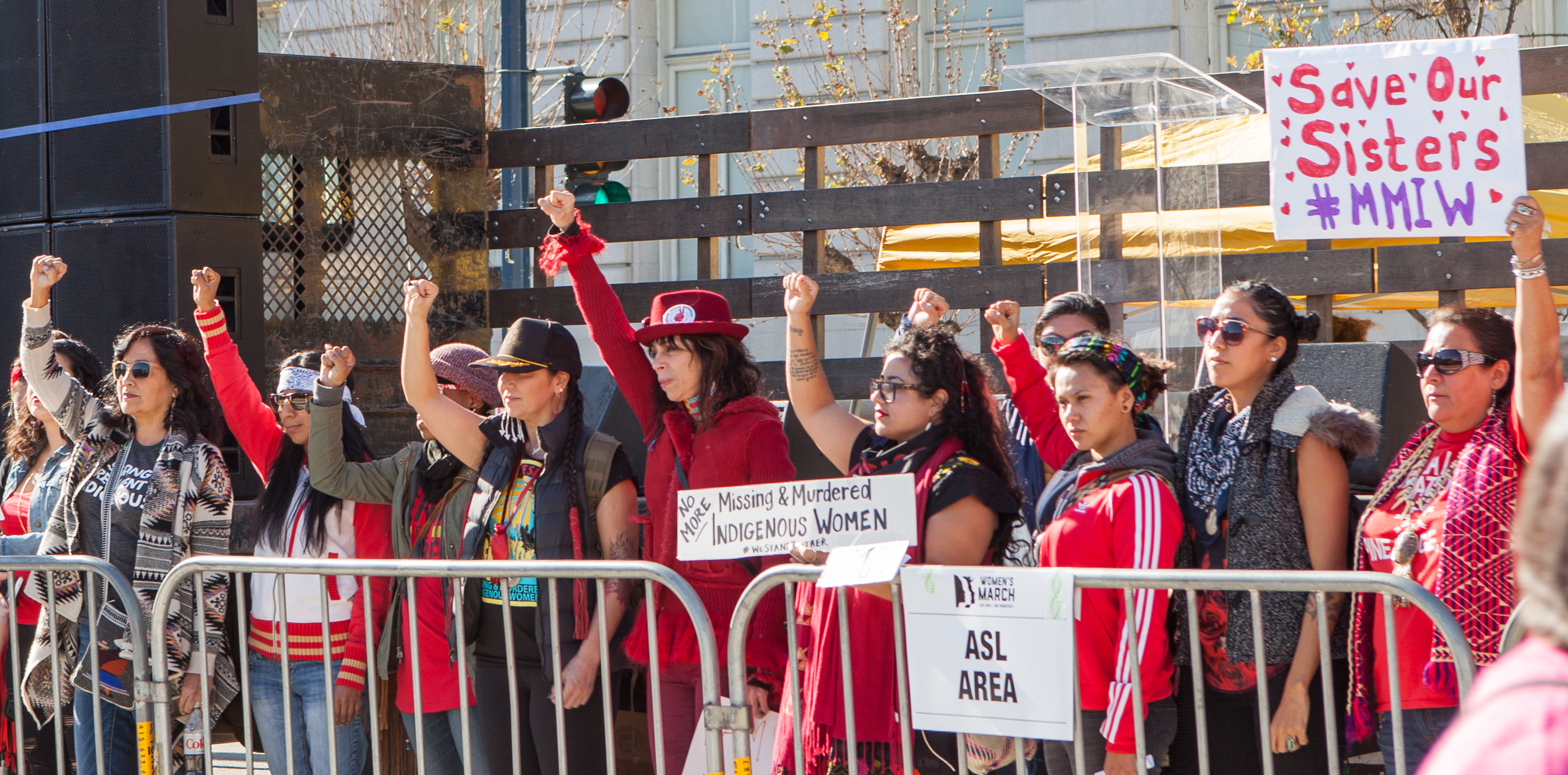
Activists for Missing and Murdered Indigenous Women (MMIW) at the 2018 Women's March in San Francisco

The National Crime Information Center reported 5,712 missing Indigenous women and girls in 2016. A study funded by the US Department of Justice found that,

National rates of homicide victimization against American Indian and Alaska Native women are second to those of their African American counterparts, but higher than those for white women. However, these national averages hide the extremely high rates of murder against American Indian and Alaska Native women present in some counties consisting primarily of tribal lands. Some counties have rates of murder against American Indian and Alaska Native women that are over ten times the national average.

Data on MMIW in the United States has been difficult to gather. The race, citizenship or ethnicity of Native Americans is often mis-identified on death certificates and law enforcement records. Less than half of incidents of violence against women are reported. Many times when Indigenous women and girls go missing, or when Indigenous murder victims are unidentified, forensic evidence has not been accurately collected or preserved by local law enforcement. Cases have been allowed to quickly go "cold", and crucial evidence has been "lost", or never forwarded on from local law enforcement to the appropriate agencies. As these cases go unreported, it allowed violence and murder to be inaccurately represented in statistical data against Indigenous women, but it has also allowed aggressors to go unpunished.

A 1999 Bureau of Justice Statistics report on American Indians and crime did not provide information about missing or murdered Indigenous women.

Incidents of violence on tribal lands are frequently unprosecuted. The Major Crimes Act (1885) limits the jurisdiction of tribal governments to prosecute violent crimes. These crimes must be prosecuted by the federal government. A statement by the US Government Accountability Office reported that US Attorneys Offices (USAOs) received 10,000 cases from Indian country for prosecution between 2005 and 2009. Seventy-seven percent of these were violent crimes. The USAOs declined to prosecute over half of these violent crimes.

The federal Violence Against Women Act was reauthorized in 2013, which for the first time gave tribes jurisdiction to investigate and prosecute felony domestic violence offenses involving Native American and non-Native offenders on reservations. 26% of Natives live on reservations. In 2019 the House passed H.R. 1585 (Violence Against Women Reauthorization Act of 2019) by a vote of 263–158, which increases tribes' prosecution rights much further. However, in the Senate its progress has stalled.

=== Urban Indian Health Institute study ===
In 2018, The Urban Indian Health Institute investigated reports of MMIW in 71 urban centers. They found 506 unique cases, with 80% of these cases occurring between 2000 and 2018. Of these cases, 128 (25%) were reported missing, 280 (56%) were murdered, and 98 (19%) were removed from a missing person database with no information as to whether the victim was found safe or deceased. The study found that many cities had poor data collection, and many jurisdictions did not respond to Freedom of Information Act requests for data, or responded with incomplete information; the study concluded that the 506 cases were 'likely an undercount'. The study used law enforcement records, state and national databases, media reports, public social media postings, and community and family member accounts to compile their report. They found that 153 cases did not exist in law enforcement data.

The study also surveyed media coverage of the cases investigated in the report. They found that one-third of the media outlets covering MMIW cases used 'violent language' that reflected 'racism or misogyny or racial stereotyping' in their portrayals of the victims.

== Initiatives in the United States ==
Senator Tom Udall was also a leader in the 2013 effort to amend VAWA to restore Tribal jurisdiction over domestic violence crimes committed on reservations, which was instrumental to ensuring that Native women enjoy the same protection from domestic abuse as all other women in the United States. Earlier in his career, he worked to prevent and prosecute domestic violence when he served as New Mexico's attorney general, and even convened the first statewide roundtable on domestic violence. The VAWA reauthorization passed by the House includes measures to address the MMIW crisis by:

- Restoring Tribal criminal jurisdiction over non-Members who commit crimes against children, and law enforcement personnel responsible for enforcing the 2013 VAWA jurisdiction
- Restoring Tribal criminal jurisdiction over non-Members for crimes of sexual violence, stalking, sex trafficking, stalking, and obstruction of justice
- Increasing Tribal access to federal criminal databases, making it easier to track and document MMIW cases.

Activism and proposed legislation has drawn the issue of MMIW to the attention of some lawmakers. In 2018 and 2019 many US states, including Washington, Minnesota, Arizona, and Wisconsin have begun to take steps toward passing legislation to increase awareness of this issue and to build databases that track missing and murdered Indigenous women and girls.

Currently, the federal laws surrounding violent crimes create difficulties in dealing with non-Native perpetrators on native lands.

According to the Supreme Court ruling in Oliphant v. Suquamish Indian Tribe (1978), tribal courts do not hold any jurisdictional powers over non-American Indians and Alaska Natives and therefore cannot prosecute or punish them for their crimes on reservations. Additionally, the Indian Civil Rights Act of 1968 limits the maximum punishment for any crime to a $5000 fine and up to one year in prison. All violent felonies committed on tribal lands can be prosecuted by the federal government through the FBI, because of the federal government's relationship with the sovereign tribal nations. Outside of Alaska, California, Minnesota, Wisconsin, Oregon, and Nebraska (States where Public Law 280 applies), state and county authorities do not have criminal jurisdiction on reservations. Bachman believes that this split in authority creates problems as law enforcement departments compete over jurisdictional powers based on the nature of the crime. This lowers the overall effectiveness of law enforcement, and provides enough immunity to non-citizens of the tribes (usually members of the dominant culture) for such crimes to have become commonplace. As noted in the movie (no movie cited), the FBI does not keep data on missing Indigenous women.

=== National Day of Awareness for Missing and Murdered Indigenous Women and Girls ===
The US declared May 5, 2018, as a national day of awareness in order to raise concern for the crisis, and refocus attention on issues affecting Indigenous women. It hopes to improve relations between the federal and tribal governments.

=== United States legislation ===
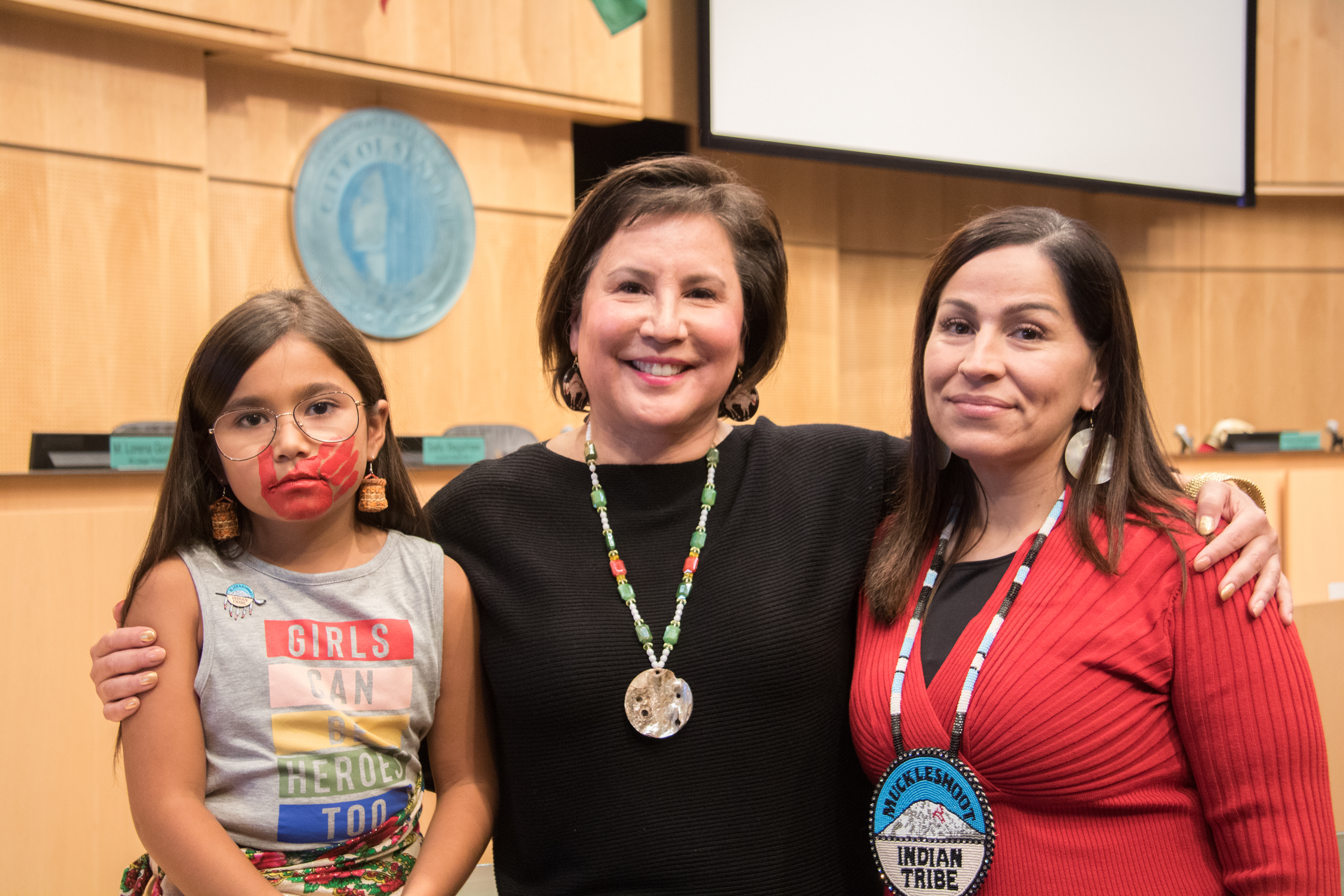
City Council member Juarez supporting MMIWG, in Seattle, Washington, 2019

==== Federal ====
===== Savanna's Act =====
The bill known as Savanna's Act was initially introduced in Congress in October 2017 by former Senator Heidi Heitkamp, but later reintroduced in January 2019 by Senator Lisa Murkowski. The purpose of Savanna's Act is to increase cooperation and coordination between "Federal, State, Tribal, and local law enforcement agencies" as this has been one of the major barriers to developing an accurate database. This bill would also implement training for Tribal agencies from the Attorney General as well as improve tribal access to databases (including the National Missing and Unidentified Persons System). In addition, data collection will be increased so that statistics more accurately represent missing and murdered Indigenous women. The bill was passed by Congress in September 2020, and signed into law by then U.S. president Donald Trump a month later.

===== Not Invisible Act =====
The Not Invisible Act of 2019 (signed October 10, 2020) requires the Department of the Interior and the Department of Justice to form a joint commission on violent crime in Native American communities. It was the first U.S. legislation introduced and passed by four congressional members from federally recognized Tribes, led by then-Congresswoman Deb Haaland. The Act established the Not Invisible Act Commission, comprising law enforcement, Tribal leaders, federal officials, service providers, survivors, and family members of missing and murdered individuals. The Commission's mandate includes addressing public safety challenges related to missing and murdered Indigenous peoples (MMIP) and human trafficking by developing recommendations to improve case identification, data tracking, resource coordination, and information sharing with Tribal governments. It also aims to address law enforcement recruitment and retention issues. The Commission's full membership was announced in May 2022, and its first plenary meeting occurred in June 2022. The federal government emphasized its commitment to collaborating with Tribal nations to combat the MMIP crisis, with the Department of Justice supporting the Commission's efforts.

===== House of Representatives Bill 1585 =====
On March 7, 2019, Congress introduced this bill in the House of Representatives and this bill was to reauthorize the Violence Against Women Act of 1994 and other specific reasons.

==== State ====
===== Washington State House Bill 2951 =====
Effective May 7, 2018, this bill orders an inquiry into how to increase rates of reporting for missing Native American women in the state of Washington. The Washington State Patrol was given a deadline of June 1, 2019, to report to the legislature its results of the study. This includes analysis and data on the number of missing women in the state, barriers to use state resources, as well as recommendations on how to overcome them.

===== Arizona State House Bill 2570 =====
On March 11, 2019, the Arizona State Legislature, House of Representatives passed Arizona House Bill 2570 "Establishing a Study Committee on Missing and Murdered Indigenous Women and Girls". If approved in the Senate, the bill would seek to "establish a study committee to conduct a comprehensive study to determine how the State of Arizona can reduce and end violence against indigenous women and girls." The study committee would establish methods for tracking and collecting data, reviewing policies and procedures, reviewing prosecutorial trends, gather data on violence, identify barriers to providing more state resources, propose measures, as well as propose legislation to address the issues identified.

===== Wisconsin Assembly Bill 548 =====
On October 14, 2019, Assembly Bill 548 was introduced to the Wisconsin State Assembly. This bill would create a Task Force on Missing and Murdered Tribal Women and Girls. This bill received a public hearing on March 3, 2020, but did not receive a vote and was not enacted into law. As the Legislature did not pass a bill to create this task force, Wisconsin Attorney General Josh Kaul, on Thursday, July 2, 2020, announced the creation of the Wisconsin Missing and Murdered Indigenous Women and Girls Task Force within the Wisconsin Department of Justice. Failed to pass pursuant to Senate Joint Resolution 1 on April 1, 2020.

=== Presidential Task Force ===
Executive Order 13898, signed by then-U.S. president Donald Trump, formed the Task Force on Missing and Murdered American Indians and Alaska Natives, otherwise known as Operation Lady Justice, in order to address concerns of these communities regarding missing and murdered women and girls in the United States.

The task force was first authorized in November 2019 and strives to improve the criminal justice response to American Indian and Alaska Natives experiencing violence. Operation Lady Justice is co-chaired by Tara Sweeney (designee for the Secretary of the Interior) and Katharine Sullivan (designee for Attorney General). Additional members are Terry Wade, Laura Rogers, Charles Addington, Trent Shores, and Jean Hovland. Executive Director Marcia Good would assist the Operation Lady Justice task force. The Operation Lady Justice Task Force has specific mission objectives and must submit a written report to the President by November 26, 2020, to include accomplishments and recommended future activities.

Under U.S. President Joe Biden, in February 2021, the U.S. Department of Justice's Operation Lady Justice website augmented existing pages and added many new ones, in coordination with involved other agencies of the U.S. government and with tribal organizations and tribal governments. On May 4, 2021, the White House issued "A Proclamation on Missing and Murdered Indigenous Persons Awareness Day, 2021" beginning

Today, thousands of unsolved cases of missing and murdered Native Americans continue to cry out for justice and healing. On Missing and Murdered Indigenous Persons Awareness Day, we remember the Indigenous people who we have lost to murder and those who remain missing and commit to working with Tribal Nations to ensure any instance of a missing or murdered person is met with swift and effective action.

and detailing the commitments of his administration in this regard, both those already in progress and going forward.

== Activism ==
Indigenous activists have been organizing protests and vigils relating to missing and murdered Indigenous women, girls, and two-spirit individuals for decades. The Native Women's Association of Canada was one of many organizations that created a database of missing and murdered Indigenous women. The community-based activist groups Families of Sisters in Spirit and No More Silence have also been gathering the names of missing and murdered Indigenous women since 2005. In 2015 the Truth and Reconciliation Commission of Canada's Calls to Action also called for the federal government to establish a public inquiry into the issues of MMIW. Prime Minister Justin Trudeau announced the inquiry in December 2015.

=== Women's Memorial March ===
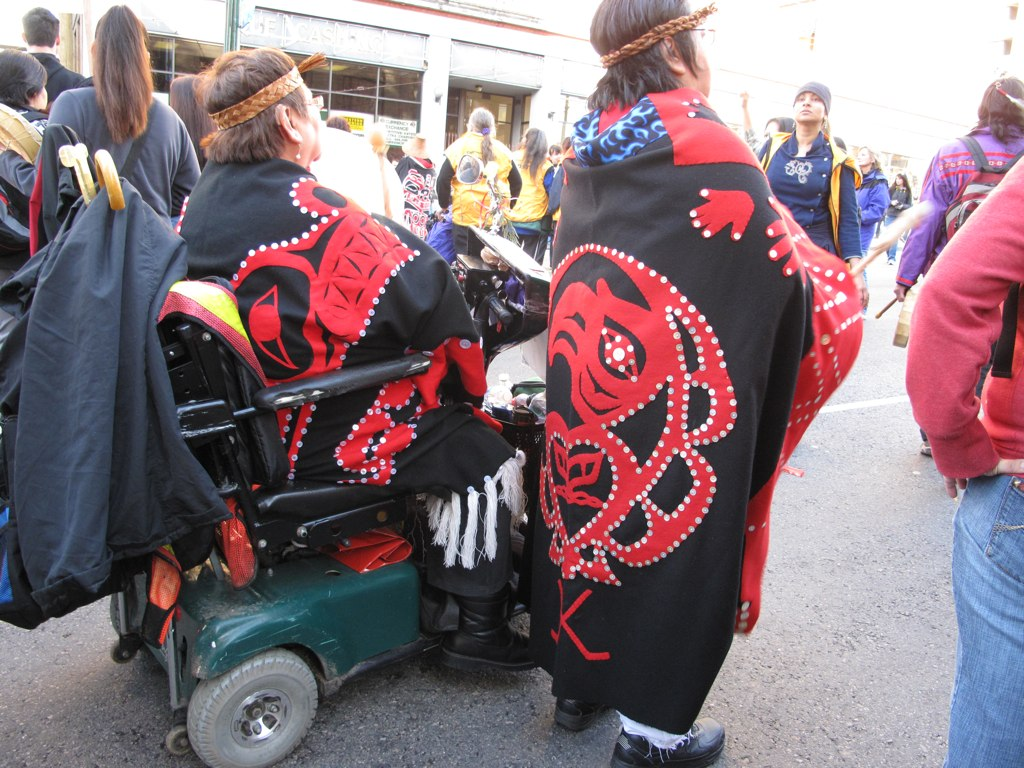
Women's Memorial March Vancouver, British Columbia.

The first Women's Memorial March was on February 14, Valentine's Day, 1992, in Downtown Eastside, Vancouver, an area notable for having numerous missing or murdered Indigenous women. The march was in response to the murder of a Coast Salish woman. The annual marches were intended to commemorate Indigenous women who have been murdered or have gone missing in order to build support for a national inquiry and program of response.

In 2016 the government announced it would undertake such an inquiry. During the annual Vancouver march, the committee and public stop at the sites where the women were last seen or known to have been murdered, holding a moment of silence as a sign of respect. The committee has drawn attention to the issue locally, nationally, and internationally. The committee is made up of family members, front-line workers, close friends, and loved ones who have suffered the losses of Indigenous women during recent decades.

This event has expanded. As of 2017, it was held annually on Valentine's Day in more than 22 communities across North America. The march intends to break down barriers among populations and raise awareness about the racial stereotypes and stigmas that contribute to the high rate of missing and murdered Indigenous women in Canada.

=== Sisters in Spirit Vigils ===
In 2002, the Native Women's Association of Canada, Amnesty International Canada, KAIROS, Elizabeth Fry Society, and the Anglican Church of Canada formed the National Coalition for our Stolen Sisters, an initiative designed to raise awareness about the MMIW crisis in Canada. In 2005 Indigenous women founded Sisters in Spirit, a research, education and policy program run by Indigenous women, with a focus on raising awareness about violence against Indigenous women, girls, and two-spirit persons. Sisters in Spirit collected the details of almost 600 cases of Missing and Murdered Indigenous Women in Canada, including some historical cases that were not accepted by police, and cases where police closed the book on a woman's death despite lingering questions from family members. This was the first database of its kind in Canada in terms of its detail and scope; however, the federal government stopped funding the program in 2010. Critics of the cut say it was meant to silence the Native Women's Association of Canada, the group behind the database. However, Sisters in Spirit vigils continue to be held across Canada every year on the 4th of October.

Bridget Tolley founded the Sisters in Spirit vigils in 2005 to honour of the lives of Missing and Murdered Indigenous Women, Girls and two-spirit persons. This annual event is organized in partnership with the NWAC. In 2006, 11 vigils were held across the country and in 2014, there were 216 vigils. The annual Fort St. John, British Columbia, vigil has been taking place since 2008, honouring missing and murdered Indigenous women and girls in northeast British Columbia. Sisters in Spirit continue to hold an annual, national vigil on Parliament Hill in Ottawa, Ontario, Canada.

=== Families of Sisters in Spirit ===
In 2011 Bridget Tolley cofounded Families of Sisters in Spirit (FSIS) in response to the funding cuts to Sisters in Spirit. FSIS is a grassroots group led by Indigenous women dedicated to seeking justice for missing Indigenous women, girls, and two-spirit persons through public awareness and advocacy. FSIS differs from Sisters in Spirit insofar as FSIS is fully autonomous, all-volunteer, and accepts no government funding. Tolley is Algonquin from the Kitigan Zibi Anishinabeg First Nation. Her activism began after her mother, Gladys Tolley, was struck and killed by a Sûreté du Québec police cruiser while walking across a two-lane highway on the Kitigan Zibi-Anishinabeg First Nation on October 5, 2001. A police investigation into her death revealed no wrongdoing and deemed the case an accident.

However, Tolley claims police failed to inform her family that her mother's case was closed, and that Montreal police were brought in even though the local Kitigan Zibi police department had jurisdiction over the scene and should have been called to secure it. Bridget Tolley has since campaigned for justice for her mother, demanding her case be reopened and subject to an independent investigation by the Province of Quebec. She remains a committed activist for social justice regarding police violence, education, housing, and child welfare.

=== Drag the Red ===
In 2014, the body of 15-year-old Tina Fontaine was found dumped in the Red River in Manitoba, wrapped in a plastic bag and weighted down with stones. Since then, volunteer teams have gathered in boats to search the Winnipeg waterways for the remains of other missing and murdered women, girls, and men, in hopes of finding justice, or at least closure, for their grieving families and friends. Disposal of victims in water is a common tactic used by assailants, as water often washes away the forensic evidence necessary for a conviction.

=== Water Protectors and Land Defenders ===
Because resource extraction projects create threats to Indigenous women, water protectors and land defenders use red dresses, red handprints, and other references to the MMIW movement at the site of blockades or other direct action to raise awareness about this connection between exploitation of the earth and violence against Indigenous women.

== Creative responses ==
At the 2014 Polaris Music Prize ceremony, Inuk musician Tanya Tagaq performed her number in front of a screen featuring a scrolling list of names of missing and murdered Indigenous women.

Documentary filmmaker Kim O'Bomsawin released the documentary film Quiet Killing (Ce silence qui tue) in 2018. The film examined the MMIW issue, and won the Donald Brittain Award for Best Social or Political Documentary Program at the 7th Canadian Screen Awards.

=== REDress Project ===
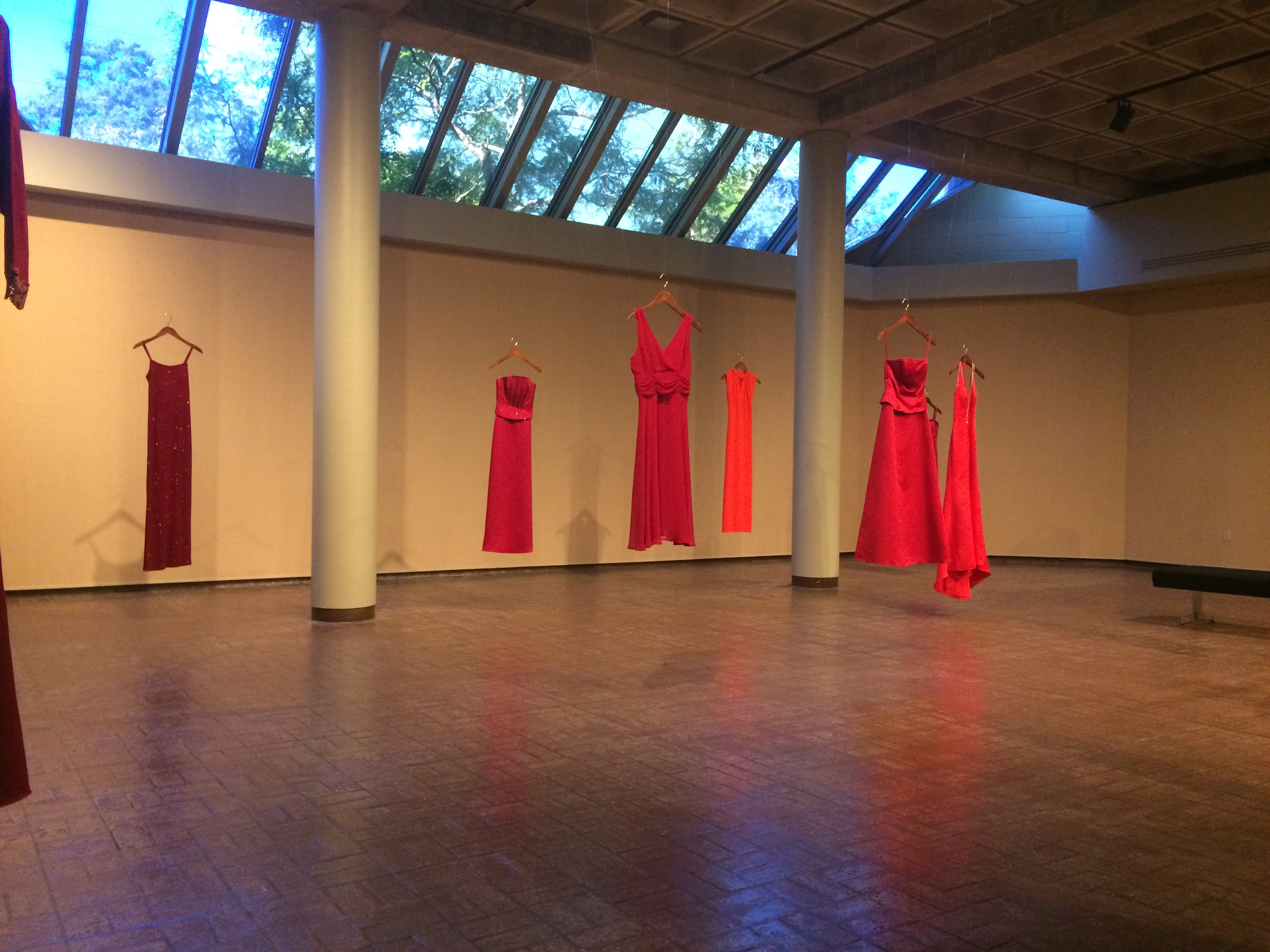
REDress Project Vancouver, British Columbia.

The REDress Project is a public art installation dedicated to the remembrance of the Missing and Murdered Indigenous women. It consists of red dresses, hanging or laid flat in public spaces, with each empty dress symbolizing one of the missing and murdered. Canadian Jaime Black (Métis) began the project in 2000. She told CTV News that "a friend of [hers], who is also an aboriginal, explained that red was the only colour spirits could see.

'So (red) is really a calling back of the spirits of these women and allowing them a chance to be among us and have their voices heard through their family members and community.'"

The REDress Project has been displayed at the campuses of the universities of Winnipeg, Saskatchewan, Kamloops, Alberta, Toronto, the University of Western Ontario and Queen's University as well as the Manitoba Legislature, and the Canadian Museum of Human Rights.

=== Walking with Our Sisters ===
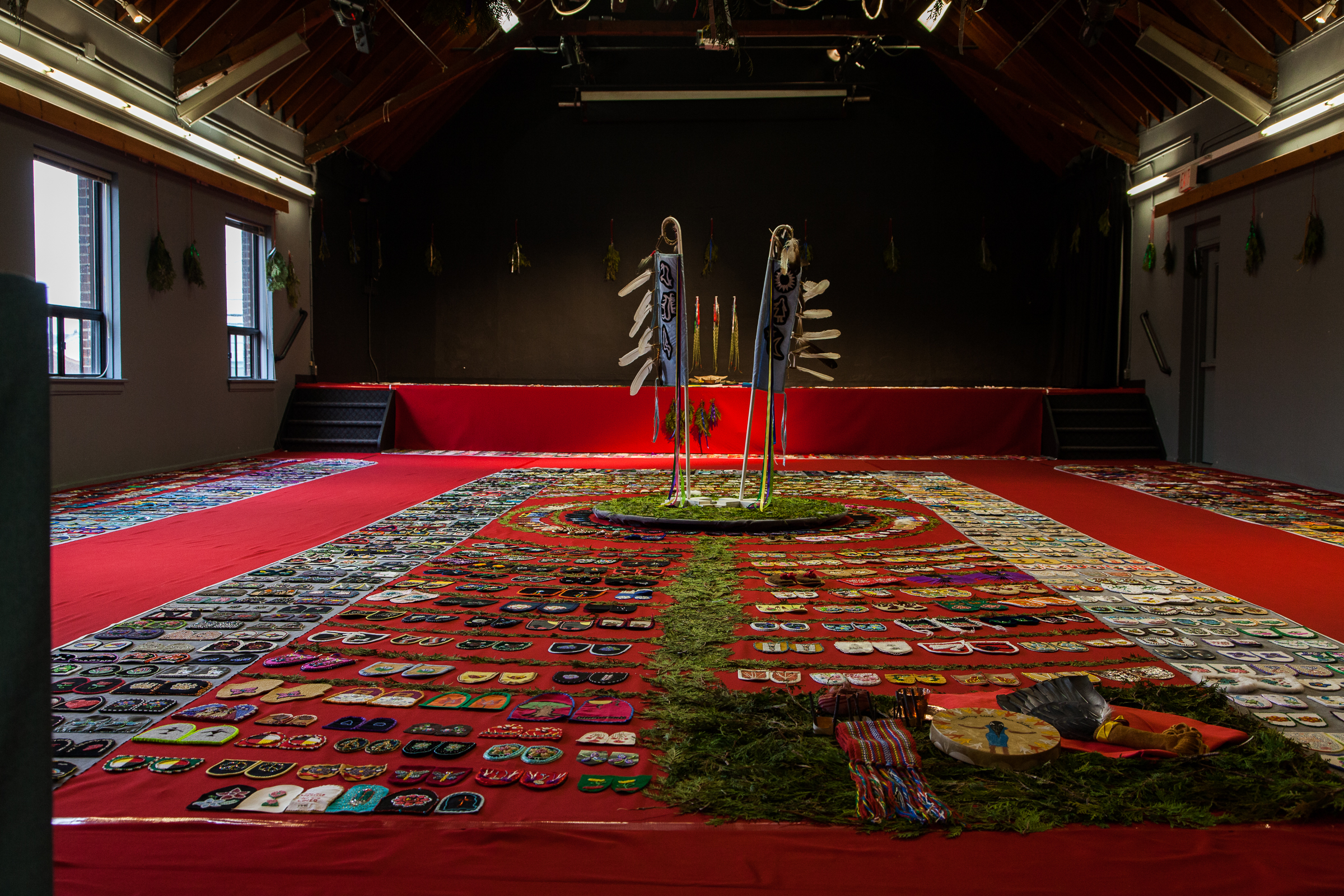
Walking with Our Sisters exhibition in the Shingwauk Auditorium at Algoma University in 2014.

Walking with Our Sisters is a community-based art installation, commemorating murdered or missing women and children from Indigenous communities. The project is community-led, from the creation of the piece to the facilitation of the exhibit at different sites. The hope is to raise awareness on this issue and create a space for dialogue-based community discussions on this issue. It is a solely volunteer initiative.

The art project is a collection of moccasin vamps. A vamp is the extra layer of leather for the top lip of the moccasin, which is usually decorated with beadwork or quillwork in traditional patterns from the Indigenous woman's culture. The installation has more than 1763 pairs of adult vamps and 108 pairs for children. Each pair is custom made for each individual woman reported missing. The vamps from unfinished moccasins represent the unfinished lives of the missing or murdered women.

The project began in 2012, with a call to action issued on Facebook. People were asked to design and create these moccasin tops for their missing and murdered loved ones. By July 2013, the project leaders had received 1,600 vamps, more than tripling their initial goal of 600. Men, women, and children of all backgrounds responded to the call and became active in the project.

This installation consists of these moccasin vamps ceremonially placed on the floor of a public space in a sacred manner. It travels to select galleries and art exhibition halls. Patrons are asked to take off their shoes and respectfully walk alongside the vamps in the gallery, to ensure that the people they represent are not forgotten, and to show solidarity with the missing or murdered women. Booked until 2019, the installation is scheduled for 25 locations across North America.

=== Faceless Dolls Project ===
Begun by the Native Women's Association of Canada in 2012, the Faceless Dolls Project encourages people to make dolls to represent missing and murdered women, and those affected by violence. The dolls are designed as "a process of reconstructing identity" for women who lose individuality in becoming victims of crime. The first dolls were made to commemorate the 582 MMIW documented by the association. They are intended as an artistic reminder of the lives and identities of the affected women and girls. NWAC has brought this art project to universities and communities across Canada, where participants join in making dolls as a form of activism and raising awareness of the issue of MMIW.

=== Inuksuit stone monuments ===
Since late 2015 Kristen Villebrun, a local activist in Hamilton, Ontario, and about ten other Indigenous women have been constructing inuksuit stone monuments on the Chedoke Radial Trail. An inuksuk (plural inuksuit) is a human-built stone structure commonly used for navigation or as trail markers. Inuksuk translates to "in the likeness of a human". The Chedoke Radial trail connects to the Chedoke Creek, a watercourse in Hamilton.

The women began the project in October 2015 when they noticed that shadows cast by previously constructed inuksuit on the trail were lifelike and reminiscent of women. These activists saw an opportunity to use these structures as a way of drawing attention to the issue of the missing women. They have constructed 1,181 inuksuit, working for six hours a day, four days a week. The project has attracted many questions, with hundreds of people stopping to inquire about the inuksuit. The women welcomed the questions, and they announced their intention to continue to build the female inuksuit until the government undertook an official inquiry into missing Indigenous women. In December 2015 Prime Minister Justin Trudeau announced he would initiate such an inquiry.

In February 2016, Lucy Annanack (Nunavik) and a team of women built and placed another 1,200 inuksuit in Montreal, Quebec.

=== Missing and Murdered ===
In October 2016 journalist Connie Walker and the Canadian Broadcasting Corporation launched a podcast titled Missing and Murdered: Who Killed Alberta Williams? The eight-part first season examines the Missing and Murdered Indigenous Women crisis in Canada though the lens of a specific case, the murder of Alberta Williams in 1989 along the Highway of Tears in British Columbia. The series was nominated for a Webby Award.

The 2018 season, Missing and Murdered: Finding Cleo, profiles the case of Cleopatra Semaganis Nicotine.

After she left the CBC, Walker created another podcast called Stolen. The first season, Stolen: The Search for Jermain focussed on the disappearance of Jermain Charlo, a Bitterroot Salish woman who went missing in Missoula, Montana in 2018.

Another unrelated podcast, Missing and Murdered: True Consequences covers the MMIWG crisis and features an interview with Cheyenne Antonio from the Coalition to Stop Violence Against Native Women.

=== Big Green Sky ===
Big Green Sky is a play commissioned and produced by Windsor Feminist Theatre (WFT), which debuted in May 2016 in Windsor Ontario. It was prompted by the outrage over the acquittal of Bradley Barton in his trial for the sexual assault and murder of Cindy Gladue. This play is a direct result of reaching out to Muriel Stanley Venne, Chair of the Aboriginal Commission on Human Rights and Justice, and President of the Institute for the Advancement of Aboriginal Women. Venne's report was submitted to United Nations rapporteur James Anaya. Venne created her report because she wanted to "influence decision-makers who have become very complacent and unconcerned about the lives of Indigenous women in our country."

The play is centred around an RCMP officer who is new to the area. She goes up North to see the aurora borealis or Northern Lights (the "green sky" of the title). While there, she finds out about the MMIW situation – a crisis that, she is shocked to realize, can be so deeply interwoven into the daily lives of so many (FNIM) people, while remaining almost invisible (or at least ignored) by the mainstream population of the country. The play is being gifted by the WFT to any organization or individual wishing to bring awareness to this issue. It is being distributed without royalty fees, providing that all revenues and fundraising efforts be donated to local First Nations, Inuit or Métis (FNIM) women's initiatives.

=== Moose Hide Campaign ===
The Moose Hide Campaign is a British Columbia-born movement that seeks to encourage both Indigenous, and non-Indigenous men and boys to stand up against violence, particularly violence towards women and children. Statistics indicate that when compared with non-Indigenous women, Indigenous women are three times as likely to suffer from domestic abuse. Additionally, in 2019 it was reported that 4.01% of homicide victims were identified as Indigenous females. The campaign, which started as a grassroots movement in Victoria, British Columbia in 2011, has since become nationally recognized. February 11 has been recognized as Moose Hide Campaign Day, and is dedicated to raising awareness regarding violence against women and children. On this day, a fast takes place as a dedication to ending violence against women and children. The purpose of the fast stems from the belief that change can happen and occur when community members are brought together through a ceremony, shifting behaviours and attitudes, leading to fundamental changes for better outcomes.

The Moose Hide Campaign was founded by Paul and Raven Lacerte, a father-daughter pair, who gave the moose hide pins to men of the community as a commitment to end violence against Indigenous women and children. The pins are small squares of tanned moose hide, that symbolize ending violence against women. These moose hide pins symbolize one's dedication and vow to protect Indigenous women and children from violence, honouring, respecting and protecting these people, while also working with others to end the cycle of violence. The idea to create the pin came from the two founders, who harvested and tanned the hide of a moose that came from their traditional territory (Nadleh Whut'en (Carrier) First Nation) along Highway 16, known as the Highway of Tears. The hides used to create the pins today typically come from moose hunts, or from animals killed as a result of road accidents.

Since the organization's beginning in 2011, more than two million moose hide pins have been handed out, and approximately 2000 communities have chosen to engage with the campaign. Throughout the years, various political members have endorsed the campaign, including Canada's prime minister Justin Trudeau and British Columbia's 36th and current premier John Horgan. The campaign has sparked numerous conversations regarding the violence women face, including the need for victim support systems, and steps towards creating safer communities for women. The organization behind the campaign also provides workshops and meeting spaces to start conversations. These gatherings provide both men and women with safe spaces to share their experiences, while also pledging to stand up against violence that targets Indigenous women and children. The goal of the Moose Hide Campaign is to break the cycle of violence, that disproportionately targets Indigenous women and children. In order to do this the campaign addresses the impacts of colonization that continue today, such as the Residential School System. The campaign also aims to bring awareness to the racism that is perpetrated towards Indigenous peoples.

By actively speaking out against gender-based violence, and pledging to stand up against violence that targets Indigenous women and children, the Moose Hide Campaign promotes healthy relationships that include gender equity, while also combating toxic-masculinity by promoting positive ideas of men.

=== In film ===
Some non-documentary films have attempted to draw attention to the problem in several countries. Some examples include the American film Wind River and the Australian film Limbo.

== See also ==
- Human rights in Canada
- Murder of Ashlynne Mike
- Missing and murdered indigenous women in Utah
- Missing and murdered Indigenous women in Wyoming
