= Timiskaming First Nation =

Algonquin First Nation in Quebec, Canada

Timiskaming
- Indian reserve
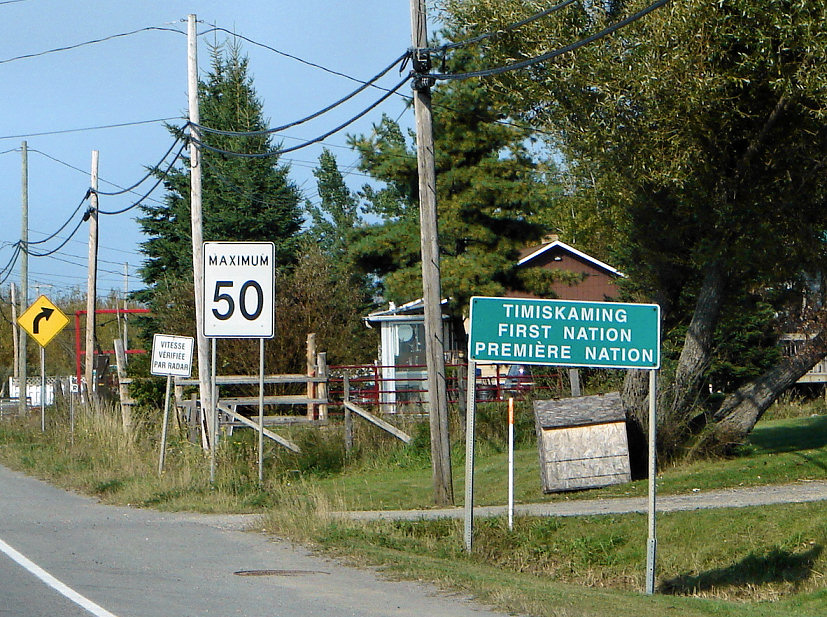

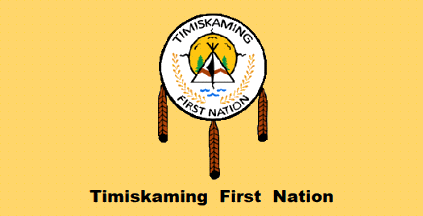
- Flag

- Location within Quebec
- Coordinates: 47°38′N 79°28′W
- Country: Canada
- Province: Quebec
- Region: Abitibi-Témiscamingue
- Regional county: None
- Formed: 1854

Government
  - Chief: Vicky Chief
  - Federal riding: Abitibi—Témiscamingue
  - Prov. riding: Rouyn-Noranda–Témiscamingue

Area
  - Total: 18.20 km^{2} (7.03 sq mi)
  - Land: 18.39 km^{2} (7.10 sq mi)

Population (2021)
  - Total: 541
  - Density: 29.4/km^{2} (76/sq mi)
  - Pop (2016–21): ▲0.4%
- Time zone: UTC−05:00 (EST)
  - Summer (DST): UTC−04:00 (EDT)
- Postal Code: J0Z 3B0
- Area code: 819

Timiskaming (former official designation Timiskaming 19) is a First Nations reserve in the Abitibi-Témiscamingue region of Quebec, Canada, just north of the head of Lake Timiskaming. It belongs to the Timiskaming First Nation, an Algonquin band. It is geographically within the Témiscamingue Regional County Municipality but administratively not part of it.

== History ==
In 1853, following the proposed distribution by Commissioner of Crown Lands, John Rolph, the Governor General in Council, Charles Monck, 4th Viscount Monck, assigned the Nipissing, Algonquin, and Ottawa Indians of the Timiscaming region a reserve of 38,400 acres (15,500 ha), located along the Ottawa River, and originally known as Temiscamingue Reserve. But piece-by-piece, the reserve was reduced in size when the Indians ceded lots back to the government in 1897, 1898, every year from 1905 to 1917, 1939, 1953, and 1955. But many of these surrenders are now being disputed.

On October 23, 1999, the Quebec government officially recognized a name change from Timiscaming to Timiskaming. On July 30, 2002, the Department of Indian Affairs recognized that the reserve's name was changed to Timiskaming.

=== Language ===
Mother tongue:

- English as first language: 81.0%
- French as first language: 13.3%
- English and French as first language: 1.9%
- Other as first language: 2.9%

== Economy ==
The reserve's economy is tied to the adjacent town of Notre-Dame-du-Nord and mostly based on logging, farming, construction, and tourism. There are about 15 enterprises on the reserve. The Timiskaming First Nation administration employs about 70 persons.

== Education ==
There is one school on the reserve: Kiwetin School, providing pre-Kindergarten to grade 8. It had an enrolment of 65 students in 2008-2009.

== Demographics ==
=== Population ===
As of May 2022, the registered population of the Timiskaming First Nation is 2,519 members, of whom 648 live on the Timiskaming reserve and 1,871 live off reserve.

Canada census – Timiskaming First Nation community profile

	2021	2016	2011
Population	541 (0.4% from 2016)	539 (-0.2% from 2011)	540 (6.9% from 2006)
Land area	18.39 km^{2} (7.10 sq mi)	18.48 km^{2} (7.14 sq mi)	18.19 km^{2} (7.02 sq mi)
Population density	29.4/km^{2} (76/sq mi)	29.2/km^{2} (76/sq mi)	29.7/km^{2} (77/sq mi)
Median age	36.0 (M: 35.2, F: 39.2)	32.9 (M: 32.6, F: 33.3)	28.8 (M: 28.8, F: 28.0)
Private dwellings	208 (total)	194 (total)	191 (total)
Median household income	$52,400	$41,472	$37,632

References: 2021 2016 2011

== Notable members ==
- Sherry Farrell Racette (born 1952), art historian, curator, educator

== See also ==
- List of anglophone communities in Quebec
