= Sherry Farrell Racette =

Métis Canadian feminist scholar, author, and artist

- Born: 1952
- Citizenship: Timiskaming First Nation and Canadian
- Board member of: Aboriginal Curatorial Collective

Academic background
- Education: University of Manitoba

Academic work
- Discipline: Native American studies
- Institutions: University of Manitoba
- Main interests: Art history
- Notable works: The Flower Beadwork People

Sherry Farrell Racette (born 1952) is a First Nations feminist scholar, author, curator, and artist. She is best known for her contributions to Indigenous and Canadian art histories. She is currently an associate professor of Visual Arts at the University of Regina.

== Life ==
Racette was born in Manitoba, and is of Métis ancestry. She is a member of the Timiskaming First Nation and taught at Concordia University in 2007. She holds a master's degree in Education, from the University of Regina, and completed her PhD in Native Studies, Anthropology, and History at the University of Manitoba.

== Works ==
=== Academic career ===
Racette is a board member of the Indigenous Curatorial Collective, and her artwork promotes Aboriginal and Aboriginal women's histories. Racette's paintings have been featured in a number of publications, and her work "The Flower Beadwork People" was published by the Gabriel Dumont Institute in 1992. Other artworks on display at the institute, created by Racette, include "Keep Your Spirit Free," (poster) and the collection of "Flags of the Métis" Racette's artwork is also exhibited at the Mackenzie Art Gallery in Saskatchewan. She is a member of the Saskatchewan Arts Board, and also serves on the board of the Saskatchewan Heritage Foundation. In 2009-2010, as a Resident Scholar at the School for Advanced Research, Racette created an exhibition on Material Culture as Encoded Objects and Memory. In 2013, she was an exhibition consultant for the Montreal McCord Museum's "Wearing Our Identity: The First People's Collection." Racette has been mentioned as an artist in the book titled "The Artist Herself: Self-Portraits by Canadian Historical Women Artists."

=== Curating ===
In 2022, Racette was co-curator, alongside Cathy Mattes and Michelle Lavallee, of the first major survey of contemporary Indigenous beading, Radical Stitch, presented at the MacKenzie Art Gallery. Also in 2022, she co-curated (with Cathy Mattes) the landmark exhibition of Métis art and history, Kwaata-nihtaawakihk – A Hard Birth, at the Winnipeg Art Gallery.

=== Writing ===
Racette has illustrated several books, including The Flower Beadwork People (1985), Stories of the Road Allowance People (1995), Flies to the Moon (1999), and Little Voice (2001). She co-edited Clearing a Path: New Ways of Seeing Traditional Indigenous Art (2015).

=== Artwork ===
Racette creates paintings and multimedia works. Her art has been featured in solo, group, and museum exhibitions, and she has won awards for her illustrated children's books. In 2012, she worked with project creator and lead coordinator, Christi Belcourt, to co-curate "Walking With Our sisters", a commemorative art installation that honours the lives of the hundreds of missing or murdered Indigenous women in Canada. The installation has toured since 2013, with exhibitions in Edmonton, Regina, Parry Sound, Winnipeg, Sault Ste. Marie, Flin Flon, Thunder Bay, Saskatoon, Yellowknife, Whitehorse, Comox, Ottawa, Akwesasne, North Battleford, and Brandon. In this exhibition, hundreds of artists donated hand-made moccasins to honour the lives of Aboriginal women.
