= Missing and murdered Indigenous women in Wyoming =

Wyoming: Home to Wind River Indian Reservation, 710 Indigenous missing (2011-2020)

The U.S. state of Wyoming is home to the seventh largest Indian reservation in the US, the Wind River Indian Reservation, located in the west central part of the state fostering 2,268,000 acres of land. It is home to 8,600 Northern Arapaho, and 3,900 Eastern Shoshone. A report conducted by the University of Wyoming's Survey and Analysis Center, found that 710 Indigenous people were reported missing from 2011-2020. Of those 710, 85% were juvenile, and 57% were female. Indigenous people were reported missing in 22 of the 23 counties in the state. Natrona County (28%), Fremont County ( 18%), and Laramie County (17%) are the main counties. Natrona and Laramie counties are the states’ two most populated counties. Eighty-two percent of records for Indigenous missing persons were made outside of Fremont County where most of the Wind River Reservation is located.

== Homicide ==
The current Indigenous homicide rate in the state of Wyoming is higher than the national Indigenous homicide rate. In the years from 2000-2020, 105 Indigenous people were victims of homicide. 71 of them were male, and 34 females. Indigenous people make up 21% of homicide victims in Wyoming, but make up only 3% of the state's population. In 2016, The CDC reported that the murder rate is 10 times higher for women living on reservations, than for those who do not.

== Media coverage ==
There is a statistically significant gap between the amount of media coverage missing and murdered Indigenous victims receive to that of European victims. 30% of Indigenous homicide victims, and only 18% of Indigenous female victims, had newspaper media coverage, whereas 51% of European homicide victims received coverage. Systemic oppression often shows up as implicit bias in both law enforcement personnel and the public.

== Complications in compiling data ==
It is estimated that the true number of Missing and Murdered Indigenous People is higher than what the report found. While conducting this report, the team was met with many challenges and were able to identify and recognize limitations in the data, including inconsistent data collection, mis-classification, and under-reporting. The inability to cross-reference databases has also limited the access to useful information. Many times in law enforcement systems, Indigenous folk are classified in the wrong ethnic group, or as "other." Researchers also requested data from Fremont County Sheriff’s Office, where the Wind River Indian Reservation is located, and the Lander Police Department but did not receive a response from either. 14 possible information resources were identified for this survey, but only 3 were able to be used. Small sample size, and data gaps/inconsistency of reporting were also key factors identified in gathering data.

== Legislative action ==
In recent years, there has been a national movement for Missing and Murdered Indigenous Women. This movement has received increased attention in recent years. Wyoming Governor Mark Gordon established the Missing and Murdered Indigenous Persons Task Force in 2019 after being pressured by advocates for MMIP to address the problem. In response, he signed legislation which focused on improving data collection of missing and murdered people. The bill also required law enforcement to undergo training on cases that involve Indigenous people and required cooperation among law enforcement agencies.
