= Walking With Our Sisters =

Commemorative art installation in Canada

Walking With Our Sisters is a commemorative art installation of over 1,763 moccasin vamps that was created to remember and honor missing and murdered Indigenous women and girls. Each pair of moccasin vamps, also known as tops, represents one missing or murdered Indigenous woman from North America.

== Project ==
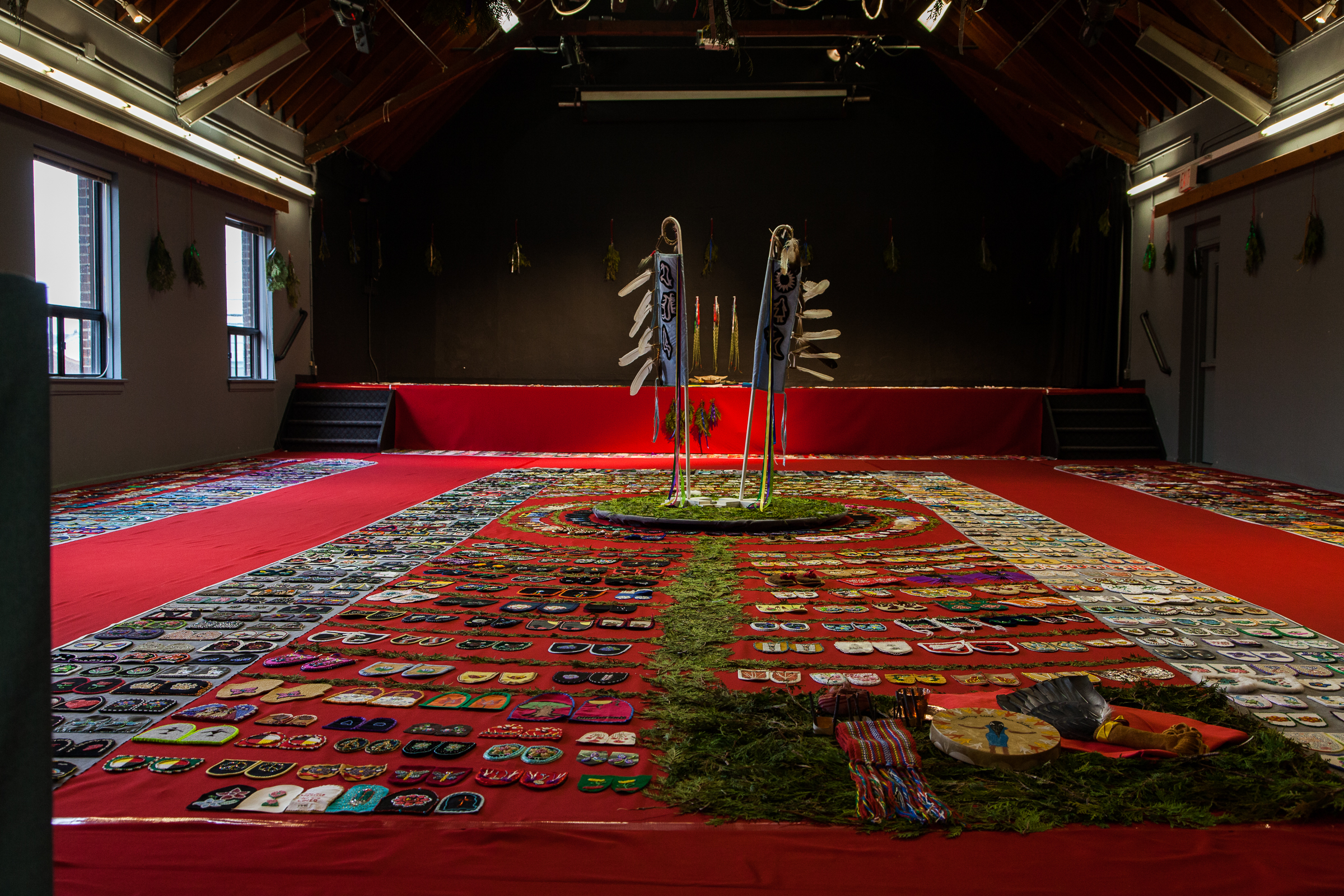
Walking With Our Sisters exhibition in the Shingwauk Auditorium at Algoma University in 2014

The Walking With Our Sisters project was initiated by Métis artist Christi Belcourt to acknowledge the grief families of missing and murdered Indigenous women (MMIW) suffer with, to raise awareness of MMIW and to create opportunities for a discourse in which the issue can be acknowledged across communities in Canada and the United States. This project began in June 2012 with lead organizer Belcourt using social media to invite people to create moccasin tops in memory of Missing and Murdered Women. By July 25, 2013 more than 1,600 vamps had been mailed to Belcourt far surpassing the initial goal of 600. Over 200 individuals from around the world contributed to the project. At last count over 1,725 pairs of vamps have been donated to this project. They were created by 1,372 artists, 331 from the United States, 9 from countries outside of North America, and 1,385 from Canada. In addition to the moccasin vamps sixty audio recordings were submitted. These songs have been compiled and are played as visitors go throughout the exhibits.

In 2014 the project expanded to include 108 pairs of children's moccasin vamps in memory of children who died or went missing while attending a residential school . The children's vamps were added to the exhibition through a similar social media call to the one used at the start of the original project. Families and residential school survivors were encouraged to contribute children's vamps in memory of a loved one. This addition to the project occurred when the Walking With Our Sisters was at Algoma University, which is located on the site of the former Shingwauk Indian Residential School. A ceremony was held as part of the exhibition programming to honor the children being remembered through this initiative and to add the children's vamps to the exhibition.

== Walking With Our Sisters Collective ==
The installation schedule and community outreach for the Walking With Ours Sisters exhibition is managed by a volunteer collective. The work of the collective is overseen by Maria Campbell, an Elder and advisor on traditional protocol. Other core collective members include: Christi Belcourt, Tanya Kappo (Communications), and Erin Konsmo (Two-Spirit/Communications/Youth Programming).

The community support team of the collective includes: Tracy Bear, Lisa Periard, Lisa Shepherd, and Tara Kappo. The support team works with local host organizations to help with regional programming, installation of the exhibit, and on the ground support during the installation. The tour schedule is managed by Christine King and family support is provided by Laurie Ojick. General Project advisors include: Tony Belcourt, Gregory A. Scofiled, Nathalie Bertin, and Shane Belcourt (film and web advisor).

Curatorial team volunteers include: Sherry Farrell Racette, Ryan Rice, and Maria Hupfield. Publication volunteers include: Kim Anderson, Kara Louttit, Doreen Roman, Rebecca Beaulne-Stuebing, and the Gabriel Dumont Institute who is a book partner for publishing. Tracie Louttit and Jodi Stonehouse are part of a volunteer film crew for the project.

== Exhibition ==
During the exhibit the installation space is considered a traditional lodge space. Visitors to the exhibit are asked not to use cameras or other electronic devices, to remove their shoes, and to be smudged before entering the space. Each visitor is offered a tobacco tie to hold in the left hand, which is closest to the heart, before entering the exhibit area, which is covered in red cloth. Visitors move clockwise through the display area, and are asked to stay on the red cloth, not stepping on or over the vamps. At the end, they return the ties, which are later burned in a sacred fire. Native elders and volunteers are on hand to answer questions, or to hear visitors' impressions after the visit.

Exhibition locations have included:

2013

- University of Alberta, Edmonton, Alberta. (October 2013)
- First Nations University Gallery, Regina, Saskatchewan. (November 21 - December 13, 2013)

2014

- Tower Hill Museum in partnership with G'Zaagin Art Gallery, Parry Sound, Ontario. (January 10–26, 2014)
- Urban Shaman Gallery, Winnipeg, Manitoba. (March 21 - April 12, 2014)
- Shingwauk Residential Schools Centre, Algoma University, Sault Ste Marie, Ontario. (May 5–18, 2014)
- Elks Hall, Flin Flon, Manitoba. (June 23 - July 5, 2014)
- Thunder Bay Art Gallery, Thunder Bay, Ontario. (September 19 - October 12, 2014)
- Saskatoon/Wanuskewin (October 31 - November 21, 2014)

2015

- Prince of Wales Northern Heritage Centre, Yellowknife, Northwest Territories (January 9–24, 2015)
- Kwanlin Dun Cultural Centre, Whitehorse, Yukon (April 11–25, 2015)
- Red Deer Museum and Art Gallery, Red Deer, Alberta (June 1–21, 2015)
- I-Hos Gallery, K'omoks First Nation Band Hall. (July 31 - August 15, 2015)
- Carleton University Art Gallery, Ottawa, Ontario (September 15 - October 16, 2015)
- Akwesasne First Nation, Akwesasne Mohawk Territory (November 6–26, 2015)

2016

- City of North Battleford Chapel Gallery, North Battleford, Saskatchewan (January 15 - February 7, 2016)
- Brandon University, Brandon, Manitoba. (February 22 - March 6, 2016)
- Ziibiwing Centre of Anishinabe Culture and Lifeways, Mount Pleasant, Michigan. (April 23 - May 7, 2016)
