= Stories of the Road Allowance People =

1995 non-fiction book by Maria Campbell

- Author: Maria Campbell
- Illustrator: Sherry Farrell Racette
- Subject: Road allowance communities
- Genre: Non-fiction
- Publisher: Theytus Books
- Publication date: 1995
- Publication place: Canada
- ISBN: 978-0920915998

Stories of the Road Allowance People is a 1995 book by Maria Campbell.

The book captures the stories of Métis elders, and is a translation from Michif.

== Publication and synopsis ==
Stories of the Road Allowance People was written by Métis author Maria Campbell, who grew up in a road allowance community in Saskatchewan.

It was first published in 1995 by Theytus Books. A revised edition was published by the Gabriel Durmont Institute in 2010. The first edition was illustrated by Sherry Farrell Racette.

The author translated stories told to her in Mitchif into Metis village oral English The book consists of eight stories, written in the Mitchif common vernacular, or "village English", used by the male story tellers, rather than in standard English. The stories vary thematically including stories of tragedy and humour.

Story titles include "Good Dog Bob", a story of marital infidelity.

== Critical reception ==
Writer Penny van Toorn described the book as "One of the most powerful and brilliantly presented books published in the 1990s."
