= Jo-Ann Episkenew =

Canadian writer (1952–2016)

Jo-Ann Episkenew (née Thom)
- Born: 19 August 1952; Winnipeg, Manitoba, Canada
- Died: 18 February 2016 (aged 63); Regina, Saskatchewan, Canada
- Education: University of Regina (M.B.A.), Ernst-Moritz-Arndt University (Ph.D.)
- Occupation: Educator
- Writing career
- Notable works: Taking Back Our Spirits; Indigenous Literature, Public Policy, and Healing
- Notable awards: YMCA Regina Women of Distinction Lifetime Achievement Award

Jo-Ann Episkenew (19 August 1952 – 18 February 2016) was a Métis writer originally from Manitoba, though she lived in Saskatchewan for much of her life. She held a Masters of Business Administration and a Honours Certificate M.A. from the University of Regina. In 2006, she completed a Ph.D. at Ernst-Moritz-Arndt University in Greifswald, Germany, the first Indigenous Canadian to receive a Ph.D. from a German university.

== Career ==
Episkenew worked as a professor of English literature in the Department of English at the First Nations University of Canada. She also served as the director of the Indigenous People's Health Research Centre at the University of Regina. She was a member of the Chotro International Consultative Group, a group that organizes bi-annual conferences on international Indigenous issues. She was on the Judicial Advisory Committee for Federal Judicial appointments for the Province of Saskatchewan.

Her research included national and international projects in the area of Indigenous literature, Indigenous health and wellbeing relating to the lives of Aboriginal and First Nations people of Canada.

== Publications ==
Her book, Taking Back Our Spirits; Indigenous Literature, Public Policy, and Healing was published by the University of Manitoba in 2009. It won the Saskatchewan Book Award for Scholarly Writing in 2009; and the Saskatchewan Book Award for First People's Writing in 2010.

The book was reviewed by Cheryl Suzack in University of Toronto Quarterly, who stated that it "analyzes the capacities of Indigenous literatures to "de-educate" both settler-colonial and Indigenous communities from the trappings of colonialism". In a forum in the journal Canadian Literature, the book was celebrated as "the second monograph of literary criticism on Indigenous writing by an Indigenous critic in Canada." Five critics published their commentary in the forum, Kristina Fagan Bidwell, Susan Gingell, Alison Hargreaves, Daniel Heath Justice, and Deanna Reder, followed by Episkenew's response.

== Awards ==
Episkenew was awarded the YMCA Regina Women of Distinction Lifetime Achievement Award in 2015. She received the Indspire Award for service to education, one of fourteen Indigenous Canadians selected in 2016.

== Family life ==
Episkenew was married to Clayton Episkenew, whom she had blended family with.

Episkenew passed on Feb 18, 2016 in Regina, Saskatchewan, Canada. She is survived by her husband, children, grandchildren, an great-grandchildren.
