= Maria Campbell =

Métis author, playwright, broadcaster, filmmaker, and Elder

Maria Campbell, OC, SOM
- Born: April 26, 1939 (age 87); Park Valley, Saskatchewan
- Education: Honorary doctorates, Athabasca University (2000), York University (1992), University of Regina (1985)
- Occupations: Author, playwright, filmmaker, English professor
- Employer: University of Saskatchewan
- Known for: Halfbreed, a 1973 memoir taught in Canadian schools
- Notable work: Stories of the Road Allowance People (1995 book)
- Family: [Ben, Ray, Dorothy, Diane, Wil, John and George [Brothers and sisters)]
- Awards: Order of Canada, Saskatchewan Order of Merit, and others

Maria Campbell OC SOM (born April 26, 1939 near Park Valley, Saskatchewan) is a Métis author, playwright, broadcaster, filmmaker, and Elder. Campbell is a fluent speaker of four languages: Cree, Michif, Western Ojibwa, and English. Four of her published works have been published in eight countries and translated into four other languages (German, Chinese, French, Italian). Campbell has had great influence in her community as she is very politically involved in activism and social movements. Campbell is well known for being the author of Halfbreed, a memoir describing her own experiences as a Métis woman in society and the difficulties she has faced, which are commonly faced by many other women both within and outside of her community.

== Background ==
Campbell is the oldest of eight children, and had to drop out of school to care for her siblings when her mother died. She moved to Vancouver at age fifteen, but returned to Saskatchewan in her twenties and became an organizer in her community. In 1969, she published Many Laws, a handbook that explained the issues faced by Indigenous people who move into cities.

Campbell remembers early stages of her life in her community when her and her siblings learned how to hunt and trap, dance, play the fiddle, and learned the use for roots, herbs and barks. In Campbell's settlement, her family consisted of groups titled "The Isbisters", "Campbells", and "Vandals". Campbell's family was a mix of Scottish, French, Cree, English, and Irish. Campbell recalls her experiences at school in Spring River. Her experiences demonstrate the racism that occurred within her community. Those who were white and those who were Métis were divided, and many Métis children were bullied by white children. Campbell had negative attitudes towards school, resulting in feelings of resentment towards her community and family.

Campbell's father, who was a hunter and trapper, became an alcoholic and her mother died around this time during childbirth, leaving Campbell and her siblings on their own. At the age of fifteen, Campbell married a man named Darrel, with the hope that it would allow her to remain with her siblings and be able to provide for them. However, Darrel was abusive towards Campbell and had her siblings taken away. Campbell moved to Vancouver with Darrell, expecting her life to improve however, claims the poverty she witnessed in Vancouver was far worse than anything she had seen in her community in her early life. Darrel abandoned Campbell, and never returned. This left her with no money and no occupation in Vancouver. This forced Campbell into sex work, which seemed like her only option to make a living. In this time, she had to send her daughter to a convent, as she was unable to support her on her own. The difficulties which Campbell had experienced drove her to develop an addiction to drugs and alcohol. Campbell claims that she felt rejected by the city of Vancouver, as she felt they were prejudiced towards her due to being a Métis woman. According to Campbell, survival sex work was her most viable option at this point in her life, a difficulty also forced upon many other Indigenous women. Her involvement in sex work resulted from isolation, exclusion and poverty, due to systemic racism. In Halfbreed, violence, racism and the sex trade are described as expressions of ongoing colonial violence, especially in the lives of Metis women.

Campbell was absent from her community for seventeen years. Upon returning to her community in Saskatchewan, Campbell claims that it was nothing like she had remembered it. Campbell claims she saw much more poverty and abuse in her community than she recalls from her childhood years spent there. Campbell eventually recovered from her drug and alcohol addiction and was reunited with her children. After beginning to attend Alcoholics Anonymous meetings, Campbell became much more involved in activism. Being heavily involved in political activism provided Campbell with a connection to her community, which she felt that she had been previously disconnected with.

Campbell has struggled with a variety of experiences faced by many other Métis women today, including drug and alcohol addictions, resorting to sex work, depression and attempted suicide. Despite these negative experiences Campbell has dealt with, they are also shared experiences. Many other members of her community share similar experiences.

== Halfbreed (1973) ==
Campbell's first book was the memoir Halfbreed (1973), which deals with her experience as a Métis woman in Canada, and the sense of identity that is generated by being neither wholly Indigenous nor Anglo. Halfbreed is an autobiographical work discussing various stages of Maria Campbell's life, including her early life in rural Saskatchewan, followed by her life as a sex worker in Vancouver. It discusses her later life and the challenges she faced associated with being a single mother, as well as her role in the Indigenous rights movement which occurred in Calgary. In Campbell's Halfbreed, the first chapters focus on the early stages of her life, where her sense of identity was created from her community near Spring River, Saskatchewan. Campbell's community had a prominent role in the formation of her identity. Based on the progression of her writing, Campbell became increasingly isolated as her community split apart. Halfbreed discusses the long-standing issue of the urban struggles faced by many Indigenous women. The work criticizes political systems on the basis that they are both corrupt and prejudiced towards females in society. the text highlights the issues of systemic racism and colonial violence, as well as the effects that sex work has on the women involved in it.

The text focuses on Campbell's sense of collective Métis identity, emphasizing community belonging and common Métis experiences. Campbell was born and raised in a Métis community however, uses the term "halfbreed" over Métis due to ongoing debates about the precise definition of the latter, and makes a distinction between the identities "Indian" and "halfbreed." Halfbreed is considered to be a seminal work of Indigenous literature in Canada and has been the subject of much scholarly work, sparking academic debates about pan-Indigeneity, Métis identity, Indigenous status, and the contemporary Indigenous experience in Canada. It recounts the difficulties Campbell faced in her search for self-discovery, including poverty, substance abuse, sexual abuse, and sex work. Halfbreed continues to be taught in schools across Canada, and inspires generations of Indigenous women and men.

The original manuscript of Halfbreed was two thousand pages however, discussion with editors resulted in the reduction of the text to two hundred pages. Campbell had originally included more focus on the dark stages of her life including her time as a sex worker struggling with addictions. It was requested by editors that she include more focus on her early life in order to reduce the appearance of negative aspects of her life. Upon publications, Halfbreed received criticism and rejections on the basis that it lacked authenticity and accuracy.

In May 2018, researchers from Simon Fraser University (BC, Canada) published an article detailing the discovery of two missing pages from the original Halfbreed manuscript. These pages, discovered in the McClelland and Stewart fonds at McMaster University, reveal how Campbell was raped at the age of 14 by members of the RCMP, and how she was prevented from including these pages in her published autobiography by publishers McClelland and Stewart.

A new, fully restored edition of Halfbreed was published by McClelland and Stewart in November 2019 with the two missing pages included. This updated edition includes a new introduction by Métis scholar Kim Anderson, and an afterword by Campbell.

Maria Campbell's Halfbreed consists of anecdotes with humorous expressions. Stories like these, with a humorous effect are important in the upbringing of Métis children, as they are often used in storytelling practices. The humour used in her work counteracts Campbell's negative life experiences, and is seen as an expression of survival. The humorous effect in Halfbreed removes dark aspects describing the struggle faced by many Indigenous populations and reduces perceptions of a continued struggle. Campbell's text is often received as a story of Indigenous oppression experienced in Canada.

== Other works ==
Campbell is also the author of three children's books: People of the Buffalo (1975), Little Badger and the Fire Spirit (1977), and Riel's People (1978). All three are meant to teach Métis spirituality and heritage to Métis children. She has also translated stories in The Road Allowance People to Cree and Michif. Campbell chose to translate her work into what she describes as "Village English", as she felt that this was more representative of her experiences and community, then using standard English.

Her short-story, "Blankets of Shame" is included in the anthology of Native American Women's writing and art, #NotYourPrincess (Annick Press, 2017).

Campbell has also been featured on the CBC Radio talk show Our Native Land.

== Plays ==
Campbell's first professionally produced play, Flight, was the first all Aboriginal theatre production in modern Canada. Weaving modern dance, storytelling and drama together with traditional Aboriginal art practises, this early work set a stylistic tone that her most recent productions continue to explore. It won the Dora Mavor Moore Award at Toronto's Theatre Passe Muraille in 1986 (where it debuted) and the Best Canadian Production at the Quinzanne International Festival in Quebec City.

Two of her plays have toured extensively within Canada and abroad to Scotland, Denmark and Italy. From 1985 to 1997 Ms. Campbell owned and operated a production company, Gabriel Productions. She has written and/or directed films by the National Film Board of Canada (NFB) and Canadian Broadcasting Corporation (CBC), including My Partners My People, which aired on CTV for 3 years. She is coordinator and member of Sage Ensemble, a community theatre group for Aboriginal elders, and is actively associated with the Gordon Tootoosis Nikaniwin Theatre (Formerly Saskatchewan Native Theatre Company) in Saskatoon.

== Political career and education ==
In addition to her work in the arts, Campbell is a volunteer, activist and advocate for Aboriginal rights and the rights of women. She was a founder of the first Women's halfway house and the first Women and Children's Emergency Crisis Centre in Edmonton. She has worked with Aboriginal youths in community theatre; set up food and housing co-ops; facilitated women's circles; advocated for the hiring and recognition of Native people in the arts, and mentored many indigenous artists working in all forms of the arts. Campbell sits as an Elder on the Saskatchewan Aboriginal Justice Commission, and is a member of the Grandmothers for Justice Society. Academically, she has focused on teaching Métis history and Methods in Oral Tradition Research. She has worked as a researcher, meeting with elders to gather and record oral historical evidence of many aspects of aboriginal traditional knowledge, including medical and dietary as well as spiritual, social, and general cultural practices. She has completed the course work for an M.A. in Native Studies at the University of Saskatchewan (though it has not been awarded) and has received honorary degrees from the University of Regina, York University, and Athabasca University.

Campbell has become the leader of many Métis social movements and has become very active in the political community. Due to her moving to the city of Vancouver, and the issues she faced there, Campbell felt as though she became disconnected from her community in Saskatchewan. Involvement in activism and politics has allowed Campbell to reconnect with her childhood community.

== Selected works ==
=== Books and plays ===
- Keetsahnak / Our Missing and Murdered Indigenous Sisters (co-editor) (2018)
- Stories of the Road Allowance People (1995)
- The Book of Jessica (co-writer) (1989)
- Achimoona (editor) (1985)
- Little Badger and the Fire Spirit (1977)
- Riel's People (1976)
- People of the Buffalo (1975)
- Halfbreed (1973)
- Flight (1979)

=== Film and video ===
- Wapos Bay she does the Cree voice for Kohkum in "The Hardest Lesson" in 2009, which debuted 14 June 2010 on APTN
- Journey to Healing (Writer/Director) (1995)
- La Beau Sha Sho (Writer/Director) (1994)
- Joseph's Justice (Writer/Director) (1994)
- A Centre for Buffalo Narrows (Writer/Director) (1987)
- My Partners My People (Co-Producer ) (1987)
- Cumberland House (Writer/Director) (1986)
- Road to Batoche (Writer/Director) (1985)
- Sharing and Education (Writer/Director) (1985)
- Red Dress (Writer) (1977)
- Edmonton's Unwanted Women (Writer/Director) (1968)

=== Radio ===
- Kiskamimsoo (Writer/Interviewer) (1973–1974)
- Tea with Maria (Writer/Interviewer) (1973–1975)
- Batoche 85 (Writer/Interviewer) (1985)

=== Writing about Campbell ===
- Armstrong, Jolene, Ed. Maria Campbell: Essays On Her Works. Toronto: Guernica, 2012. ISBN 978-1-55071-648-1
- Barkwell, Lawrence J. "Maria Campbell" in Women of the Métis Nation. Winnipeg: Louis Riel Institute, 2010. ISBN 978-0-9809912-5-3

== Honours ==
=== Awards ===
- Lieutenant Governor’s Lifetime Achievement Award, Saskatchewan Arts Awards (2021)
- Pierre Elliott Trudeau Foundation Fellowship (2012)
- Officer of the Order of Canada (2008)
- Distinguished Canadian Award (2006)
- Saskatchewan Order of Merit (2006)
- Canada Council for the Arts Molson Prize (2004)
- Saskatchewan Theatre Hall of Fame (2000)
- Chief Crowfoot Award, Department of Native Studies, University of Calgary (1996)
- National Aboriginal Achievement Award (1995)
- Golden Wheel Award, Rotary Club, Saskatchewan (1994)
- Saskatchewan Achievement Award, Government of Saskatchewan (1994)
- Gabriel Dumont Medal of Merit, Gabriel Dumont Institute (1992)
- Chalmers Award for Best New Play (1986)
- Dora Mavor Award (1986)
- Order of the Sash, Métis Nation of Saskatchewan (1985)
- National Hero, Native Council of Canada (1979)
- Vanier Award, Vanier Institute (1979)
- Honorary Chief, Black Lake First Nations (1978).
- Matt Cohen Award (2026)

=== Honorary Doctorate Degrees ===
- University of Regina (1985)
- York University (1992)
- Athabasca University (2000)
- Ryerson University (2018)
- University of Winnipeg (2018)

== Academic career ==
- Assistant Professor at the University of Saskatchewan (current; cross-appointed in the departments of English, Drama and Native Studies, and as a Special Scholar under the Dean of Arts and Science)
- Stanley Knowles Distinguished Visiting Professorship, Brandon University (2000–01)
- Sessional Instructor, Saskatchewan Federated Indian College (since 1998)
- Aboriginal Scholar, University of Saskatchewan (1995)
- Lecturer, University of Saskatchewan (1991–1997)

=== Writer-In-Residence ===
- University of Winnipeg (2008–09)
- University of Saskatchewan (1998–99).
- Whitehorse Public Library (1994–95)
- Prince Albert Public Library (1985–86)
- Persephone Theatre (1983–84)
- Regina Public Library (1980–81)
- University of Alberta (1979–80)
