= White supremacy in Indonesia =

White supremacy in Indonesia refers to two related but distinct phenomena: the racial hierarchy that privileged Europeans under Dutch colonial rule, whose social effects persist in postcolonial Indonesian society, and, since the mid-2020s, the online spread of Western white supremacist and neo-Nazi ideology among Indonesian youth, virtually all of whom are not themselves white. Indonesian researchers and officials have described the latter phenomenon as an instance of non-white youth adopting white supremacist symbols and rhetoric primarily as a framework to justify personal grievances, such as bullying or social isolation, rather than as a result of deep ideological conviction.

== Colonial-era racial hierarchy ==
=== Dutch East Indies racial classification ===
Dutch colonial law in the Dutch East Indies institutionalised a tripartite racial hierarchy through codifications such as the Regeringsreglement of 1854 and the Indische Staatsregeling of 1854 and 1855, which divided the colonial population into three legal categories: Europeans, "Foreign Orientals" (Vreemde Oosterlingen, including ethnic Chinese, Arabs, and Indians), and "Natives" (Inlanders). Europeans occupied the top of this formal racial order and dominated the upper ranks of colonial administration, law, and commerce; Foreign Orientals occupied an intermediate stratum with greater legal rights than Natives but fewer than Europeans; and Natives, who made up the vast majority of the population, occupied the lowest legal and social tier.

People of mixed European and Indonesian descent, known as Indo-Europeans, were generally classified within the European legal category rather than as a separate group, provided they were formally acknowledged by a European father, which set the Dutch East Indies apart from racial systems such as apartheid-era South Africa that maintained a distinct legal category for mixed-race people. Differentiated legal instruments, such as the zonal residency system (wijkenstelsel) and travel pass system (passenstelsel), restricted the movement and settlement of Foreign Orientals and Natives in ways that did not apply to Europeans.

=== Legacy in post-colonial Indonesia ===
Scholars have argued that colonial-era racial classifications continued to shape social attitudes after Indonesian independence, including a persistent association between light skin and social desirability. Academic research on contemporary expatriate communities in Indonesia has found that white foreign residents may receive preferential treatment in social and commercial settings, a dynamic researchers have linked to the country's colonial history.

== Contemporary online radicalization ==
=== True Crime Community and online exposure ===
Beginning around 2025, Indonesian counter-terrorism authorities identified a pattern in which Indonesian children and teenagers were being exposed to Western white supremacist and neo-Nazi symbols, rhetoric and propaganda through online communities, including a Telegram-based group known as the "True Crime Community" (TCC), as well as violence-themed online games. Densus 88 spokesperson Mayndra Eka Wardhana said members of these online communities were exposed to symbols and terminology associated with neo-Nazism, including references to Western far-right terrorist attacks and their perpetrators.

Officials have said that, in most identified cases, the children involved did not display a deep ideological commitment to white supremacist beliefs, but instead used the ideology's symbols and language as a post-hoc justification for violent impulses rooted in personal grievances such as bullying, social isolation, or family dysfunction. Indonesia's National Counter-Terrorism Agency (BNPT) head Eddy Hartono described the phenomenon as an instance of "mimetic violence", in which perpetrators imitate the ideas or behaviour of prior attackers rather than acting on independently formed ideological convictions.

=== Scale ===
By late December 2025, Indonesia's National Police Criminal Investigation Unit reported that 68 children across 18 provinces had been identified as having been exposed to neo-Nazi and white supremacist ideology through TCC-affiliated groups. By 7 January 2026, Densus 88 revised this figure to 70 children across 19 provinces, with the largest concentrations in Jakarta (15 children), West Java (12), and East Java (11). Separately, police said they had identified a related online network involving five terrorism suspects who had attempted to recruit 110 children across 23 provinces.

Some children identified in the investigation were found to possess replica weapons, bladed weapons, or, in a small number of cases, materials for improvised explosive devices, and some had reportedly made plans targeting specific classmates or schools. Two 14-year-old students in Bali, identified as part of the 68-child group, were found to have had no prior criminal record and were returned to their parents' custody following counselling rather than facing prosecution, reflecting the general approach Indonesian authorities have taken toward minors identified in the investigation.

=== Notable incidents ===
==== 2025 Jakarta school bombing ====
On 7 November 2025, a series of bomb explosions at SMA Negeri 72 in Kelapa Gading, Jakarta, injured 96 people. Investigators found that the perpetrator, a 17-year-old student, had assembled an airsoft rifle inscribed with the names of Western far-right terrorists, including Brenton Tarrant and Alexandre Bissonnette, and had worn a shirt referencing the Columbine High School massacre. Densus 88 said the perpetrator had accessed the True Crime Community group prior to the attack, and police later determined his official motive centred on retaliation for bullying rather than sustained ideological commitment to far-right politics.

==== Subsequent cases ====
Following the Jakarta bombing, Indonesian authorities identified several further cases connected to the same online networks. On 23 December 2025, a teenager was arrested in Garut, West Java, for allegedly holding far-right extremist views and distributing bomb-making and weapon-making material to a Telegram-based group; the teenager was reported by acquaintances to be fluent in several languages. On 3 February 2026, a ninth-grade student threw a Molotov cocktail in the schoolyard of SMPN 3 Sungai Raya, Kubu Raya, West Kalimantan; police found symbols and the names of Western mass shooters in the student's backpack and said the student had connections to the same True Crime Community network. On 14 July 2026, a student detonated a homemade explosive device at MAN 3 in Padang, West Sumatra; police said the student later told investigators he had been inspired by the Jakarta bombing.

=== International connections ===
Researchers have described the growth of white supremacist online subcultures among non-white youth as a broader regional pattern extending beyond Indonesia to countries including Singapore, Malaysia, Japan, and India, facilitated by English-language online gaming and messaging platforms. Indonesian police said they identified an international chat community that spread the same violent content to children across several countries, and drew a connection between the True Crime Community network and a school stabbing in Odintsovo, Russia, in December 2025, in which the perpetrator had written a reference to the Jakarta bombing on his knife handle.

== Government response ==
=== Law enforcement and deradicalization ===
Indonesian children identified as having been exposed to white supremacist material are generally classified as "Children in Conflict with the Law" (Anak Berhadapan dengan Hukum, ABH) if no crime has been committed, and are directed toward counselling, monitoring, and family reintegration rather than criminal prosecution, in coordination with the Probation Office, Social Services, and the Indonesian Child Protection Commission. Densus 88 has also worked to identify and take down Telegram channels and other online groups associated with the spread of this material.

== Academic analysis ==
Terrorism researcher Al Chaidar of Malikussaleh University estimated in December 2025 that Indonesian neo-Nazi networks comprised roughly 300 individuals, almost all under the age of 17, and argued that recruiters deliberately targeted minors because their status as juveniles under Indonesian law would result in more lenient sentencing if they were later prosecuted for violent acts. Al Chaidar called on the government to expand deradicalization programs, historically focused on Islamist extremism, to also address far-right and white supremacist ideologies. Researchers at the S. Rajaratnam School of International Studies have similarly argued that Indonesian law enforcement's traditional focus on religiously motivated extremism has left a policy gap in addressing the online radicalization of youth into far-right and white supremacist subcultures.

== See also ==
- Jakarta school bombing
- Neo-Nazism
- White supremacy
- Densus 88
- Dutch East Indies
- Indos in colonial history
- Far-right politics in Indonesia
