= RSIS =

RSIS may refer to:

- Ramsar Sites Information Service, a database of sites governed by the Ramsar Convention
- S. Rajaratnam School of International Studies, a section of Nanyang Technological University

== See also ==
- RSI (disambiguation)
