= RSI =

RSI may refer to:

== Broadcasting services ==
- Radio Singapore International, a former radio broadcaster in Singapore
- Radio Slovenia International, the international service of Slovenian state radio
- Radiotelevisione svizzera di lingua italiana, a Swiss radio and television broadcaster

== Computing ==
- RSI register, a 64-bit processor register of x86 CPUs
- Recursive self-improvement, a concept in artificial intelligence
- Reference Software International, a defunct productivity software developer
- Relational Semantics, Inc., an American software company

== Finance ==
- Relative strength index, a technical indicator used in the analysis of financial markets
- Revenue and Social Insurance number, an identifier used for tax and welfare purposes in Ireland

== Medicine and psychology ==
- Rapid sequence induction, a method of emergency intubation, involving paralytics and sedation
- Repetitive strain injury, a disorder affecting muscles, tendons and nerves from repetitive movements, forceful exertions, vibrations, mechanical compression, or sustained/awkward positions
- Residual self image, the concept that individuals tend to think of themselves as projecting a certain physical appearance
- The Real, The Symbolic, and The Imaginary, a theory in Lacanian psychoanalysis concerning human perception of reality
- Retained surgical instruments, surgical tools or materials inadvertently left inside a patient's body

== Physics ==
- RSI-value, a measure of how well a two-dimensional barrier resists the conductive flow of heat
- Review of Scientific Instruments, a scientific journal

== Other organisations ==
- RSI Corporation, an American safety compliance consulting firm
- RADARSAT International, a provider of data and information derived from the Canadian RADARSAT satellite program overseen
- Red Sport International, an international sports organization supported by the Communist International
- Research Science Institute, an international summer research program for high school students
- Religious Science International, a religious organization

== Other uses ==
- Ṛṣi, a term for an accomplished and enlightened person in Hinduism and Buddhism
- Red Sea International Airport in Saudi Arabia
- Regional snowfall index, a system used to assess the impact of winter storms in the United States
- Italian Social Republic or Repubblica Sociale Italiana, a puppet state of Nazi Germany during the later part of World War II
