= Racism in Quebec =

Racism in Quebec refers to the attitudes, judgments, and discriminatory actions based on race, ethnicity, or nationality that have taken place and continue to manifest in the province of Quebec, Canada. Throughout history, the interactions between English-speaking, French-speaking communities, and Indigenous peoples, as well as the immigration of various ethnic groups, has led to the formation of racial tensions and conflicts at different times. Often, this matter in Quebec has been downplayed as isolated incidents.

The Angus Reid Institute and the University of British Columbia conducted a research series in 2021 to illuminate attitudes toward diversity and racism in Canada. They found that only 9% of Quebecers, compared to 12% of Canadians and 14% of Ontarians, believe that some races are superior to others.

== History ==
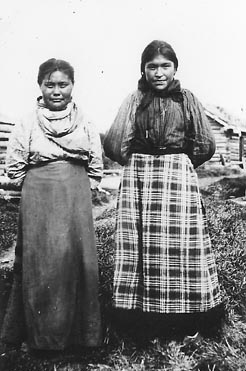
Slave girls, Mackenzie River, Northwest Territories.

In Quebec, as elsewhere, racism has gone beyond theories and manifested in tangible situations, such as in the workplace, housing, and in police interventions. During the 19th century and later the 20th century, racism was openly organized into theories and ideologies. Although there are still racist voices within extremist groups and scientistic circles today, most forms of racism are more subtle and often denied. Most people no longer openly admit to being racist.

In the Canadian historical context, the identity of the Métis has been interpreted in various ways in relation to Québécois identity. At certain times, there was a trend to link the history of the Métis with Québécois identity, presenting the Métis within the framework of the Québécois experience.

Louis Riel, a central figure in Métis history, has often been portrayed in contexts that highlight tensions between English-speaking Canada and the Francophone community, rather than focusing exclusively on Métis experience and culture.

The identity retreat of French-speaking Quebecers can be seen as the foundation for a certain ethnocentrism. Aiming to maintain group homogeneity means that newcomers face a binary choice: assimilate or be excluded. For a long time, immigration in Quebec was perceived as a demographic strategy by the dominant Anglo-Saxon group to emphasize the minority status of French speakers. Expressions of intolerance and rejection, though not insignificant, remain diffused amongst various elements of Québécois culture, political structure, and society. Based on the structure proposed by M. Wieviorka, racism in Quebec is classifiable as a "scattered racism." This can manifest as "infraracism," which is less structured and might arise in the form of prejudices rather than genuine racist attitudes, or it can be more defined and evident in social life or the public space.

While Quebec has had a history of racist groups, these have been less numerous and less organized than in other parts of Canada. They were especially active during the economic recession of 1980–1995, and the influence members of these groups might have within established political formations is concerning.

In 1960, there were shifts in how French-Canadian identity was perceived, and as a result, a more defined Québécois identity emerged. During this period of redefinition, some identities, including those of English speakers and Indigenous peoples, weren't always prominently addressed in public discussions.

=== Colonialism ===
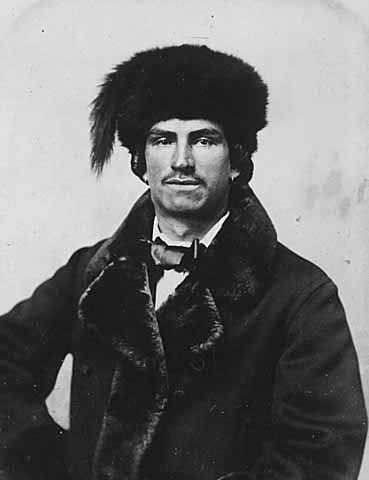
"Mixed-blood (Indian and French) fur trader" ca. 1870. Minnesota Historical Society location No. HD2.3 r7 Negative No. 10222

Records of slavery exist in various areas that later became part of Canada, dating back to the 17th century. The majority of Canadian slaves were Indigenous, and owned by English Loyalists. Subsequently, English Loyalists brought slaves from the United States. Marie-Joseph Angélique was one of the most known slaves of New France (today's Quebec). While pregnant, she set her mistress's house on fire either for revenge or to distract from her escape. She fled with the father of her child, who was also a black slave owned by another master. The fire she started ended up burning part of Montreal and a large part of Hôtel-Dieu. She was later caught and sentenced to death. The Indian Act of 1876, which set up reservations for Indigenous people in the territory of Quebec on the behalf of Alexander Mackenzie's English Liberal Party of Canada, has been debated in terms of its colonial implications. This act has been interpreted by some as a way to perpetuate a colonial relationship with the First Nations in Canada. In Quebec, some politically partisan blogs argue that the Canadian state has not adequately recognized its right to self-determination. There have also been mentions that federal immigration policies may have discriminatory elements, though these claims are debated. For a significant number of racialized minorities in Quebec, there exists a real situation of socioeconomic marginalization and tension. For about two decades, community groups have routinely estimated the unemployment rate among visible minorities, doubling the official figures for the general population. Their estimates have proven to be surprisingly accurate.

In November 2001, there is a 15% unemployment rate in certain youth categories; for equivalent categories of minority youth, the rate exceeds 30%. While other factors might influence this figure, the marginalization resulting from this situation is exacerbated by its visibility, creating a significant risk of deviations and giving rise to emerging neo-racist currents. The table below presents a series of significant events and policies related to interethnic relations, racism, and immigration in Quebec and Canada, from the year 1701 to 2009. The events covered include government actions, social crises, and political decisions that have influenced the country's multicultural dynamics.

Year(s)	Interethnic Policies, Racism, and Immigration in Quebec and Canada
1701	France, along with 39 native tribes, come to a peaceful agreement in Montreal to put an end to their hostilities.
1709	Ownership of slaves is legalized in New France following a directive by IntendentJacques Raudot. Even though the early 17th century saw the practice under the Code Noir (implemented by France in 1685), it persisted in Quebec under British rule until 1833.
1759	The British conquest of Quebec's sees the British ruling over a French populace that outnumbers them five to one.
1816–51	The initial significant influx of settlers to Canada witnesses around a million British, Scottish, and Irish people arriving in places like Quebec City, Montreal, and other ports on the Atlantic coast.
1839	Lord Durham suggests in his review of British North American matters that boosting British migration to Canada would speed up the process of culturally and linguistically blending the French Canadians into the majority.
1879–1914	Measures like the Dominion Land Act (providing free land in 1872), John A. Macdonald's National Policy (introduced in 1879), and the Sifton Plan (started in 1896) make up Canada's grand strategy to promote migration. The aim is to populate western Canada, establish farming communities, get cheap labor for Ontario and Quebec's industries, build the national railroad, and lay down the country's foundational infrastructure.
1880–5	Canada's migration rules begin to place limits on migration from Asia (chiefly by Chinese and Japanese) by setting quotas, imposing levies, and later banning them outright (this is seen with legislation in 1908 affecting Japanese immigrants and the Chinese Immigration Act of 1923).
1874–9	Economic downturns prompt a considerable number of French Canadians to seek better prospects in the US. From 1880 to 1890, about 150,000 (representing 11.3% of Quebec's residents) left Canada. From 1840 to 1930, the total number heading south reached a million.
1923	In the aftermath of World War I, the central Canadian government enacts the Empire Settlement Act to keep pushing for western development via immigration.
1939–45	As World War II rages on, Canada turns away numerous Jews fleeing from the horrors of Nazism. After Japan enters the conflict, Canadians with Japanese ancestry face internment in work camps or expulsion, and their belongings are seized.
1946–61	A notable influx of immigrants from Italy and Britain arrive in Quebec.
1947	The inaugural Federal Citizenship Act bestows the "Canadian Citizen" designation, though it still emphasizes ethnic-based national identity and the significance of cultural consistency.
1952	The Immigration Act is enacted, offering a blueprint for handling immigration and providing substantial authority to immigration officials. Entry and exclusion specifications remain ambiguous.
1956	A federally mandated preference system for immigrant ethnicities emerges. Priority is given to immigrants from the Commonwealth and Northern Europe, followed by a ranking of other regions, with Asia and Africa receiving the least preference.
1962	Updated policies abolish preferential treatment for applicants from Britain, France, or the US, focusing instead on educational background, job prospects, and vocational qualifications.
1967	All discriminatory immigration policies are eradicated.
1968	The "St Leonard" educational upheaval occurs when a Montreal suburb school board moves to replace bilingual classes with French-only instruction. This year also marks the establishment of the initial Quebec Immigration Ministry (MIQ).
1971	Canada gives the nod to its Multiculturalism Policy.
1975	Quebec enshrines the Charter of Human Rights and Freedoms, positioning fundamental citizens' rights above other laws.
1977	The Charter of the French Language (Bill 101) is enacted, linking immigrant integration to the province's prevalent public language.
1982	The Canadian Charter of Rights and Freedoms gets incorporated into the Canadian Constitution, with multiculturalism being a key component.
1986	The Federal Employment Equity Act comes into force, coining the term "visible minority" and compelling federally regulated enterprises to ensure equity for specific groups, including women, visible minorities, and Indigenous communities.
1988	The Canadian Multiculturalism Act is enacted.
1990	The Gagnon-Tremblay–McDougall Agreement, also knowns as the Canada-Quebec Accord endows Quebec with exclusive rights over the assimilation and selection of "independent" immigrants. Additionally, Quebec adopts the Declaration on Immigration and Integration Policy, later refreshed in 2004. The year also witnesses the Oka Crisis – a three-month tug of war involving the Mohawk nation of Kanesatake and the Quebec and Canadian governments over land rights.
2005	The "Canada Action Plan Against Racism" receives federal approval.
2006–2008	The era of "Reasonable accommodation" unfolds. On 8 February 2007, the Bouchard-Taylor Commission is inaugurated and releases its conclusive report on 19 May 2008.
October 2008	Quebec unveils the "Diversity: An Added Value" policy, aiming to ensure all citizens participate in Quebec's growth by countering discrimination on several fronts.
September 2009	Bill 16, promoting administrative action regarding cultural diversity, is presented but meets immediate opposition.
Source: University of Montreal

=== Residential schools in Quebec in the 19th and 20th centuries ===
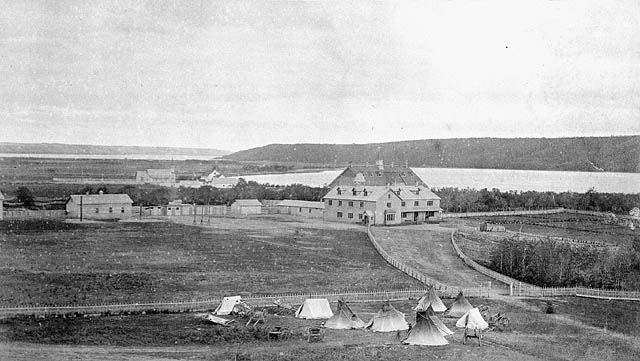
The Qu'Appelle Indian School in Lebret, Assiniboia, Northwest Territories, circa 1885

With the aim of civilizing and Christianizing the Indigenous populations, the English Federal Liberal Party of Canada developed a system of 'industrial schools' in the 19th century that combined academic studies with "more practical matters." Schools for Indigenous peoples began to emerge in the 1840s.

From 1879, these schools followed the model of the Carlisle Indian School in Pennsylvania, whose motto was: "Kill the Indian, save the man." English Canadians believed that the most effective weapon to "kill the Indian" in them was to remove children from their villages, hence Indigenous children were taken away from their homes, parents, families, friends, and communities.

The Indian Act of 1876 granted the federal government responsibility for Indigenous education, and by 1910, residential schools had become the primary strategy for Indigenous education; the government provided funding to religious groups such as the Catholic, Anglican, the United Church of Canada, and Presbyterian churches for Indigenous education. By 1920, attendance for Indigenous people became mandatory, and there were 74 residential schools operating across the country, with only 3 French Catholic residential schools on the territory of Quebec across all time. About 150,000 children, equivalent to 30% of the indigenous child population, were forced to attend these schools throughout Canada.

Following the ideas of Clifford Sifton and others like him, the academic aims of these schools were "simplified." As Duncan Campbell Scott stated at the time, they didn't want the students to "become too clever": "With this end in view, the curriculum in residential schools has been simplified and the practical instruction given is such as may be immediately of use to the pupil when he returns to the reserve after leaving school."

Government funding was often insufficient, and schools often operated as "self-sufficient businesses," where 'student workers' were pulled from classes to do laundry, heat the building, or perform agricultural work. Dormitories were frequently poorly heated and crowded, and the food was not adequately nutritious. A 1907 report, commissioned by Indigenous Affairs, found that 15 prairie schools had a mortality rate of 24%. A Deputy Superintendent of Indigenous Affairs at the time commented: "It is quite within the mark to say that fifty percent of the children who passed through these schools did not benefit from the education which they had received therein." While the mortality rate decreased in later years, death continued to be a part of the experience of residential school. The author of that report to the BNA, Dr. PH Bryce, was later removed and in 1922 published a pamphlet that nearly labeled the government's indifference to the conditions of the Indigenous in schools as "homicide".

Between 1883 and 1996, 139 boarding schools funded by the Federal Government and run by religious groups operated in the country. It is estimated that over 6,000 children died in these institutions from malnutrition, diseases, maltreatment, and neglect.

Anthropologists John Steckley and Cummins note that the endemic abuses—emotional, physical, and sexual—for which the system is now well-known "could easily qualify as the worst thing Europeans did to the natives in Canada." Punishments were often brutal and cruel, sometimes even life-threatening or lethal. Children were sometimes pinned needles in their tongues for speaking in their native languages, made to eat their vomit if they were sick, and had their genitals inspected. The term "Sixties Scoop" (also known as "Canada's Scoops") refers to the Canadian practice, which began in the 1960s and continued until the late 1980s, of taking ("scooping up") children from Indigenous villages in Canada from their families for foster care or adoption.

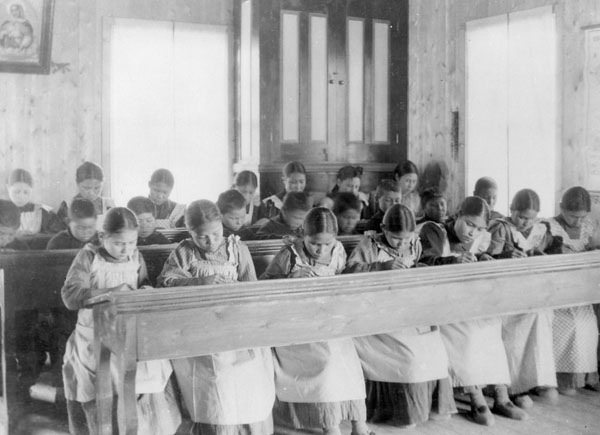
Boarding schools aimed to eliminate indigenous language and culture, replacing them with Christian beliefs. Pictured is the boarding school at Fort Resolution, NWT.

Most residential schools closed in the 1970s, with the last one closing in 1996. Criminal and civil lawsuits against the government and churches began in the late 1980s and shortly after the last residential school closed. By 2002, the number of lawsuits had exceeded 10,000. In the 1990s, starting with the United Church, the churches that ran the residential schools began to issue formal apologies. In 1998, the Canadian government issued the Statement of Reconciliation, committing CAD $350 million in support of a community-based healing strategy to address the healing needs of individuals, families, and communities arising from the legacy of physical and sexual abuse in residential schools. The money was used to launch the Aboriginal Healing Foundation.

In 2007, the government, churches, and the Assembly of First Nations and Inuit organizations reached the Indian Residential Schools Settlement Agreement, which acknowledged the physical and sexual abuses suffered by students and established a Truth and Reconciliation Commission to document the history and lasting impacts of the schools. Canadian Prime Minister Justin Trudeau described the forced assimilation of Indigenous minors in these boarding schools as Canada's "greatest mistake". Over 1,200 unmarked graves were recently discovered on the grounds of these former institutions.

=== Contemporary era ===
The concept of systemic racism refers to structures and policies that, intentionally or not, create inequalities or discrimination based on race. There are reports and studies suggesting discrimination in various sectors, such as employment, housing, and the judicial system. For instance, the Viens Commission examined the relations between Indigenous people and public services in Quebec, and found evidence of discrimination. In 1988, the Human Rights Commission of Quebec initiated a public inquiry into allegations of discriminatory treatment and racist behaviors by the police towards visible and ethnic minorities. This action was the result of rising tensions between Black communities and police services, marked by interventions, arrests, and tragically, the death of young individuals during police operations.

The final report offered recommendations aimed at addressing situations and practices with discriminatory impacts, and to allow policymakers to adapt to the new reality of a now multi-ethnic society. The primary goal was to create conditions that favored improving relations between law enforcement and a society based on human rights, especially in terms of equality rights, regardless of ethnic origin. Three years after the release of this report, and following a coroner's recommendation after the death of a young Black individual, a task force was established to study the relations between the Black community and the Montreal city police. This committee presented its report in December 1991.

==== 1995 Quebec referendum ====
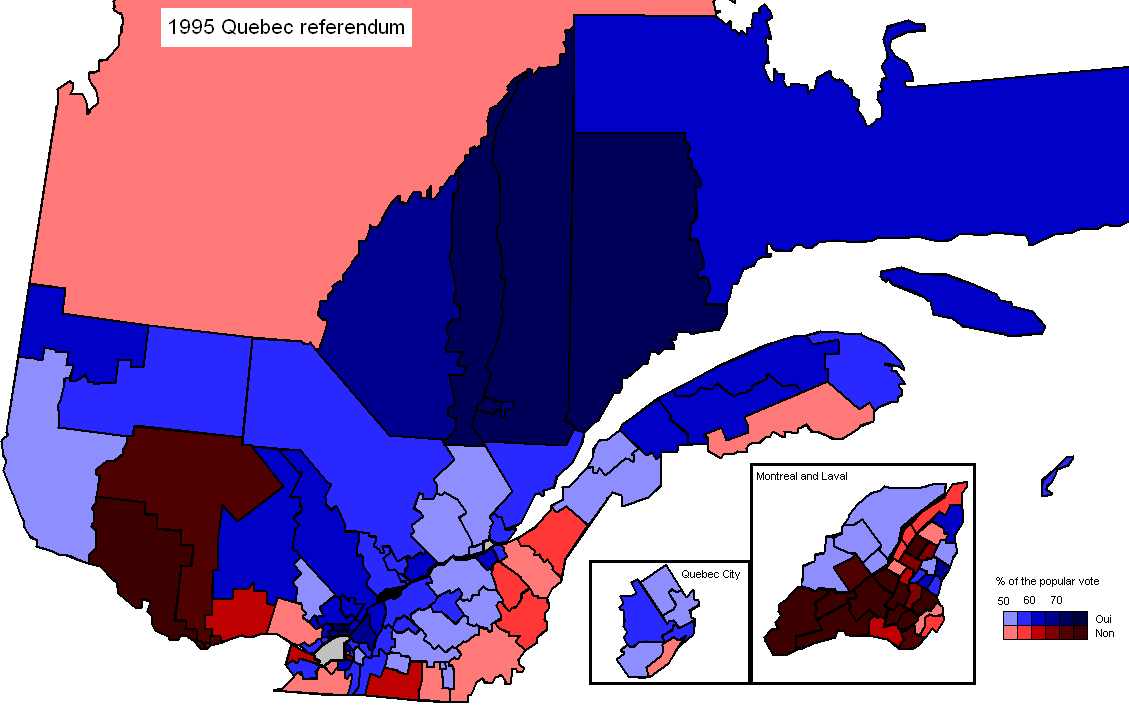
Results by districts. In bluish tones, the "YES"; in reddish tones, the "NO".

The 1995 referendum in Quebec is noted as a pivotal moment in the evolution of political discourse on racism in the province. Following the narrow rejection of Quebec's independence proposal, the then Prime Minister, Jacques Parizeau, shocked many by attributing the defeat to "money and ethnic votes", a statement that left a deep impression on the immigrant community and the ethnic minorities of Quebec. After Parizeau's comment, Montreal-born singer Allison Russell recalled during a 2022 performance how it was to live in the city after those words. Russell, who is of African Canadian descent, shared traumatic experiences of harassment and discrimination. The young artist, who was 15 years old at the time of the referendum, claimed that the remarks fueled racist acts on the streets and contributed to her decision to move out of Quebec.

Aly Ndiaye, historian and rapper also known as Webster, identifies the referendum's defeat and Parizeau's comment as a turning point in Québécois nationalism. According to Ndiaye, the Québécois nationalism of the 1960s and 1970s was geared towards a progressive and inclusive vision, inspired by decolonization movements and global revolutions. However, following the referendum, this nationalism began to become more insular and exclusive. Fo Niemi, director of the Montreal-based, Research-Action Center on Race Relations (CRARR), also noticed an increase in hate calls following the referendum. Niemi, who founded CRARR in 1983, described how the center received numerous hate calls in the days after the vote.

Echoes of the 1995 referendum still resonate in contemporary political discourse in Quebec. In a recent election, statements on immigration made by Coalition Avenir Québec candidate, Jean Boulet, and the party leader, François Legault, revived tensions similar to those experienced in 1995. Evelyn Calugay, executive director of PINAY, a Filipino women's rights group, recalls discriminatory remarks directed at her community and the Chinese community in 1995. According to Calugay, the exclusionary rhetoric persists, and minorities and the marginalized continue to be easy targets for scapegoating in political discourses.

==== Anti-racist policies in Quebec (1990–2010) ====
In the province of Quebec, discussions surrounding racism and discrimination were largely missing from formalized discourse. Official government communications, like the 1990 "Immigration and Integration Policy" and the 1998 "Educational and Intercultural Integration Policy", scarcely touched on racism. In these documents, the issue was depicted more as possible individual misconduct rather than a widespread systematic issue. Quebec's Bill 112, also known as the anti-poverty legislation, along with the National Strategy to Combat Poverty and Social Exclusion, recognized 'immigrants' and 'visible minorities' as susceptible populations. Yet, these documents did not delve into the sociological interplay between racism, discrimination, social disparities, and exclusion.

Traditionally, there was hesitancy within Quebec to directly tackle the subject of racism. Institutional reactions to such issues have been inconsistent and sometimes non-committal. For the most part, Quebec's governmental bodies would only respond to racism when it culminated in heightened racial tension or physical altercations. In 2006's summer, a commission was established by the Quebec government to delve into issues of racism and discrimination. Public consultations were initiated based on a document named Towards a government policy to combat racism and discrimination, a regional continuation of Canada's 2005 Action Plan Against Racism. It wasn't until after the proceedings of the Bouchard-Taylor Commission, formally known as the Consultation Commission on Accommodation Practices Related to Cultural Differences, that an official governmental policy in this domain came into existence. November 2008 saw the Quebec Liberal government unveil Diversity: An Added Value: Government policy to promote the participation of all in Quebec's development. This policy encompassed a broad spectrum of initiatives, ranging from education, prevention, institutional mobilization, victim support, to countering racist aggressions.

Aiming to execute particular facets of the aforementioned action plan, in September 2009, the Minister of Immigration, Yolande James, presented Bill 16. This legislation resurrected the ongoing debate on 'reasonable accommodation'. Nevertheless, the bill's progression was halted indefinitely. Another prominent challenge pertains to the concept of 'racial profiling', especially in interactions between law enforcement and certain racialized communities. A notable incident occurred in the summer of 2008 in Montréal Nord. A clash between the police and locals led to a young Latino's fatal shooting, subsequently triggering unrest in the area. This led the Human Rights and Youth Rights Commission (cdpdj) to initiate public consultations on racial profiling. The cdpdj stated that they had processed around 60 complaints from throughout Quebec and presented approximately 10 of these cases to the Human Rights Tribunal. Reports from these consultations are anticipated to push the government towards crafting a more refined policy and possibly new legislation to counteract racism.

==== Elections ====
During the 2019 Canadian federal election in Quebec, a man in Montreal, Quebec, told Sikh politician Jagmeet Singh New Democratic Party NDP leader to cut off his turban to look more Canadian during a campaign stop. Singh replied that Canadians "look like all sorts of people" before walking off.

The NDP lost all but one of its seats in Quebec, it was suggested that Jagmeet Singh's Sikhism and Race may have been negatively received by voters in the context of the Quebec ban on religious symbols.

Dominique Anglade was the first woman to lead the Quebec Liberal Party, and the first Black woman to lead a provincial party in Quebec.

Anglade led the Liberals into the 2022 Quebec general election, The Liberals dropped to their lowest raw seat count since 1956, their lowest percentage of seats won since 1948 and their lowest share of the popular vote in their history.

=== Pope Francis' visit ===
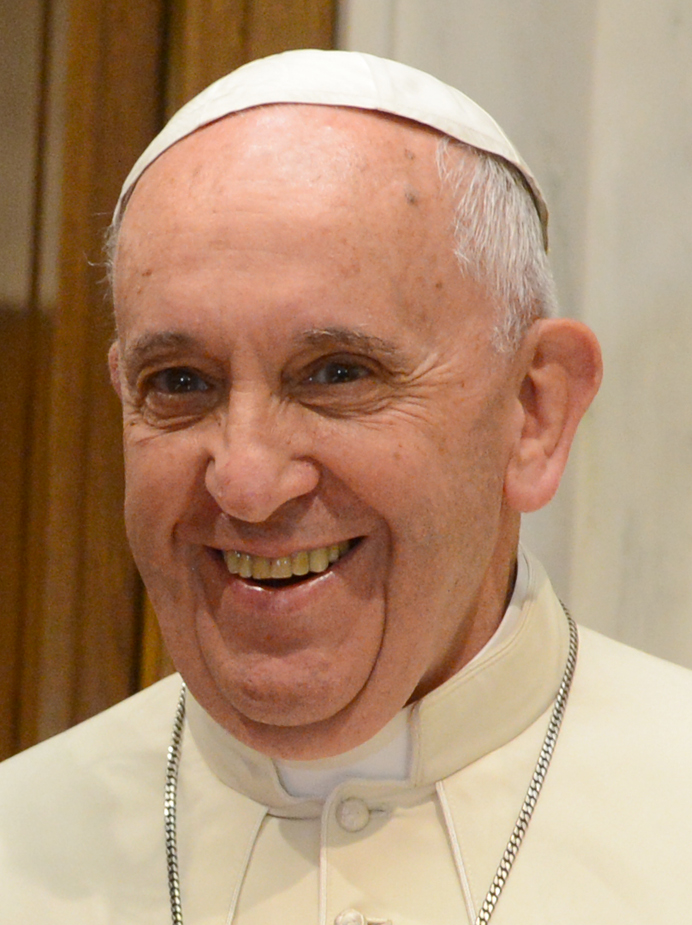
Pope Francis in 2015

In 2023, during his trip to Canada, Pope Francis marked a significant phase of his stay in Quebec, where he held key meetings and addressed the relationship between the Catholic Church and the indigenous peoples of the country. At the beginning of his activities in the province, the Pope was received at the Quebec Citadel by the Governor General, Mary Simon. A figure of particular significance, Simon, of Inuk descent, made history in 2021 by becoming the first indigenous leader to be sworn in as Governor General.

After a 15-minute dialogue with Simon, Pope Francis held a meeting of approximately 25 minutes with the Canadian Prime Minister, Justin Trudeau. In their subsequent communication, Trudeau emphasized that the Pope "acknowledged the abuses experienced in residential schools which resulted in cultural destruction, loss of lives, and ongoing trauma suffered by indigenous peoples across this country". At the end of these meetings, the Pope delivered a speech addressed to the political, social, and indigenous authorities of the province.

Francis's visit to Quebec was marked by the Church's desire to apologize to indigenous peoples for the abuses committed in Catholic institutions. In a message, the Pope said: "I ask for forgiveness for the way many members of the Church and religious communities collaborated, including through indifference, in these projects of cultural destruction and forced assimilation". This message resonated strongly in Quebec, where the history of residential schools and the relationship with indigenous peoples have left deep scars. The Pope's words, awaited by many, marked a moment of reflection and hope in the process of reconciliation and healing between the Church and the indigenous communities of Quebec.

==== Reactions ====
During his visit, survivors and descendants of the victims expressed their hope for a stronger condemnation gesture from the leader of the Catholic Church. There were demands for the return of indigenous art objects held in the Vatican and for the opening of boarding school archives. In a ceremony at the national shrine of Sainte-Anne-de-Beaupré, a banner called for the cancellation of the "doctrine of discovery". The next day, in his homily at Notre-Dame cathedral in Quebec, Francisco denounced the idea of cultural superiority and colonialism.

Despite reconciliation efforts, some figures, like Kilikvak Kabloona, president of an indigenous organization, pointed out that the Pope's apology was not comprehensive enough as it did not directly address the "sexual abuses" suffered by the indigenous in Quebec.

== Dual condition of minority and majority among Francophones ==
Historically, the relationship between Quebec and the rest of Canada has seen racism evolve, particularly due to the shift of Francophones in Quebec transitioning from being a minority (French Canadians) to becoming the majority (identified as Quebeckers or Québécois). The enduring tension between Francophone and English-speaking Canadians has shaped inter-ethnic relations, often structured in a hierarchical manner, known as the 'vertical mosaic'. The dynamics between these two pivotal groups, sometimes coloured by neo-racism, have considerably influenced their stance on immigration and indigenous matters.

In the context of the 1960s Quebec, where ethnic and social divisions demarcated Francophones from English speakers, some French Canadians harbored reservations towards immigrants. These immigrants, aiming for upward social mobility, predominantly assimilated into the English-speaking community. During this era, English speakers predominated in Montreal's economic spheres, occupied prime residential locations, and held a notable presence across Canada. They also established comprehensive systems to assimilate immigrants into their community. French Canadians, viewing themselves as an oppressed 'minority', saw immigration as a looming threat inadequately managed by the Quebec government. Hence, Quebec sought to play an active role in selecting and integrating immigrants into the Francophone majority, envisioning immigration as a tool to offset the demographic and linguistic dwindling of Francophones in North America.

Subsequently, the shift of Francophones to a 'majority' status steered a prevailing civic and intercultural narrative about the assimilation of immigrants into the majority community. With the ascendancy of the Parti Québécois in 1976, the normative rhetoric began to move away from its formerly combative and anti-colonial tones. By the late 1980s, marked by the advent of neoliberalism, discourses critically analyzing oppressive power dynamics virtually vanished. The emphasis pivoted from highlighting the 'oppressive relations' endured by minority factions (including historically marginalized Francophone French-Canadians) to assimilating these minorities into the newfound Francophone majority. The narrative of minority emancipation transformed into one of majority national affirmation. Between the 1980s and 2006, racism, as a subject, became notably absent from Quebec's normative dialogues, only making sporadic appearances in official policies. For an extended period, conceding the presence of racism through public stances was tantamount to admitting the failure of Quebec's assimilation model. Yet, the "reasonable accommodation" discourse (2006–08) underscored the negative impacts of Quebec-Canada dynamics on ethnic minorities' treatment.

This "reasonable accommodation" discourse, persisting over two years in Quebec's media, highlighted the repercussions of the power dynamics between Quebec and Canada on the treatment of ethnic minorities. The debate unearthed prevalent perceptions among Montreal's inhabitants and those in other Quebec regions, exposing certain gaps in their understanding of immigration realities, as well as initiatives geared towards integration and human rights.

=== Xenophobia as a political strategy ===
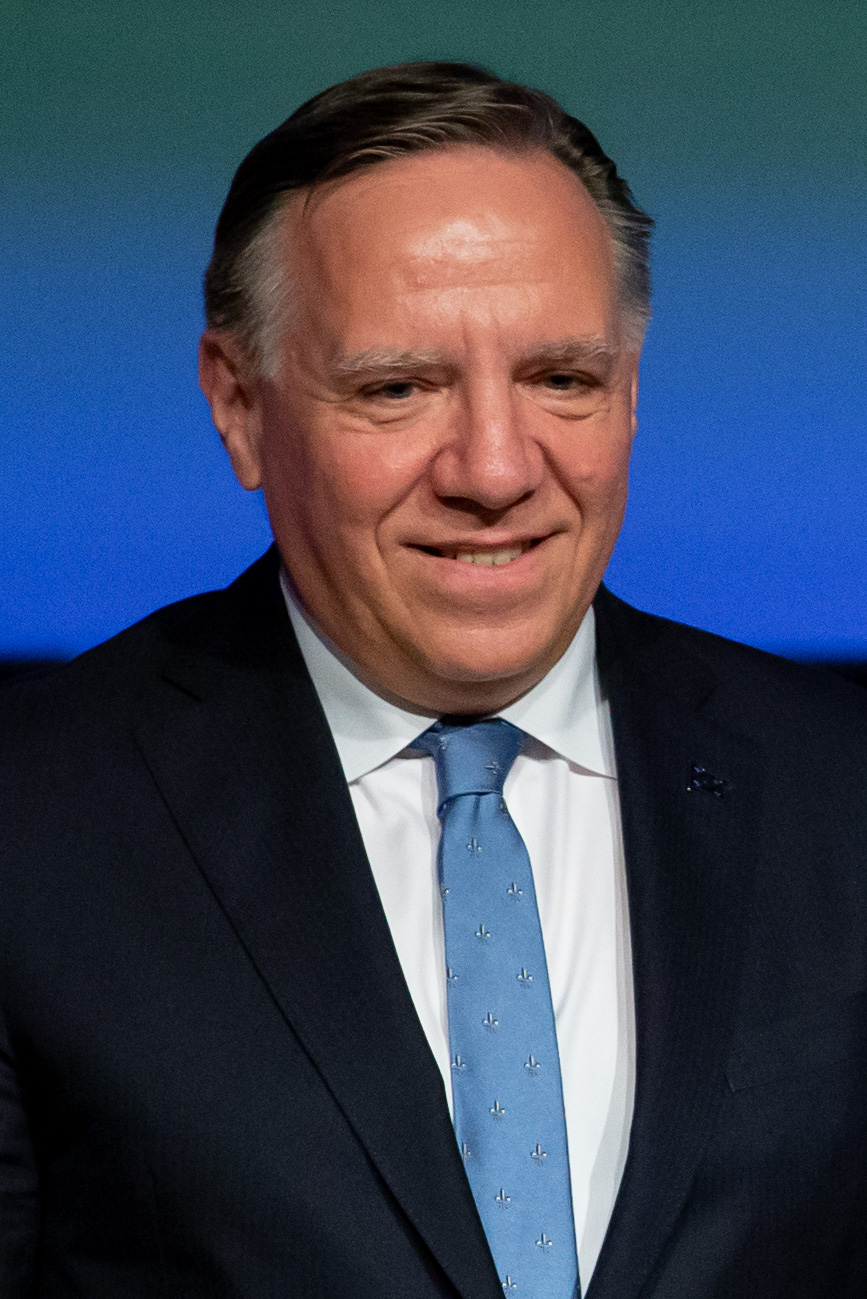
François Legault, leader of the CAQ

The motto of the province of Quebec, "I remember" (Je me souviens in French), is inscribed on all vehicle license plates circulating in that region of Canada. Despite its omnipresence, the exact meaning of the motto is a matter of debate. However, experts agree that it represents the importance that Québécois society places on collective memory, its history, and its traditions.

One of Quebec's most deeply rooted traditions, especially in its metropolis, Montreal, is the welcoming of immigrants, who have played a fundamental role in shaping its identity. Therefore, the electoral victory in 2018 of the Coalition Avenir Québec (CAQ, translated as "Coalition Future of Quebec"), which based part of its campaign on immigration, was particularly alarming. This political formation significantly increased its parliamentary representation, going from 21 seats to 74, ensuring an absolute majority. It is the first time since 1970 that neither the liberals nor the separatists have taken control of the provincial government.

The concern lies not so much in the specific proposals of the CAQ, which some European xenophobic parties might consider moderate, but in the introduction of a previously marginal debate. François Legault, leader of the CAQ, argued that "Quebec has exceeded its integration capacity," proposing a reduction in the number of admitted immigrants and stricter controls in various migration categories. The most controversial proposal is the implementation of a French and culture exam after three years of residence in the province, with the risk of expulsion if not passed.

This position has been strongly criticized by Quebec's business sector, which argues the need for foreign workers to support the province's economy. With an unemployment rate of 5.3%, close to full employment, and an economic growth of 3%, the Montreal Chamber of Commerce has pointed out the existence of 100,000 vacant job positions due to the lack of qualified candidates. Legault's proposals could, consequently, have a negative impact on the Quebec economy.

The political situation in Quebec seems to reflect a global trend where leaders like Matteo Salvini, Viktor Orbán, and Donald Trump have popularized xenophobic discourses in regions where they previously lacked influence. It is a reminder that Quebec, a land traditionally welcoming to immigrants, faces new challenges in the contemporary political landscape.

As Canada seeks to strengthen its commitment to immigration, the federal government plans to welcome a record number of new immigrants, adding 1.45 million to its 39 million population by 2023. While immigration has caused divisions and the rise of political extremism in other Western countries, there is a widespread consensus in Canada about its value. However, Quebec has been a notable exception, with politicians exacerbating anti-immigrant sentiments, capitalizing on Franco-Quebecer voters' fears about the loss of their cultural identity.

== Systemic discrimination against indigenous peoples in Quebec ==
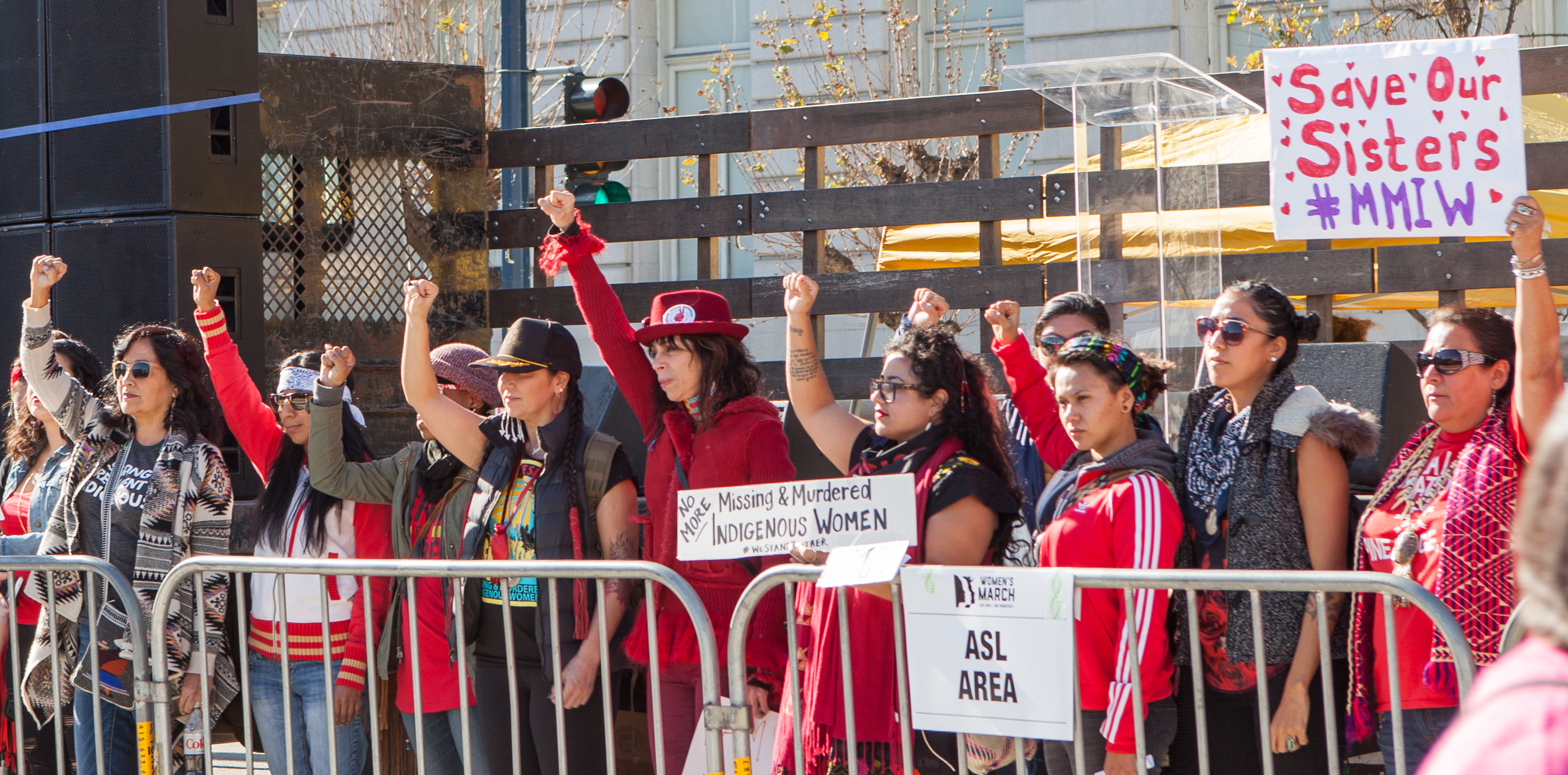
Activists for Missing and Murdered Indigenous Women (MMIW) at the 2018 Women's March

In Quebec, the issue of discrimination against indigenous communities has been the subject of intense analysis. Data from the Canadian Centre for Justice Statistics reveal that, although Indigenous peoples represent approximately 3% of the general population, they make up 19% of federal inmates. Moreover, between 1997 and 2000, the likelihood of an Indigenous person being charged with homicide was ten times higher compared to non-Indigenous individuals. Despite these alarming figures, they represent only a fraction of the broader problem.

Beverly Jacobs, president of the Native Women's Association of Canada, suggests that the side effects of colonization and generations of discrimination, poverty, and abuse have led many in the indigenous community to conflicts with the justice system. Ed McIsaac, from the Office of the Investigator for Penal Institutions in Canada, agrees with this perspective, pointing out how socioeconomic conditions impact education, health, and employment, leading more people into the criminal justice system.

Beyond social and economic issues, there is evident discrimination within the judicial system towards the indigenous people. Mr. McIsaac states that there's evidence of systemic discrimination in the administration of justice. According to the United Nations Human Rights Council, discrimination doesn't need to be intentional to be considered as such. Biases against native peoples, whether by the police or judges, can result in discrimination, even if it's not deliberate. In 2005, the United Nations Human Rights Committee urged Canada to address human rights violations, especially against the indigenous population. Furthermore, the United Nations Committee on the Elimination of Racial Discrimination expressed similar concerns, focusing on inequalities in the justice system. On a national level, Canada began implementing solutions. The First Nations Policing Policy, initiated in 1992, is an effort for indigenous communities to have more control over policing on their lands. Additionally, the government created committees and commissions to address the problems faced by indigenous peoples and began adapting its policies to be more inclusive.

In Quebec, an ethnographic study carried out in Sept-Îles between 2005 and 2009 highlights racist practices and discourses against the Innu that don't correspond to a coherent and unified system but to diverse and contradictory logics. Thus, laws and public policies treat indigenous people with racialized positions and are thus akin to a "kind of state racism". According to the study, the desire to exterminate indigenous peoples continues, but is expressed both by an explicit desire for assimilation, based on a universalist ideology – where a certain evolutionism is found – and by absolute relativism, which confines indigenous peoples to an immutable culture, excluding them from the contemporary world. Thus, "the Innu are kept in precarious jobs and poorly paid because of the alleged fault of their "culture" alien to wage labor".

=== Joyce Echaquan ===
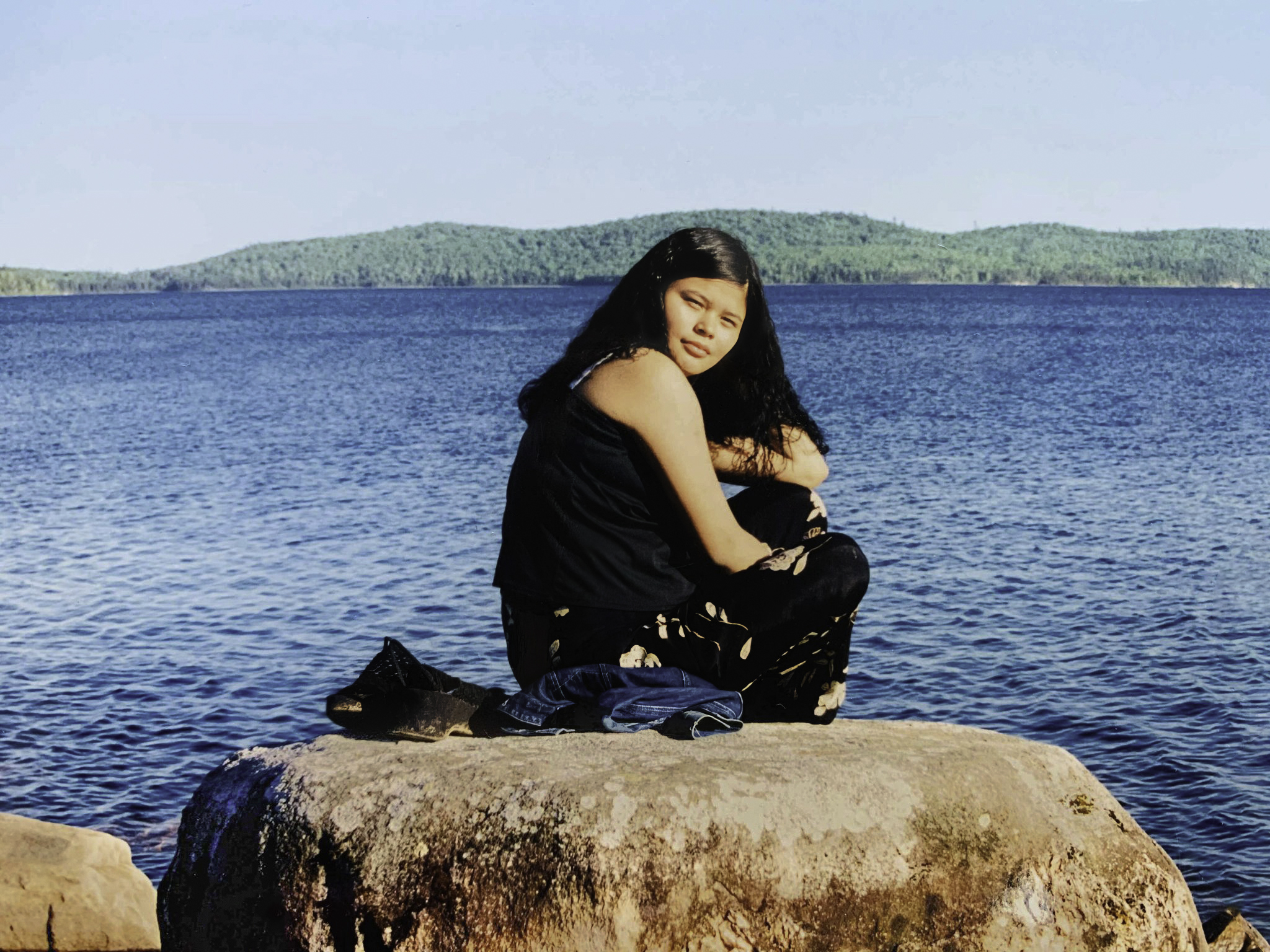
Joyce Echaquan, by the lake, in 1999

In 2020, a video recorded by the victim herself showed hospital staff in the city of Joliette in Quebec mocking and making sexist comments towards Joyce Echaquan, an indigenous Atikamekw woman who later died. Indigenous leaders described the video as exposing the grim realities of systemic racism that have long been ignored or suppressed across Canada.

Joyce Echaquan was admitted to La Joliette Hospital on 27 September 2020, complaining of severe abdominal pain. Three days later, from her hospital bed, she recorded a video where she can be heard crying out for help amid screams of pain. In the recording, the voices of two hospital employees can be heard insulting Echaquan, calling her "stupid" and suggesting she'd "be better off dead". Echaquan died shortly after ending the recording.

The video went viral and triggered a demonstration that gathered thousands in the provincial capital of Quebec. Protesters demanded "Justice for Joyce" and denounced the existing racism in the healthcare system. François Legault, Quebec's Premier, acknowledged that although he doesn't believe systemic racism exists in Canada like in the U.S., the case represents a racism issue that needs to be addressed.

=== Recognition of Systemic Racism ===
On 16 March, a petition addressed to the Quebec government was presented in the Blue Hall of the provincial legislature by the chairwoman of the Indigenous Women of Quebec, Marjolaine Étienne. Alongside her were the leader of the Assembly of First Nations of Quebec and Labrador, Ghislain Picard, and the community chief of the Atikamekw of Manawan, Sipi Flamand. The co-spokesperson of the Quebec Solidarity party, Manon Massé, officially presented the document acknowledging systemic racism and discrimination against Indigenous peoples, especially women and girls.

This principle, inspired by the tragic death of Joyce Echaquan at Joliette Hospital in 2020 due to racist treatment, advocates for ensuring equal access for Indigenous people to health and social services, while simultaneously recognizing the traditional and current knowledge of the Indigenous community. With over 4,000 signatures, the petition has garnered significant support. Sipi Flamand emphasized the importance of recognizing and addressing these issues to improve societal conditions. Despite increasing pressure, especially following the report on Echaquan's death, Prime Minister Legault has denied the existence of systemic racism in Quebec.

==== Response ====
With over 4,000 signatories and significantly greater support than expected, according to Marjolaine Étienne, the petition represents a powerful call to action. In the words of Sipi Flamand, recognizing these issues is essential for improving social conditions. Despite previous efforts to gain governmental recognition of systemic racism, Prime Minister Legault has consistently denied its existence in Quebec. However, following Judge Gehane Kamel's report on Echaquan's death, Indigenous organizations have increased pressure on the government. Prime Minister Legault and some members of his cabinet have expressed skepticism about the prevalence of systemic racism in Quebec. They've argued that the terminology can be divisive and that acknowledging systemic racism could be perceived as an attack on the Québécois identity.

=== Oblate Missionaries of Mary Immaculate in Quebec ===
In November 2023, the Superior Court of Quebec, overseen by Judge Thomas M. Davis, approved a class-action lawsuit against the Oblate Missionaries of Mary Immaculate. This legal action, initiated in March 2018, demands that the Catholic congregation acknowledge and redress the sexual assaults committed by several of its members on Indigenous children between 1940 and 2018.

The religious congregation, founded in France in 1816, has been present in Canada since 1841. The class-action lawsuit includes 203 individuals from the Innu, Atikamekw, and Anishinaabe peoples, who were abuse victims in the North Coast region of Quebec. 39 members of the Oblates have been identified as aggressors.

Noëlla Mark, a resident of the Unamen Shipu community, leads this class-action lawsuit. According to court documents, Mark claims to have been a repeated victim of Sexual Abuse by Alexis Joveneau, a prominent authority of the Oblates in the region for years. In total, another 68 individuals have identified Joveneau as their aggressor. Joveneau, originally from Belgium, lived in Canada from 1953 until his death in 1992. Magalie Lapointe and David Prince released a book in 2019 titled "The Devil of the North Coast," documenting testimonies of Joveneau's victims and revealing other abuses committed by the priest, including forced relocations and labor exploitation.

=== Forced sterilizations ===
In the 20th century, the eugenics movement grew in Canada, using forced sterilization as a method to control Indigenous populations, alongside the Indian Act of 1876. Non-Indigenous doctors worked in the health system set up for the native population and were encouraged to carry out sterilizations as a form of family planning. From the 1960s to the 1980s, the Aboriginal birth rate dropped from 47% to 28%, and sterilization laws began to be repealed by the late 1970s. However, Indigenous women have reported cases of coerced sterilization as late as 2018. Attorney Alisa Lombard has led several lawsuits on behalf of these Indigenous women with the support of the International Justice Resource Center (IJRC). The IJRC has pointed out that the extent of sterilization in modern times is unknown due to a lack of extensive research. After being publicly questioned by the UN about its involvement, the Canadian government committed to sharing any documentation of these events in its possession.

In Quebec, a judge has approved a class-action lawsuit by women of the First Nation Atikamekw against three doctors accused of performing sterilizations without their consent. This lawsuit underscores a broader concern about the treatment and systematic discrimination towards Indigenous women in Canada.

Background: The class-action lawsuit was filed by two Atikamekw women representing all women from their community who claim to have been sterilized without their knowledge or consent. Statements indicate that at least one of the women underwent the procedure without prior notice, while another succumbed to pressure from a physician. Given the seriousness of the allegations, the names of the women and the doctors were not disclosed in the judgment.

The women involved in the lawsuit maintain that these forced sterilizations not only violated their rights but were also carried out within a framework of racial and systematic discrimination. The affected view these acts as a form of racism that had a profound impact on their lives and those of their loved ones. They are seeking compensation for the suffering caused, though the exact amount has not yet been specified.

While the lawsuit originally also targeted the health board overseeing the hospital where the sterilizations occurred, Judge Lukasz Granosik only authorized legal actions against the three directly involved doctors, one of whom died in 2019.

An academic study conducted in the past year revealed that, since 1980, at least 22 Indigenous and Inuit women in Quebec were sterilized without their consent. It's important to note that the allegations presented in this class-action lawsuit have not yet been proven in court.

== Religious intolerance ==
=== Islamophobia and Quebec mosque attack ===
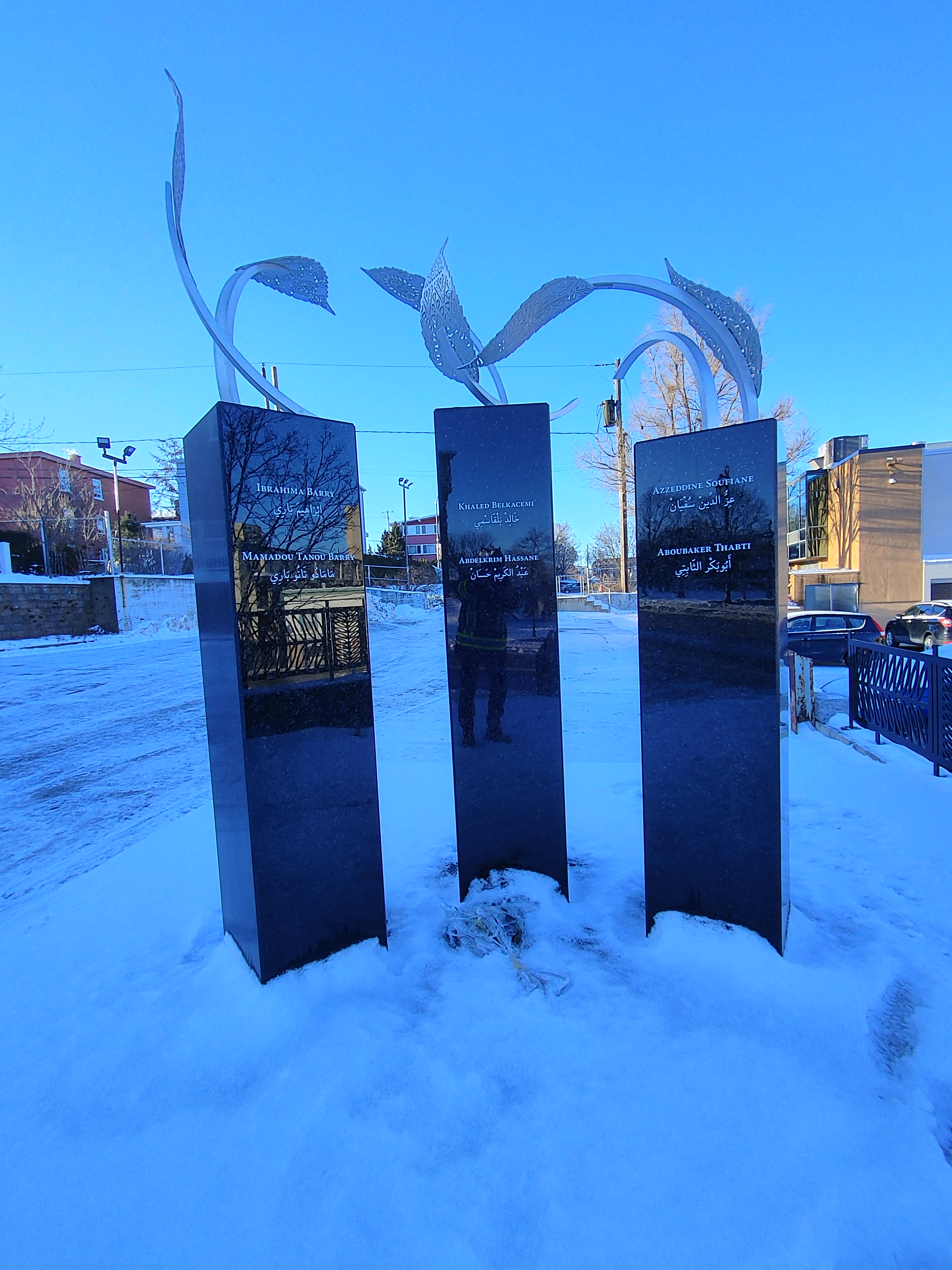
Tribute to the victims of the 2017 Quebec City shooting

The number of hate crimes reported by the police against Muslims in Quebec more than tripled between 2012 and 2015, even though, contradictorily, the total number of such crimes decreased during the same period, according to data from Statistics Canada. Statistics Canada has commented that "a rise in numbers might be linked to increased reporting".

In 2015, police nationwide recorded 159 hate crimes against Muslims, up from 45 in 2012, an increase of 253%.

Islamophobia has manifested as mosque vandalism, murders, and physical assaults on Muslims, including violence against Muslim women who wear the hijab or niqab. In January 2017, six Muslims were killed in a shooting at a mosque in Quebec City. The number of Islamophobic incidents has risen significantly over the past two years. Canadian media have played a mixed role in their coverage of Islamophobia and are said to have downplayed the crimes in their role of informing the Canadian audience. Canada's public education system has also been scrutinized for its role as a stage for multiple Islamophobic incidents against children, as well as the positive spread of Islamophobic attitudes among the youth.

=== Bill 62: prohibition of the niqab in public services ===
Following the Charter of Quebec Values in 2013, several Muslim women were attacked. On 17 September, a 17-year-old Muslim girl was attacked in St. Catharines, with punches to her face leaving her bloodied. In November, a woman wearing a hijab in Montreal was assaulted by two men; one spat on her while the other removed her veil.

In October 2017, the National Assembly of Quebec passed Bill 62, which stipulates that individuals cannot receive public services with their faces covered. The bill effectively bans the use of the niqab and burqa in public spaces, which has sparked controversy and debates about religious freedom and the secularism of Quebec society.

In September 2015, a pregnant woman wearing a hijab was attacked by teenagers in Toronto as they attempted to remove her veil. The assault caused her to fall and subsequently miscarry. In response to this, the National Assembly of Quebec unanimously passed a resolution against Islamophobia.

In January 2017, an armed man opened fire on worshippers at the Islamic Cultural Centre in Quebec, killing 6 and injuring another 19. Media reports indicated the attacker was a white university student with nationalist and anti-Muslim leanings. Many, both Muslim and non-Muslim, attributed the attack to the rise of Islamophobic rhetoric in Canada.

Statistics suggest that Islamophobia and racial attacks against these groups are particularly prevalent in Quebec. A survey by Angus Reid in 2009 found that 68% of the Quebec respondents had an unfavorable view of Islam. This had risen slightly to 69% by 2013. However, the same survey showed that the increase in Islamophobic attitudes across the rest of Canada was greater than in Quebec, rising from 46% in 2009 to 54% in 2013.

The implications of Bill 62 not only impacted residents of Quebec as a whole but also painted a contradictory picture of Canada. Often seen as a "multicultural" nation, the enactment of Bill 62 left Canadians questioning this term. A Canadian citizen remarked, "Just as every woman has the right to unveil, a woman beside her has the right to cover up... If the government is going to infringe on our basic rights, I don't want to be part of it."

=== Bill 21: ban on religious symbols ===
Bill 21 is a provincial law in Quebec, Canada, passed in June 2019, which prohibits certain public sector employees from wearing religious symbols, such as the hijab, yarmulkes, and Sikh turbans, while performing their duties. The legislation has become a significant point of debate in Quebec, with many seeing it as an infringement on religious freedom, while others view it as a measure to uphold secularism (laïcité) in the province. In a ruling issued in April 2021, the Quebec Superior Court determined that parts of Bill 21 violate Canada's constitution, specifically the Canadian Charter of Rights and Freedoms. The legislation was found to breach Section 23, which guarantees educational rights for minorities, and Section 3, which outlines the right to serve in the provincial legislature. Despite this ruling, most of the law remains in effect, barring public sector employees in authoritative roles, such as teachers and state prosecutors, from displaying religious symbols at work.

Several actors and organizations have condemned the law, suggesting it has an Islamophobic undertone, even though wearing the veil is not a direct mandate of the Quran, and wearing the niqab or burqa is even less so. The Ontario Ministry of Education funded a video that associates this law with "Islamophobic" acts, produced by the Muslim Association of Canada. The ruling has elicited a range of responses. Khalid Elgazzar, vice president of the board of the National Council of Canadian Muslims (NCCM), emphasized the "fundamental problems" with the law. Similarly, Noa Mendelsohn Aviv, from the Canadian Civil Liberties Association, highlighted concerns over rights violations with the continuation of this law. The ruling has had direct implications for English-speaking schools in Quebec, which are now exempt from the ban. The English Montreal School Board (EMSB), the largest in Quebec, celebrated the decision. However, the Quebec government has expressed its intention to appeal the ruling.

== Anti-Black racism ==
=== Slavery ===
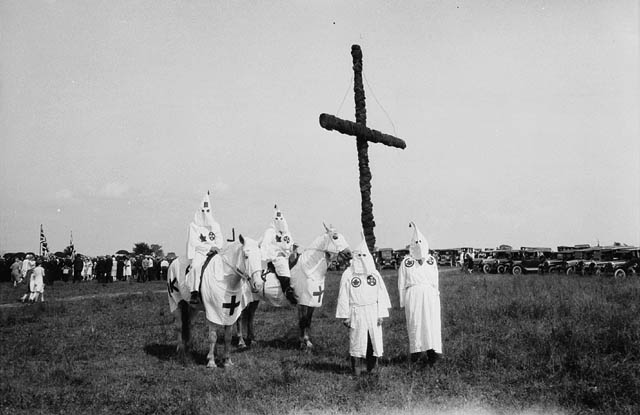
Members of the Ku Klux Klan in Canada, erecting a cross in 1927

The colony of New France was founded in the early 17th century and represents the first significant European colonial settlement in what is now Canada. Slavery was a common practice in the territory. Slavery in Quebec is a lesser-known facet of this Canadian province's history. While most people in Quebec are unfamiliar with this history, records indicate that between 1629 and 1833, there were 4,185 slaves in the territory. Quebec City, in particular, stood out as the main center of this activity, where many slaves served wealthy and prestigious families. Unlike other colonies in America, where slavery was intrinsically tied to the agrarian economy (such as tobacco, cotton, and sugar cane plantations), in Quebec, slave ownership was more a symbol of social status than an economic necessity. It's noted that Black slaves were valued significantly more than native slaves due to their perceived rarity and robustness.

From the beginnings of New France until its conquest by the British between 1758 and 1760, records indicate that approximately 3,600 enslaved individuals lived there. Most of these slaves were indigenous, often referred to as "Panis". However, Black slaves were also present, a result of the transatlantic slave trade. In 1689, King Louis XIV authorized the importation of Black slaves to New France at the request of the colonial government. Twenty years later, in 1709, New France enacted laws explicitly legalizing slavery, defining slaves as property and thus without rights. While various regulations were established to regulate slavery in the French colonies, the set of rules known as the "Code Noir" particularly stood out. Although it's unclear if the Code Noir was formally applied in New France, it strongly influenced the customs and practices of slavery in the colony.

The Code Noir provided some minimal protections for enslaved individuals, such as the obligation for owners to provide them with food, shelter, and clothing. However, this same code also granted slave owners the power to inflict violent punishments, including branding with hot iron, mutilating, and even killing them. Even with the harsh living conditions, there were free Black individuals in New France. However, they lived under the constant risk of being enslaved. An example of this occurred in 1732 when Governor Jonquierre enslaved a free Black man who had arrived from New England, justifying it on the premise that "a Black man is a slave, wherever he is".

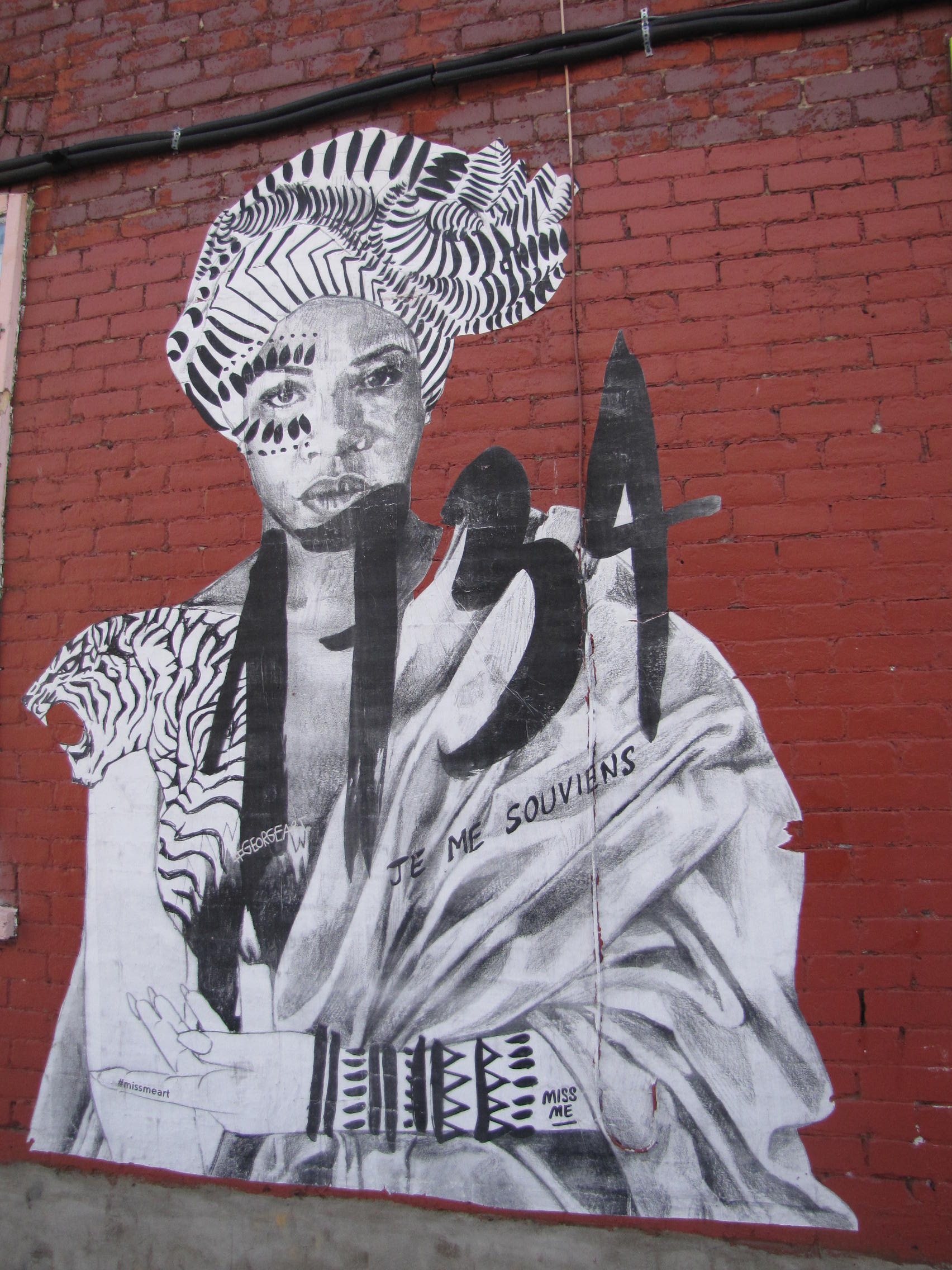
The descendants of Black slaves from New France and Lower Canada are French-speaking Canadians who appear white (known as "white-passing"). Their surnames include Carbonneau, Charest, Johnson, Lafleur, Lemire, Lepage, Marois, Paradis, etc.

A prominent figure in this context is Olivier Lejeune, who is recognized as the first Black man in Quebec. Enslaved from the age of 8, Lejeune was educated at the Jesuit residence in Seigneurie Notre-Dame-des-Anges in present-day Limoilou. Born in Madagascar, his name was given by Paul Le Jeune, the Jesuit who baptized him. This practice of renaming slaves was common, symbolizing a loss of identity and connection to their African history and culture. Despite the official abolition of slavery in the British Empire in 1833, there remains a delayed and limited acknowledgment of this history in Québécois culture. Individuals like Ndiaye have worked to shed light on this dark part of Quebec's history, aiming to educate the public through mediums like music and historical tours. His initiative "Qc. History X" is an effort to unveil these "unknown" aspects of Québécois history.

=== Health System ===
Eding Mvilongo boasts a 12-year tenure in the anesthesiology field, but for a majority of that period—over a decade—she did not work alongside any Black peers. This observation echoes findings in a recent report submitted to the UN, shedding light on anti-Black racism in Quebec. This investigative document is a segment of Canada's universal periodic review, a process that scrutinizes a nation's adherence to human rights standards.

Mvilongo, serving in healthcare establishments in Laval, observes a conspicuous scarcity of Black professionals occupying leadership roles. This evident disparity can seed skepticism towards the healthcare system. "Academic courses and online seminars may impart knowledge, but genuine comprehension stems from firsthand experiences of such realities," she commented.

In 2020, the findings by Canada's Public Health Agency underscored the evolving consensus which posits that "racism is an influential factor driving unequal health outcomes among racialized Canadians." The dearth or outright absence of Black leaders in vital roles stands as a testament to this, as evident at both institutional and societal strata.

A recent research undertaking, orchestrated in partnership with the human rights advocacy clinic at UQAM (University of Quebec in Montreal), suggests that a crux of the issue is Quebec's hesitance to acknowledge the presence of systemic racism. Researcher Ricardo Lamour posited, "The reluctance to admit the problem inherently stymies the generation of viable solutions."

This investigative report enumerates 31 advisory steps spanning healthcare, security, and migration domains. In the context of Black immigrants, the study unveiled disconcerting insights: "Officials within the Canadian immigration framework have voiced apprehensions over the prevalence of ingrained racist notions and stereotypes, painting individuals as 'dishonest or unreliable'." These functionaries emphasize that such entrenched biases can "influence case evaluations". Lamour highlighted, "Such preconceived notions can taint the entire immigration evaluation process for an individual."

Moreover, it was highlighted that these stereotypes can also affect those seeking student visas. Immigration activist Rivka Augenfeld pointed out that the algorithms deciding who gets a visa are biased. "There ends up being discrimination built into the program, so it's not even a person deciding that someone from Africa should be denied a student visa," she said.

Augenfeld, Lamour, and others hope that Quebec's situation will be a central topic in the review of Canada's human rights in November.

=== Sir George Williams Affair ===
In May 1968, six West Indian and Haitian students of Sir George Williams University accused biology professor Perry Anderson of discrimination because of alleged unfair grading. No meetings were held to discuss the incident and to find a solution. Eight months later, students took matters into their own hands by organizing meetings, sit-ins and peaceful protests. The events led to the Sir George Williams affair, the largest student occupation in Canadian history.

=== Death of Anthony Griffin ===
Around 6:30 am, a taxi driver calls the Montreal Urban Community Police Service because his passenger, Anthony Griffin, a 19-year-old Black Anglophone of Jamaican descent, originally from Sainte-Dorothée, didn't pay the $27 fare. Officers Allan Gosset and Kimberley Campbell were dispatched to the scene. After a computer check, Allan Gosset discovers that Anthony Griffin has a warrant for his arrest due to breaking and entering. The officers detain him, search him, and take him to police station 15, without handcuffing him. In the station parking lot, Allan Gosset opens the car door, and Anthony Griffin runs. Allan Gosset orders him to stop. Anthony Griffin halts six or seven meters from the officer. Allan Gosset orders Anthony Griffin to turn around. When he does, Allan Gosset shoots him on the right side of his forehead, killing him.

Roland Bourget, director of the Urban Community of Montreal Police Service, immediately suspended Allan Gosset, 38 years old with 16 years of service. A jury cleared Allan Gosset on 11 May 1988. This decision sparked a series of protests against police brutality and racism. The black community in Montreal was deeply affected by this event.

=== 1982–1984: Discrimination in the Montreal Taxi industry ===
Two waves of Haitian immigration marked the history of Quebec. The first, between 1968 and 1972, mainly brought professionals and academics fleeing the Duvalier dictatorship. Their training and skills matched Québec's needs in areas like education and health. The second wave, from 1973 to 1980, was different. It brought workers and laborers, more rural and less educated. Many of them found employment in factories or the taxi industry, facing challenging working conditions and low wages. This situation made them more susceptible to discrimination and racism, and the 80s economic crisis only exacerbated their problems.

Starting in 1974, Haitian drivers began working in Montreal's taxi industry. Despite the long hours and minimum wage, their number grew from 300 to 800 between 1978 and 1982. The 80s recession decreased the value of taxi licenses and owners' income, increasing racial tensions in the industry. In 1982, La Presse highlighted how the economic crisis was intensifying racial tensions in the taxi sector.

==== Protests and solidarity ====
On 16 July 1982, the Commission on Human Rights (CDPQ, in French) independently decided to conduct a public and general investigation into the taxi industry in Montreal due to numerous accusations of racial discrimination involving various sector players. This decision was influenced, among other factors, by profound repercussions in the English-speaking Caribbean and the expulsion of some students from Canada.

In June and July 1983, Montreal streets were filled with protestors, most of them taxi drivers of Haitian origin, expressing their discontent. They held banners in front of the courthouse with messages addressing governments and the community, such as "Hello! Ottawa Québec Montreal. Assume your responsibilities" and "Want to be strong and free in Quebec". The main reason for the protests was to denounce racism and discrimination in Montreal's taxi industry, amidst an economic crisis that also affected the taxi sector.

The final report, presented in the fall of 1984, addressed conclusions about direct individual and systemic discrimination and proposed recommendations to address these issues. It also provided a detailed analysis of the legislative, regulatory, and administrative framework governing Montreal's taxi industry and examined the operations of related governmental entities, proposing legislative and regulatory solutions.

The investigation revealed that racism in this industry was used as an unfair competitive tool and that, in this context, it indicated structural problems affecting the industry long before the significant arrival of black drivers, mostly of Haitian origin. This racism, intensified by skin colour, was just one aspect of a more significant problem. As a result of the investigation, significant government measures were adopted, leading to a noticeable improvement in the taxi industry. Among the highlighted actions was a government taxi license buyback plan. Thanks to these measures, the situation of all sector workers improved, not only the black drivers'. This investigation underscored the importance of addressing and combating racism in all areas and the need for regulation and government action to ensure fairness and justice.

=== 2017 Quebec National Day Parade ===
The 2017 Quebec National Day parade sparked significant controversy in the media and on social networks due to a performance many viewers perceived as racist. During the event, a video, which quickly went viral, showed a float being pulled by black teenagers while a group of white women danced around them. The Quebec National Day is an annual event celebrating diversity and integration in Quebec's multicultural society. However, this particular parade drew negative attention, mainly because of the contrasting images that some interpreted as reminiscent of historically oppressive times.

The controversy began when Félix Brouillet, a Canadian citizen, uploaded the video to Facebook with the comment: "I doubt the parade organizers understood the concept of diversity" ("I'm not sure the parade organizers grasped the concept of diversity"). In less than 24 hours, the video had been viewed by over a million people, triggering numerous online criticisms and debates under the hashtag #villeneuvegate. The event's organization responded to the criticisms, describing them as "disproportionate". Maxime Laporte, the committee's president, in an interview with Radio-Canada, defended the parade's diversity and called for calm. She explained, "We have people from all backgrounds: from Asia, Africa, everywhere in the world, who are now from Quebec and participated in the parade." She also mentioned that the incident was merely "a coincidence".

For his part, Sterve Lubin, the coach of the teenagers who were pulling the float and who belong to the Louis-Joseph-Papineau institute, downplayed the situation in an interview with CBC News. Lubin stated: "It was a pleasure for us to participate. It's a shame that people focus more on colour than on the participants." The incident highlighted the tensions and issues surrounding racial and cultural representation in public events. As a result of the controversy, event organizations in Quebec and elsewhere in Canada were called upon to be more aware and considerate regarding diversity and cultural representation in their activities.

=== 2023 – Joint Submission to Canada’s Fourth Universal Periodic Review ===
In 2023, the Immigrant Workers Centre (IWC-CTI), the Clinique Internationale de Défense des Droits Humains de l’UQAM (CIDDHU), spearheaded by key contributors Ricardo Lamour, Stéphanie Germain, and Rito Joseph, submitted a joint report to Canada's Fourth Universal Periodic Review (UPR). This report, titled "Anti-Black Racism in Quebec: Discrimination Experienced by Black People in the Health, Immigration, Judicial and Prison Sectors", provides a detailed examination of systemic racism and its impacts on Afro-descendant communities in Quebec. The submission highlights disparities in representation, discriminatory practices, and the persistent barriers faced by Black individuals in accessing justice, equitable health care, and fair treatment in immigration processes.

Key findings in the report include:

Health Sector Disparities: Black communities in Quebec are overrepresented in frontline healthcare jobs yet underrepresented in administrative and medical professional roles. They experience heightened exposure to systemic racism, poor working conditions, and inadequate healthcare tailored to their needs. Black children face disproportionately high rates of intervention by child welfare systems, often resulting from culturally biased assessments. Furthermore, coerced or forced sterilization of Afro-descendant women remains an underreported issue

Immigration Discrimination: Afro-descendant asylum seekers and immigrants face significant barriers, including disproportionate rates of detention and mistreatment by immigration authorities. The report critiques discriminatory visa processing practices and the closing of safe migration routes like Roxham Road, which impacts Afro-descendant migrants disproportionately

Judicial Sector: Black persons are subject to racial profiling, higher rates of arrest, and discriminatory treatment within the justice system. Recent court decisions, such as the Quebec Superior Court's declaration of random traffic stops as unconstitutional in the Luamba case, highlight entrenched practices of systemic racism. Despite these findings, resistance to reform remains evident, including Quebec's appeal of the Luamba decision

=== 2024 Longueuil Assault ===
On 2 October 2024, Stéphanie Borel, a white woman in Longueuil, a suburb in Montréal, committed an act of racially motivated pre-meditated assault, after allegedly throwing boiling water at a 10-year-old Black boy who took a shortcut that passed by the woman's home. The father explained that after his son was first hit with the boiling water, he fell to the ground. That was when, according to the boy, the woman poured the rest of the pot of water on him. When confronted by the father, Borel stated that the child had a habit of knocking at her door for the past three years, but the family had only lived in the neighbourhood for a few months, and the boy only started attending the school near the Borel's home a month prior.

== Anti-Hispanic and anti-Latino racism ==
=== Agricultural laborers ===
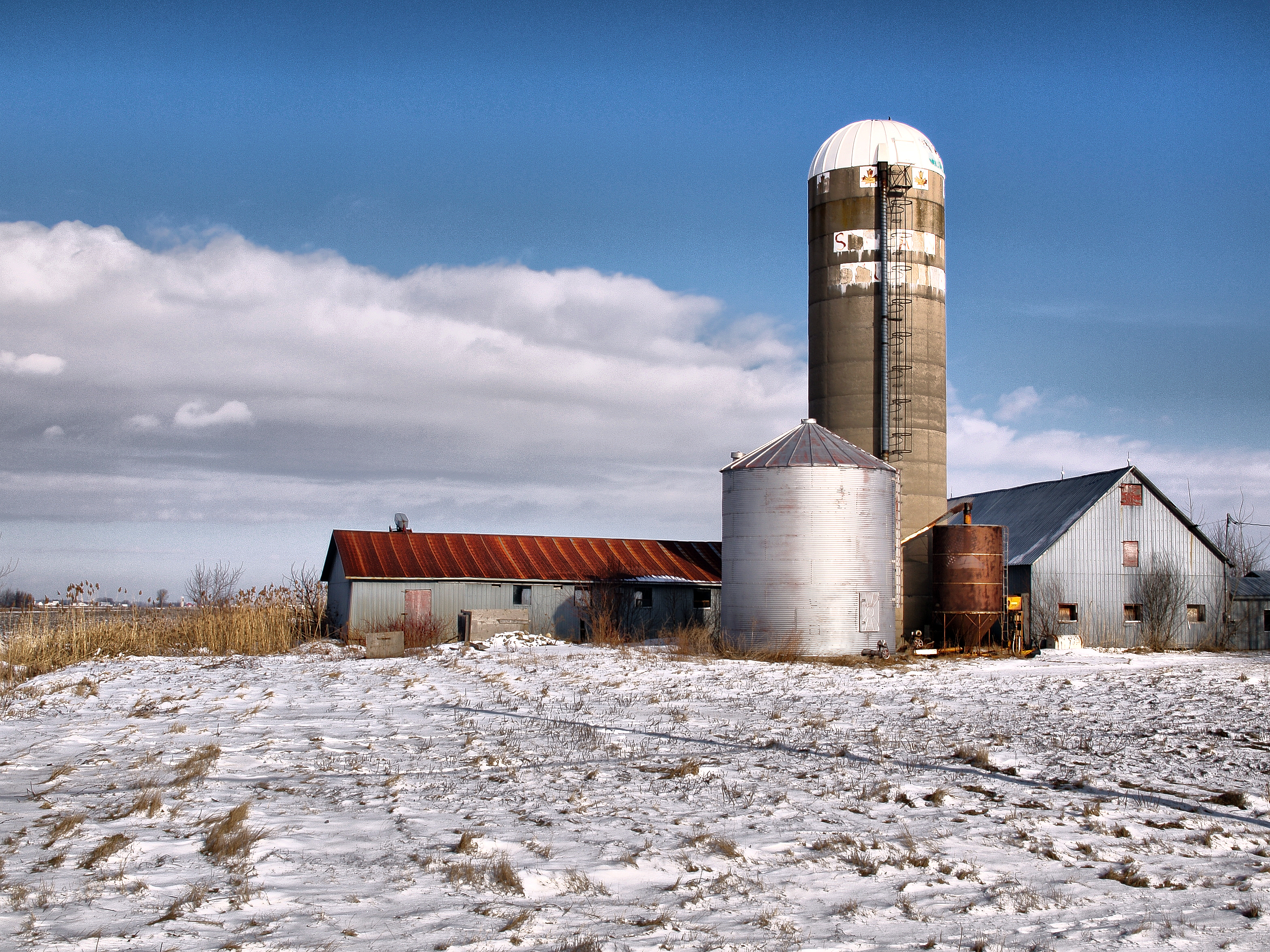
Farm in Saint-Damase, Montérégie (Québec)

The portrayal of agricultural laborers in Quebec society has evolved in various ways over time, many of which are imbued with preconceptions and stereotypes that do not do justice to the reality and complexity of these workers. Since the arrival of temporary workers, especially of Latin American origin, to Quebec, discriminatory and rejecting attitudes were observed from some sectors of the population, often based on racial and cultural prejudices. These attitudes manifested in various ways, from derogatory comments in daily life to labor and policy decisions that marginalized these workers. Yet, at the same time, the need for these laborers in the agricultural industry was undeniable, as their hard work enabled the Quebec agro-industry to flourish.

Initially, agriculture was the foundational pillar of the economy in Saint-Rémi. Although manufacturing has gained ground in recent times, agriculture remains essential to the identity and social organization of the area. During the 1980s, the practice of hiring laborers of different ethnic origins, particularly non-Quebecers, to work on farms during the summer began. The temporary nature of these jobs and the short stay of these workers did not cause major conflicts at that time. However, with the arrival of Mexican workers under programs like PTAT and TFWP, their duration of stay began to extend, increasing their visibility in the community.

In Saint-Rémi, the duality of these portrayals is evident. On one hand, the laborers are seen as indispensable, efficient, and willing to perform tasks that many Quebecers are not interested in doing; on the other hand, their identity and culture are often reduced to simplistic stereotypes, and they are treated as "others," outsiders to the community. This "needed but not belonging" situation has perpetuated a cycle of structural racism where, although the workers are essential to the economy, their humanity and rights are constantly threatened and not fully recognized. Furthermore, the economic portrayal often given to these workers overlooks their living and working conditions, family separations, linguistic and cultural barriers, and challenges in integrating into a society that often sees them as temporary, despite their long-term contribution.

The growing visibility of migrants in the community has led some local residents to use terms like "invasion" or "occupation," especially in relation to the use of public spaces such as supermarkets and banking services. These perceptions are rooted in a feeling of otherness, as migrants are viewed as "outsiders" or "foreigners" due to cultural, linguistic, and ethnic differences. Additionally, there's a widespread belief among some locals that these migrants "steal" jobs, even though they were brought by large farmers to fill vacancies that were not being filled by local residents.

=== Exploitation of foreign workers by Newrest and Trésor ===
In October 2023, a legal controversy emerged in Quebec related to the exploitation of foreign workers. A proposed class-action lawsuit claimed that Newrest, an international airline food supplier, and Trésor, a recruitment firm based in Laval, had deceived foreign workers, luring them to Canada with false employment promises. According to the Montreal Immigrant Workers Center, which sought authorization to file the lawsuit, over 400 individuals were falsely promised work permits and legal jobs in Canada since 2021. Instead, they were urged to work illegally. The lawsuit suggests these workers were treated degradingly, subject to control, disposability, and exploitation.

The charge alleges that Trésor recruited workers mainly from Spanish-speaking countries, suggesting to some they travel to Canada as visitors and work during a "trial period" without a valid work permit. Most of these workers are said to have never received such permits. Many of the recruited workers were found in Newrest's production facilities, preparing food for flights from Montreal-Trudeau International Airport.

Benoît Scowen, from the Immigrant Workers Center, highlighted the vulnerability and violation of these workers' human rights. Quebec's Minister of Labor, Jean Boulet, expressed concern and noted that if the allegations were true, they would be unacceptable. Meanwhile, Guillermo Montiel, president of Trésor, expressed his surprise at the allegations. Newrest assured that they complied with both Canadian and Quebec laws and committed to investigating the claims. As of the last update, the lawsuit has yet to be approved by a judge. The goal is to obtain unspecified compensations from the involved companies. The situation highlights labor and immigration issues in the Canadian context, with a resolution expected in the coming months.

=== Consultation on Latino discrimination and racism ===
The Consultation on systemic discrimination and racism in Quebec was an initiative proposed by the Quebec Liberal Party in 2017. This effort, largely driven by the party's youth wing, sought to address and assess the situation of discrimination and racism in the French-speaking province of Canada. Quebec has faced challenges in adequately representing its demographic diversity in various public institutions. Available data at the time revealed significant gaps in representation in the National Assembly of Quebec, police bodies, and other provincial and municipal institutions.

The consultation proposal was not well received by all. Parties like the Parti Québécois (PQ) and the Coalition Avenir Québec (CAQ) showed their disagreement and called for the consultation's annulment. One of the arguments presented by these parties was that mentioning "systemic discrimination" and "racism" in the consultation's title could depict Quebec residents as racist, even though statistical data confirms systemic racism's existence in the region. Despite the controversy and political interventions, the consultation seemed to offer a chance to address and seek solutions to these issues. However, the Quebec Council of Ministers decided to withdraw the mandate to conduct the consultation from the Commission on Human Rights and Youth Rights (CDPDJ). As a result, the consultation's name was changed to "Forum on the appreciation of diversity and the fight against discrimination".

=== Montréal-Nord and racial profiling in 2008 ===
On 10 August 2008, two police officers from the province of Quebec identified a group of young people playing dice in a park's parking lot. Among them was Dany, brother of Fredy Villanueva. When the police tried to detain Dany, other youngsters intervened. As a result, one of the officers shot three of them, resulting in Fredy's death and injuries to the other two young men. This tragedy triggered riots in Montréal-Nord on the night of 10–11 August 2008. The news spread quickly, sparking unrest and calls for protests against what many considered systematic "police brutality". The tensions culminated in protests and clashes between neighborhood youth and the police. Peter George-Louis, lawyer for the Villanueva family, stated that statistics and racial profiling gave context to the August 2008 uprising and highlighted the need to address these issues to prevent future conflicts.

Montréal-Nord witnessed a significant surge in racial profiling in 2008, particularly towards the black community, whose effects profoundly impacted citizens and security forces' relations. The event serves as a reminder of the urgent need for understanding, dialogue, and change in the province's institutional structures and policing.

Dr. Charest, the author of the study, noted that most of this increase in stops occurred in the months leading up to the riots. Furthermore, he pointed out that in Montréal-Nord, racial profiling towards the black community had grown by 126% between 2001 and 2007. An update to the study, dated 30 August, revealed that in two out of three stops involving black individuals, the reasons were weak or vague, such as "routine investigation" or "person of interest," leading to perceptions of ethnic profiling and generating discontent.

==== Repercussions ====
The aftermath of this incident was not limited to the initial violence. Various demonstrations were organized demanding justice for Fredy and questioning police practices. In May 2009, a public inquiry was launched to investigate the circumstances of Villanueva's death. However, this investigation was interrupted in 2011 due to legal debates and resumed in 2013. Despite investigative efforts, the Montreal City Council and the Montreal Police Brotherhood were accused of obstructing the investigative process. On 17 December 2013, the resulting report was published with specific recommendations for the police and other entities. Despite these recommendations, Montréal-Nord remained marked by pain and anger, revealing the underlying tensions between the community and the police.

Brunilda Reyes, director of the food assistance organization Les Fourchettes de l’espoir, indicated that Villanueva's death reflected the latent discontent in the neighborhood, marked by shortages and a lack of opportunities. Inés Melara, a resident of the area, emphasized the persistent inequalities in Montreal-Nord and how, 15 years later, similar dynamics leading to the tragic event can still be observed.

=== Prejudice towards Brazilians ===
In the early 21st century, numerous Brazilians chose to settle in the province of Quebec, Canada. Most of these immigrants arrived in the region with a qualified immigrant status, hoping to use their skills and professional training for a better quality of life. However, during the initial years after their arrival, a significant group faced various challenges.

In 2007, an exploratory study based on testimonials from Brazilians living in Quebec since 2000 revealed that labor market insertion had not been homogeneous across different areas of specialization. While professionals in exact sciences found job opportunities more easily, those connected to the health sector, despite meeting all the legal requirements and procedures required by the Quebec Ministry of Education and Leisure for the validation of their studies, faced unemployment. Meanwhile, professionals in the humanities felt that they had been marginalized from the job market for which they had prepared in Brazil, expressing disappointment at not finding suitable job opportunities and wages in line with their expectations. Daily coexistence between Brazilians and Quebecers has triggered a complex process of mutual categorization. On one hand, some Quebecers display resistance towards Brazilians based on cultural prejudices, but at the same time, feel affinity due to the shared Latin heritage and history of their respective languages. However, some Brazilians, upon perceiving certain attitudes of rejection, develop a perception of Quebecers as provincial and subordinate to the English colonial legacy. This duality in perceptions and attitudes is magnified in Quebec's linguistic context, where the relationship between Brazilians and Francophones and Anglophones varies, oscillating between overcoming and retraction.

=== Kate Moya ===
Kate Moya is a Venezuelan-Québécois comedian who has gained notoriety on social media for her humorous videos and comments about life in Quebec. However, her digital journey has not been without problems, especially concerning racism. Born to Venezuelan parents who migrated to Quebec in 1992, Moya has lived almost her entire life in Canada. Although she grew up in a bilingual environment and considers herself Venezuelan and Latina, her French pronunciation reflects her life in Quebec. While most reactions to her videos are positive, her rising trajectory on social media has brought a series of negative and racist comments.

Moya has mentioned on several occasions that although she has felt accepted in Quebec for most of her life, it is through social media that she has faced racism directly. Negative comments often focus on her origin and accent, with some users urging her to "

go back to her country" or "stop speaking French" due to her accent. This reaction, Moya believes, reflects an inherent problem in Quebec society: the difficulty some individuals have in accepting multiculturalism and diversity.

In an interview with Radio-Canada, Moya expressed her determination to combat these stereotypes through humor, believing that laughter can be a tool for change. Through her content, she not only offers a humorous look at everyday life in Quebec but also seeks to create spaces for dialogue about the diversity that characterizes the province.

== Structural racism in the Québec immigration system ==
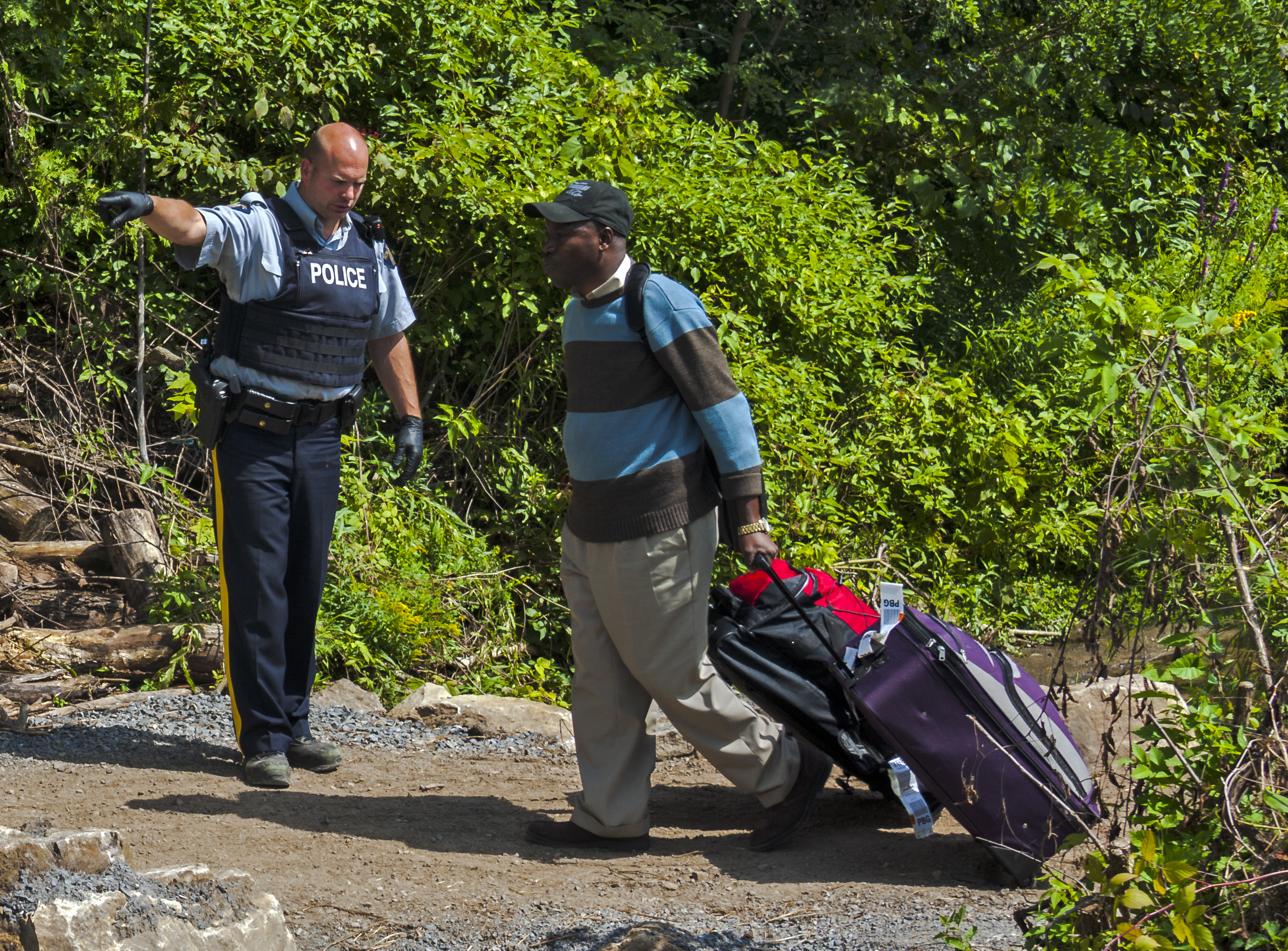
Asylum seeker entering Quebec via Champlain

Themrise Khan, an independent research professional, highlights the endemic racism in Canadian society. She argues that if left unaddressed, while simultaneously expanding economic immigration, it might discourage migrants from coming or staying in Canada. While there are clear indications from both the government and the Canadian public in favor of increasing immigration targets—with a goal of 1.5 million permanent residents from 2023 to 2025, up from the approximate one million from 2020 to 2022—and surveys showing an increasingly favorable public opinion towards immigration, challenges persist.

Khan points out that, though there are signs of a pro-immigrant attitude and the evident economic benefits of immigration (as a tool to address Canada's endemic labor shortages), the social implications of welcoming new immigrants are often underscored by racism and discrimination towards "visible minorities". Khan cites instances such as "heightened surveillance of certain immigrant populations, intense scrutiny of some of their financial resources, and discrimination against migrant workers". In addition to incidents of hate crimes against members of immigrant groups, Khan emphasizes that immigrants are viewed as "numeric targets" to be met within a set timeframe, a form of dialectic subjugation with real consequences in how newcomers are perceived by both immigrants and Canadians. Refugees and Citizenship Canada (IRCC) has addressed racism in the past and proposed stronger anti-racist measures in its recent plans. However, these are confined to its organizational strategy and do not tackle the endemic racism in society. The implementation of Bill 96 has led to regressive recommendations that represent a form of governmental discrimination towards immigrants.

Khan suggests substantial changes:

1. Alter the language surrounding immigration in Canada, viewing immigration as a human right and not a numbers game.
2. Do not view immigration solely from an economic perspective, recognizing that immigrants, like Canadians, are individuals with social realities.
3. Adopt an anti-racist philosophy in the services provided to immigrants.
4. Ensure that immigrants not only receive economic compensation but also social protection.

Canada offers various categories and programs for those wishing to enter, whether temporarily or permanently. Below is a table that summarizes the main entry categories:

Entry Type	Description
Temporary Entry	Millions of people from around the world come to Canada to visit, work, or study temporarily.
Economic Immigration	Includes programs such as: Express Entry, Provincial Nominee Program, Skilled Workers selected by Quebec, Start-up Visa Program, and Caregiver Program.
Family Reunification	Canadian citizens and permanent residents can sponsor their loved ones, including spouses, common-law partners, dependent children, parents, and grandparents.
Refugee Resettlement	Resettlement of refugees from abroad and an asylum system in Canada for individuals with a well-founded fear of persecution, torture, or death.
International Students	Over 400,000 students. After graduation, they can continue working in Canada and eventually apply for permanent immigration.
Temporary Workers	Includes programs like the Foreign Temporary Worker Program, International Mobility Program, and International Experience in Canada.
Irregular Entry	Irregular entries into Canada at a location other than a port of entry, which does not guarantee permanence in the country and can result in detention and deportation proceedings.
Source: Canadian Ministry of Citizenship and Immigration

=== Two-tiered system ===
The "two-tiered immigration system" refers to how the immigration policy proposals of Quebec province result in preferential treatment for economic immigrants (those selected based on their ability to contribute to the economy, such as skilled workers) over other categories, such as those seeking family reunification. Under such a system:

1. First Tier: Economic immigrants who would be admitted more quickly due to the perception that they fill an immediate labor gap or meet economic needs. These immigrants might have access to more resources, a faster application process, or more flexible rules.
2. Second Tier: Other immigrants, like those coming through family reunification programs or as refugees. These immigrants might face longer waiting times, fewer resources, or stricter criteria.

The use of the term "two-tiered immigration system" carries a negative connotation, suggesting it is unfair or discriminatory in granting preferential treatment to one group over another. The creation of such systems can lead to political and social tensions and is a topic of debate in many nations struggling to balance economic needs with humanitarian and familial considerations. In an effort to respond to labor demands, Legault announced shortly after his election that Quebec would accept about 12,000 fewer immigrants in 2019, representing a nearly 20% decrease compared to the previous liberal government's figures. More recently, he has asked the federal government for greater flexibility so that Quebec can increase the number of economic immigrants it accepts, leading to a proportional reduction in the admissions of other types of immigrants, especially those coming through family reunification and resettlement programs.

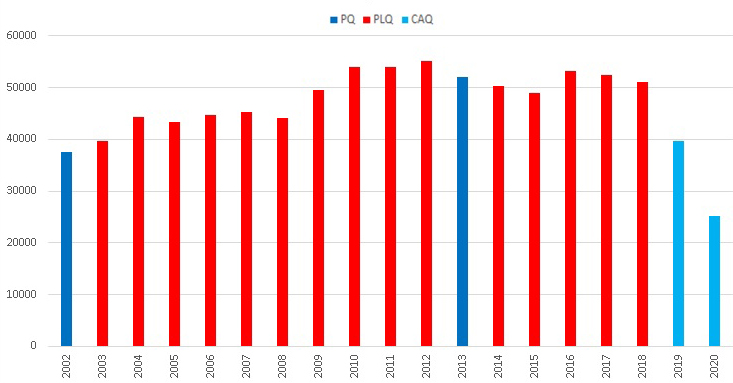
Number of immigrants received in Quebec by the governing party from 2002 to 2020

While this new approach would benefit businesses by providing them with needed talent, it is expected to lengthen waiting times for those seeking family reunification. Currently, the waiting time in Quebec to process a family reunification application is about 24 months. If the proportion of economic immigrants rises to 65%, this time increases to three years, according to federal sources. This has an unintended side effect, as skilled immigrants that Quebec chooses may opt to move to other provinces or territories in Canada instead of facing long periods of separation from their families.

=== Closed work permits ===
One of the most notable and controversial elements of this system is the implementation of closed work permits. These permits tie foreign workers to a specific employer. The Association in Defense of the Rights of Household and Agricultural Workers (DTMF) has pointed out that such permits can place workers in a vulnerable situation by limiting their ability to change employers. This vulnerability has been backed by observations from international bodies. For instance, the United Nations Special Rapporteur on Contemporary Forms of Slavery has expressed concerns about how these permits can expose workers to abuse without being able to report it for fear of reprisals, such as deportation.

Additionally, in the context of these policies, there has been a recorded increase in the number of temporary foreign workers in Quebec. This trend has fueled debates on whether the province seeks long-term integration of immigrants or is favoring a labor turnover dynamic. Large unions, such as the Confédération des syndicats nationaux (CSN) and the Fédération des travailleurs et travailleuses du Québec (FTQ), have supported initiatives seeking a review and reform of these permits. These organizations contend that, beyond formal rights, workers often face threats and fears that limit their ability to act in defense of their own interests.

=== Sponsorship program ===
A situation that has highlighted tensions in Canada's immigration systems and potential allegations of discrimination revolves around the experience of Laurianne Lachapelle. This Quebecer has been waiting for over a year for the arrival of her husband, originally from Guatemala, to Canada, through a sponsorship program. Due to prolonged waiting times, Laurianne found herself reconsidering her residency in Quebec and facing extremely difficult personal decisions, including abortion.

Lachapelle married a Guatemalan in January 2022. In August of the same year, she submitted an application as part of the program to sponsor a spouse or partner living abroad. Originally, the estimated waiting time was 13 months, but a year later, this period doubled, reaching at least 34 months.

According to data provided by the Journal de Montréal in July, approximately 37,000 sponsorship applications previously approved by Quebec were awaiting processing. This contrasts with an annual admission target of about 10,600 people.

"It's not just a matter of numbers, there are human beings behind and it's heartbreaking. There are moments in life that cannot be shared. There are mothers who cannot experience the childhood of their children and I find it unacceptable."

— Laurianne Lachapelle

Faced with the delay and uncertainty of her husband's arrival, and after becoming pregnant, Lachapelle made the painful decision to have an abortion. She explained: "It was not my choice because if my husband had had the chance to come to Quebec, our family would have started now. I couldn't imagine going through my pregnancy alone. It was something we wanted to experience together. I think about it every day and it hurts. It was a terrible choice I had to make".

==== Government reaction ====
Christine Fréchette, Minister of Immigration, Francization, and Integration, responded to concerns about immigration delays, highlighting that a parliamentary commission was underway on the issue. However, she avoided referring to individual cases and emphasized the importance of the data as a whole. The government's response was perceived by Lachapelle as lacking in humanity, suggesting a possible disconnect from the real issues faced by individuals.

=== Forced francization ===
Cultural insecurity has been a constant in the psyche of Canadian-French heritage francophones. This insecurity, according to Marco Micone in his article "The Anger of an Immigrant" published in Le Devoir on 3 March 2017, stems in part from the minority status of francophones in Canada and North America as a whole. This situation is exacerbated by the allure the English language holds for many immigrants. Throughout history, Quebecers have constructed a narrative in which the French language is "threatened," "besieged," and "ill." This narrative has been used both to mobilize the community and to raise awareness. The perception of French as a besieged language has galvanized actions and discourses in defense of the language and culture.

However, some interpret this cultural and linguistic insecurity as a sign of collective xenophobia. Directly linking the Quebecers' linguistic insecurity feeling with an "anti-immigrant discourse" is a bold step. Over the years, the fight to preserve the French language in Quebec has gone hand in hand with efforts to integrate immigrants into this culture.

Francization refers to the process of making something or someone French in terms of culture, language, identity, etc. It can refer both to the process of adapting something to French culture and to the assimilation of individuals or communities to French culture.

==== Bill 101: Strengthening French at the expense of minorities ====
Linguistic rights have been a controversial topic in the Canadian province of Quebec for decades. Over 40 years ago, in 1977, Bill 101, the Charter of the French Language in Quebec, was enacted by the Quebec government.

Bill 101 or the Charter of the French Language is a law enacted in 1977 in the province of Quebec, Canada, with the primary purpose of strengthening the use of French as the official and predominant language in the province. The law has been the subject of multiple debates and criticisms since its implementation due to its implications on the anglophone community and other linguistic minorities. Since the 1837 rebellion, francophones in Canada have held a position where English has been dominant in political and economic structures, especially in provinces like Ontario, New Brunswick, and Manitoba. The Act of Union of 1840 and the creation of the Confederation in 1867 raised concerns about the preservation of the French language and culture.

In the 1970s, the Quebec government believed that the survival and growth of the French language and culture required legislative intervention. Hence, Bill 101 came into existence. The law requires businesses in Quebec to operate in French, and all outdoor signage to be predominantly in French. Further, children of immigrants were required to attend French schools, unless their parents had been educated in English in Canada.

===== Implications =====
One of the most controversial components of Bill 101 is the restriction on English education. Under this law, immigrants and the majority of francophones must receive primary and secondary education in French. This provision has garnered criticism for its potential effects on anglophone communities and other linguistic minorities in Quebec. A subsequent analysis suggests that, although Bill 101 has succeeded in strengthening the use of French in the province, it has raised concerns about its impact on non-francophone communities, particularly in metropolitan areas such as Montreal.

Since the implementation of Bill 101, there has been a decline in the number of anglophone schools in Quebec and an exodus of English speakers to other provinces or the United States. Despite the predominant presence of francophones, Quebec has historically been diverse in terms of culture and language. The province has been home to communities such as Indigenous peoples, anglophones, Jews, Afro-Caribbeans, among others, who have significantly contributed in various areas.

The federal government of Canada has recently taken steps to strengthen the linguistic rights of francophones across Canada. However, these measures have raised concerns about whether the rights of anglophone communities and other minorities in Quebec are being equitably guaranteed.

==== Bill 96: Linguistic protection ====
The primary goal of this Quebec language law was to establish French as the official language of the province in everyday spaces such as government, schools, courts, businesses, among others, through various linguistic requirements. Nevertheless, the Quebec government approved legislation titled Bill 96, "Law on French, the official and common language of Quebec," which introduces new modifications to the existing legislation of the Charter.

Bill 96, a revision of the Charter of the French Language, was adopted in the National Assembly. This new legislation limits the use of English in courts and public services, also imposing stricter linguistic requirements on small businesses, municipalities, and CEGEP students. A particularly controversial clause demands newcomers learn French within six months of their arrival; otherwise, they lose access to most public services in any other language.

===== Reactions =====
In the wake of the recent adoption of Bill 96, which reforms the Charter of the French Language in Quebec, various groups aiding immigrants, migrant workers, and refugees in Montreal have expressed concern about its impact on the immigrant community. Community workers say the law makes it hard for immigrants to access justice and complete daily tasks, increasing their isolation and vulnerability. Additionally, there's a perception that Quebec is creating a two-tiered immigration system. This might discourage people fleeing conflicts and who only speak basic English from coming to the province, despite growing labor needs. At the same time, the province relies on a growing number of temporary foreign workers to fill significant labor gaps.

Evelyn Calugay, executive director of PINAY, a Filipino women's rights group, shared her personal experience regarding the challenge of learning French. She highlighted that many Filipinos arrive in Quebec to take on precarious jobs, leaving them little time to learn the language. She also referred to the linguistic history of the Philippines, emphasizing that English and Spanish were languages imposed throughout its history. Prime Minister François Legault expressed his interest in ensuring that a larger number of immigrants entering the province already speak French. He mentioned that his government has increased the selection proportion of French-speaking immigrants from 55% to 84%. However, the percentage of French-speaking immigrants accepted into the province by the federal government is only 50%.

Mostafa Henaway of the Migrant Workers' Centre also voiced concerns, suggesting the government seems to be prioritizing temporary migrant labor to appease its voter base. For her part, Rose Ndjel, director of Afrique au Féminin in Parc-Extension, emphasized how the law could affect those who have already been living there for years and might not have easy access to French courses. She pointed out that sometimes children miss school to help translate services for their parents or grandparents, and this situation worsens with the new law.

== Structural racism in Quebec's healthcare system ==
In 2023, the debate over systemic racism in Quebec's healthcare system intensified. Numerous healthcare professionals and Indigenous organizations criticized the stance of the provincial government, led by Premier François Legault, who denied the existence of systemic racism in the province. The issue gained traction following the case of Joyce Echaquan, an Indigenous woman who died in 2020 at Joliette hospital while being subjected to racist insults. Her death led to the proposal of the "Joyce Principle," a set of measures suggested by the Atikamekw Indigenous community to ensure equitable access to medical services.

The Quebec College of Physicians, headed by Dr. Mauril Gaudreault, questioned the government's "paternalistic and colonialist" approach in its new legislation aimed at enhancing care for the Indigenous population within the public health system. The college submitted a report to a legislative committee stating that it would be challenging to provide care that respects cultural identity without first acknowledging systemic racism in the healthcare system. Furthermore, they recommended expanding the bill to include other vulnerable groups and stressed the importance of involving Indigenous organizations in the drafting of the legislation. The Minister of Indigenous Affairs, Ian Lafrenière, defended the government's proposal, asserting he had met with various Indigenous groups prior to its introduction. However, he faced criticism over an alleged lack of proper consultation during its drafting.

Ghislain Picard, leader of the First Nations Assembly of Quebec-Labrador, chose not to attend the committee meetings, claiming that the legislative proposal disrespected the rights of First Nations. Meanwhile, Marjolaine Sioui, from the First Nations Social Services and Health Commission of Quebec and Labrador, emphasized that any policy on cultural safety must be developed in collaboration with the First Nations and Inuit groups.

== See also ==
- Islamophobia in Quebec
- Racism by country
- Racism in Canada
- Racism in North America
- Covert racism
- Environmental racism
- Index of racism-related articles
- Institutional racism
- Scientific racism
