= Relational Semantics, Inc. =

American software company

Relational Semantics, Inc. (RSI) is an American software company that specializes in case management systems for state courts and agencies. Founded in 1983, RSI is based in Boston, Massachusetts,

The Massachusetts Appellate Courts system and other court systems in New England, use RSI's Forecourt judicial case management system to automate case workflows and to provide web-based public access to case information.

== History ==
RSI was founded in 1983. Bob Gorman currently serves as RSI's president and lead software architect.

An early version of RSI's case management technology was adopted by the Vermont Judicial Bureau in 1990 to computerize workflows associated with traffic court cases.

RSI's Forecourt software was adopted by the Massachusetts Appellate Courts (comprising the Massachusetts Appeals Court and the Massachusetts Supreme Judicial Court) as a pilot program in the late 1990s and then implemented state-wide in 2001. Starting in 2003 the Appellate Courts used RSI technology to allow web-based public access to non-confidential case information in the Forecourt system. An updated version of the system and its web portal remain in use as of November 2015. In 2014 RSI updated the system to ingest electronically filed case documents from attorneys and litigants, such as briefs and motions.

Forecourt was adopted by the Connecticut Housing Court in 2002. The system remains in use as of November 2015.

== Products ==
RSI's Forecourt judicial case management system coordinates and automates workflows throughout the case lifecycle from case initiation, docketing, and calendaring, through to final disposition and reporting. RSI's extensions to the core Forecourt system support web publishing, role-sensitive mobile access, and integration with external systems including e-filing portals.

RSI also makes Paragon software which supports state agencies in managing various types of case work. The Vermont Division of Fire Safety uses Paragon to manage inspection and safety information for structures statewide.
