= Quebec City mosque shooting =

2017 mass shooting in Quebec, Canada

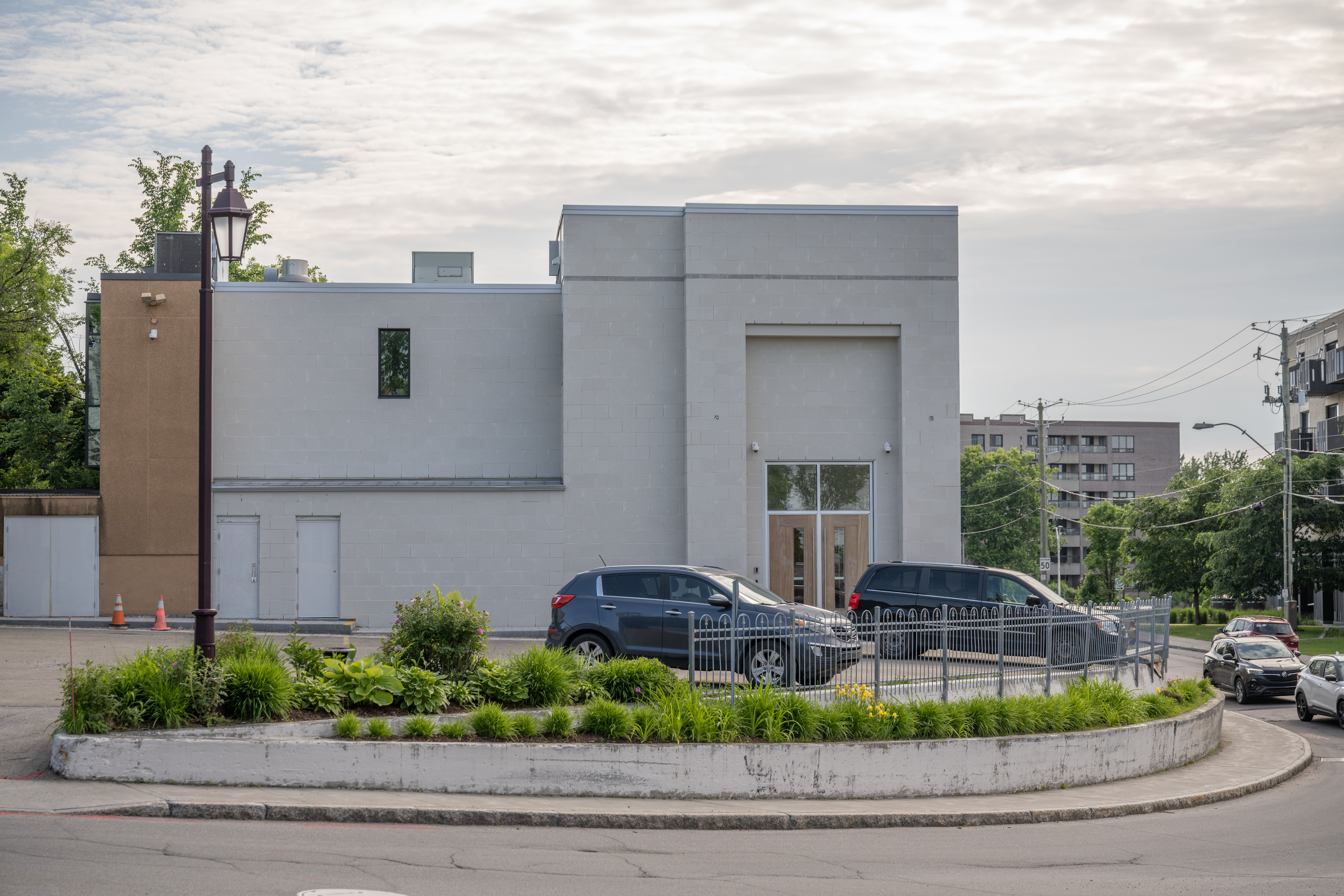
- Quebec Islamic Cultural Centre in June 2022

- Quebec City mosque shooting (Quebec City) Quebec City mosque shooting (Quebec) Quebec City mosque shooting (Canada)
- Location: 46°46′41″N 71°18′19″W; Sainte-Foy, Quebec City, Canada
- Date: January 29, 2017; 9 years ago 7:54 – 7:56 p.m. (EST)
- Target: Muslim worshippers at a mosque
- Attack type: Mass shooting, mass murder, domestic terrorism, hate crime
- Weapons: .223 Remington vz. 58 Sporter semi-automatic rifle (unused); 9mm Glock 17 Gen 5 semi-automatic pistol
- Deaths: 6
- Injuries: 19 (5 by gunfire)
- Perpetrator: Alexandre George-Henri Bissonnette
- Motive: Islamophobia, Far-Right extremism, Anti-immigration
- Verdict: Pleaded guilty
- Convictions: 6 counts of first-degree murder and 19 counts of attempted murder
- Sentence: Life imprisonment with the possibility of parole after 25 years

On the evening of January 29, 2017, an Islamophobic domestic terrorist attack took place at the Islamic Cultural Centre of Quebec City, a mosque in the Sainte-Foy neighbourhood of Quebec City, Canada. Six worshippers were killed and five others seriously injured after evening prayers when the gunman entered the prayer hall shortly before 8:00 pm and opened fire for about two minutes with a semi-automatic pistol. Approximately 40 people were reported present at the time of the shooting.

The French-Canadian shooter, 27-year-old Alexandre Bissonnette, pleaded guilty to six counts of first-degree murder and five counts of attempted murder. On February 8, 2019, Bissonnette was sentenced to life in prison, with no possibility of parole for 40 years. Upon appeal, the Court of Appeal of Quebec found 40 years without parole to be unconstitutionally cruel and unusual punishment, adjusting the sentence to life in prison with no possibility of parole for 25 years. Quebec prosecutors sought to reinstate the original sentence with an appeal to the Supreme Court of Canada. The decision was upheld on May 27, 2022 in R v Bissonnette, meaning Bissonnette will be eligible for parole in 2042.

The shooting prompted widespread discussion of anti-Muslim bigotry, racism, and right-wing terrorism in Canada. Prime Minister Justin Trudeau called the shooting a terrorist attack, but Bissonnette was not charged with the terrorism provision of the Criminal Code. The decision not to charge Bissonnette with terrorism was criticized by Canadian Muslim groups. On the fourth anniversary of the attack, the Trudeau government announced plans to commemorate the day of the attack as The National Day of Remembrance of the Quebec Mosque Attack and of Action Against Islamophobia.

== Background ==
The province of Quebec prioritizes immigrants who speak fluent French, and therefore has many Muslim immigrants from former French colonies such as Senegal, as well as Syria, Lebanon, and the North African countries of the Maghreb. A number of Muslim French citizens with family origins in the former French colonies have immigrated to Quebec from France. Arab residents of the province make up a larger share of its population than in any other Canadian province (though not all are Muslim and Ontario has the largest population percentage of Muslims). Like most immigrants to Quebec, they are concentrated in Montreal, Quebec's largest city.

Quebec City has a Muslim population of about 10,000 (according to the data from April 2019). It has a low crime rate — in 2015, there were only two homicides in the city – but saw a threefold increase in the number of reported hate crimes against Muslims in 2017. A competitive media market of local right-wing radio talkshow hosts features regular attacks on Islam and Muslims as being incompatible with the values of Quebec society.

The Islamic Cultural Centre of Quebec City's Grande Mosquée de Québec in the city's west-end Sainte-Foy neighbourhood is one of several mosques in Quebec City. The mosque is close to the Université Laval, which has many international students from French-speaking, Muslim-majority African countries. In June 2016, during Ramadan, it was the target of an incident in which a pig's severed head was left outside the mosque. The incident has been described as a hate crime because of pigs being deemed haram (forbidden) in Islam. There had been at least seven prior incidents at the mosque. Because of the incidents, the mosque had installed eight CCTV security cameras. Two weeks before the shooting, the mosque had finalized plans to install a fortified main entrance and a back escape exit for Ramadan in June.

== Shooting ==
The shooting took place at the Islamic Cultural Centre of Quebec City in the Ste-Foy suburb of Quebec City between 7:54 and 7:56 p.m EST on Sunday 29 January 2017 after nightly evening prayers. The shooter, 27-year-old Alexandre Bissonnette, killed six people and injured five while firing five 10-round magazines from a 9mm Glock 17 Gen 5 semi-automatic pistol. The perpetrator fled the scene and gave himself up to police later that evening, and pleaded guilty as charged to six counts of first degree murder and six counts of attempted murder with a restricted firearm on January 30, 2017. Detailed facts of the attack using witness testimony and six security camera recordings were made public in April 2018 by the prosecution during the perpetrator's sentencing hearing and put to rest conspiracy theories that a second shooter was involved. Superior Court judge François Huot prohibited publication of the video footage, but allowed the press to publish descriptions. Details were summarized in the sentence handed down on February 8, 2019.

=== Context ===
In the month before the shooting, Bissonnette was on leave from his job at Héma-Québec with an anxiety disorder following an altercation with a co-worker. In this month he obsessively visited the Twitter accounts of several right wing media personalities including Ben Shapiro, Tommy Robinson, Laura Ingraham, Alex Jones, Mike Cernovich, Gavin McInnes and Kellyanne Conway. Bissonnette checked in on the Twitter account of Ben Shapiro 93 times in the month leading up to the shooting. He was also on vacation from his university program of study in political science. He was due to go back to work the day after the shooting. During his time off, he would regularly visit Islamophobic websites and search the Web for information on mass shooters. On the day of the shooting, he had breakfast while reading web content dealing with jihadi attacks, mass murder, and suicide. Through the afternoon, he became drunk by consuming sake as he read about mass shooters. When he learned from television that the Canadian government would begin to welcome refugee claimants fearing Trump administration immigration policies and arriving at the U.S. border, he decided to proceed with the long-planned shooting. At 4:14 PM, the shooter visited the Facebook page of the Quebec City Mosque. At 5:28 p.m., he went to Prime Minister Justin Trudeau's Twitter account and read the tweet welcoming those seeking refuge in Canada. He went to his parents' house for dinner, and went to his bedroom to look at more websites on mass shootings and suicide.

At 7:00 p.m., Bissonnette turned off his computer and left his parents' home armed with a concealed pistol in his pocket and a .223 Remington vz. 58 Sporter semi-automatic rifle that he had packed into a guitar case. He told his parents he was going to run errands and practise shooting at a gun club he frequented weekly. He drove his parents' Mitsubishi to the mosque. At 7:37 p.m., he hesitated to follow through with the shooting and drove to a nearby convenience store to buy and quickly drink a Vodka Ice. Believing he had been seen in possession of firearms and that he would eventually be caught, he decided to go through with the shooting.

Prayers at the mosque started at 7:30 p.m. and ran for about 15 minutes. About half the attendees then left; 46 people remained for individual prayers and socializing in the large prayer hall.

=== Attack on the mosque ===
Just before 7:54 p.m, Bissonnette walked up the snow-covered driveway to the front of the mosque, opened the case carrying the rifle, and loaded it. Two brothers, Mamadou Barry, age 42, and Ibrahima Barry, age 39, put on their coats in the lobby of the mosque as others in the main room socialized or prayed privately. Just after 7:54, they left the building. The gunman pointed his rifle at them and pulled the trigger, but the gun jammed. Frightened, the brothers backed against the front door, slipped on the ice, and fell. The shooter dropped the rifle, feigned a smile to indicate it was a joke, and took out a pistol from under his coat. The Barry brothers quickly got up to flee, but Bissonnette opened fire, hitting Ibrahima in the left arm, back, and abdomen, causing him to collapse. He then approached the fallen victim, shooting him in the head. Mamadou Barry, hit in the shoulder and thigh, attempted to flee before collapsing several feet away. Bissonnette then shot him in the head.

Two other worshippers at the doorway saw the gunman approach and fled down the lobby corridor to the main prayer room. Panic then ensued in the prayer room. The shooter entered the mosque, firing all ten rounds in his semi-automatic pistol. He used the ensuing chaos to retreat into the lobby and reload. Several men rushed into the mihrab to hide, while others escaped through emergency exits. One man managed to grab a child and hide her behind a column.

At 7:55 p.m., Bissonnette re-entered the prayer room. He fired 30 rounds in 30 seconds during the second spree particularly targeting people attempting to take cover near the mihrab and the imam's office. He calmly shot at people hiding in the mihrab, killing Khaled Belkacemi, a 60-year-old University of Laval professor. Abdelkrim Hassane, aged 41, was killed near the imam's office. Aymen Derbali, crouched near the shooter, attempted to distract him from more crowded areas of the mosque by lurching towards him, but was shot in the knee and chin. As Derbali slumped and crawled on the floor, Bissonette shot him six more times, but Derbali would survive. Bissonnette then targeted 44-year-old Aboubaker Thabti, murdering him at point-blank range with three bullets to the skull. About 20 seconds into the second phase of the attack, 57-year-old Azzeddine Soufiane, a local grocer and butcher, rushed Bissonnette, propelling the shooter into a shoe rack against the wall. Bissonnette managed to push Soufiane back far enough to free his hand and shoot him twice. The gunman then shot Nizar Gali in the back and shot Said Akjour in the left shoulder as he hid in the mihrab.

Bissonnette retreated into the lobby a second time, reloading his weapon and returning to the prayer room in four seconds. Finding Soufiane still moving, the assailant shot him in the head. The attacker then moved to the middle of the prayer room to get a better angle, but most people who crowded in the mihrab were well protected.

At 7:56, the shooter finally exited through the main entrance and fled in his father's car, leaving his rifle and guitar case behind. He kept one round in his pistol to kill himself in the Charlevoix woods, north of the city. Police would later recover a total of four magazines and 48 9-mm casings from the pistol inside the mosque, as well as 28 rounds still in the rifle outside, with the one jammed round.

Seconds later, Mohamed Belkadhir, a University of Laval engineering student who had left the meeting to shovel snow, arrived at the mosque entrance and called 911 when he found the Barry brothers. He checked inside the mosque, then returned to tend the first two victims, removing his coat to cover Mamadou, who still showed signs of life. When police arrived with their weapons drawn, Belkadhir fled, believing the killer had returned. He was caught and arrested as a suspect and held overnight, but was released the next morning. Reports of the arrest led to rumours and online conspiracy theories about a second shooter. Police released an affidavit in March 2017 to confirm details of this arrest.

== Victims ==
Six people were killed, and five were seriously injured in the attack. An additional 35 witnesses were inside the mosque. Initial reports also said between eight and 19 others were treated for minor injuries.

The six murder victims were Ibrahima Barry (aged 39, Quebec government IT worker), Mamadou Tanou Barry (aged 42, accounting technician), Khaled Belkacemi (aged 60, professor at Laval University), Aboubaker Thabti (aged 44, pharmacy technician), Abdelkrim Hassane (aged 41, Quebec government computer analyst) and Azzedine Soufiane (aged 57, grocery store owner). Two were Guineans, two Algerians, one Moroccan and one Tunisian, all dual citizens of Canada. Eyewitness and video surveillance indicate that Soufiane was fatally shot after rushing and grappling with the shooter, saving several lives. Many mourners described him as a hero.

Soufiane was posthumously awarded the Star of Courage, Canada's second-highest award for non-military bravery by the Governor General of Canada. Four people were awarded the Medal of Bravery, including Said Akjour and Mohamed Khabar for their own attempts to confront the shooter, Hakim Chambaz for saving a young girl, and Aymen Derbali, who was paralyzed after trying to draw the shooter's attention away from other worshippers.

== Perpetrator ==
Alexandre George-Henri Bissonnette (born December 1, 1989), a student at Université Laval and former Canadian Army cadet, was identified as the suspect. He called police from the area near the Île d'Orléans Bridge, and told them he was involved and wanted to surrender. Université Laval announced that Bissonnette would not be allowed on campus while judicial proceedings were underway.

Bissonnette grew up in Cap-Rouge. Neighbours said his father and mother were both present in his life and were model parents, adding that they had never had a problem with either him or his twin brother Mathieu. Former acquaintances say he was introverted and sometimes bullied at school. He was not known to police, and he had no court records other than traffic violations. Before the shooting he had been living in an apartment near the mosque along with his twin brother.

People who knew Bissonnette said he had far-right, white nationalist, and anti-Muslim views. He had a particular fascination with school shootings and white supremacist Dylann Roof, who perpetrated the Charleston church shooting. The manager of a refugee-support Facebook page said Bissonnette frequently denigrated refugees and feminists online. A member of the mosque said Bissonnette had met and talked with him outside the mosque on January 26, believing he was interested in Islam, but he veered away from the subject. Bissonnette checked in on the Twitter account of Ben Shapiro, editor-in-chief of the conservative news site The Daily Wire, 93 times in the month leading up to the shooting. Bissonnette was also a supporter of Donald Trump and Marine Le Pen. Despite his support for right-wing politicians, he also praised separatist centre-left Parti Québécois and promoted the party's nationalist policies.

He later told police that he was motivated by the 2014 shootings at Parliament Hill, Ottawa, where a Canadian soldier guarding the National War Memorial was killed. Bissonnette was taking Paxil at the time of the attack.

=== Prosecution ===
==== Criminal trial ====
Bissonnette was charged with six counts of first-degree murder and six counts of attempted murder on January 30. Although the Canadian prime minister and Quebec premier both condemned Bissonnette's actions as a terrorist attack, charges of terrorism were not brought; according to Canadian legal experts, in the Canadian Criminal Code, the offence of terrorism requires not only acts of violence, but usually also collaboration with a terrorist group, which would be difficult to prove for a single gunman. Bissonnette was included in 2018 Public Report on the Terrorism Threat to Canada in the context of Right-Wing Extremism. The six counts of murder would amount to a maximum possible sentence of 150 years without parole under the 2011 Ending Sentence Discounts for Multiple Murders Act (Criminal Code section 745.51). Evidence against the suspect was provided to the defence team on February 21. The defence team's request for a publication ban on future proceedings was also granted.

Bissonnette told police officers he was motivated by Justin Trudeau's response to Donald Trump's travel ban, and that he was convinced that refugees were a threat to his family. After initially pleading not guilty to all charges on March 24, 2018, Bissonnette pleaded guilty to all charges on March 28, 2018. On February 8, 2019, the court sentenced him to life imprisonment with no parole for at least 40 years. On March 8, 2019, it was reported Bissonnette would appeal the sentence.

==== Appeals Court ====
On November 26, 2020, the verdict on Bissonnette's appeal was delivered. A 3-panel judge of the Quebec Court of Appeal unanimously struck down section 745.51 of the Criminal Code. They found that it violated section 12 of the Canadian Charter of Rights and Freedoms, which prohibits cruel and unusual punishment. Accordingly, Bissonnette's parole ineligibility was reduced from 40 to 25 years.

==== Supreme Court of Canada ====
On January 30, 2021, the prosecution applied for leave to appeal the ruling to the Supreme Court of Canada. The Supreme Court affirmed the lower court's ruling that consecutive life sentences are unconstitutional.

== Aftermath ==
=== Police response and arrest ===
Police created a dragnet and closed the bridge to the Île d'Orléans while searching for suspects. One individual was initially detained at the mosque by police. Bissonnette surrendered near the Île d'Orléans after he contacted 9-1-1 at 8:10 pm, proclaimed himself as the shooter involved and gave them his location. According to one early report, a man who presented himself as a witness said two attackers dressed in black and with Québécois accents entered the mosque and shouted "Allahu Akbar" before shooting.

Police later determined that there was only one gunman and said only one of the detained individuals was considered a suspect. The other individual was released shortly afterwards, and is considered a witness. He later said he was outside the mosque when he heard the shooting and went inside when it ceased. He added that he mistook the arrival of the armed police as the shooter returning and fled, after which he was arrested. According to an affidavit released to the media in March, he was administering first aid to the victims when he was arrested. It also said a chase of a possible suspect ensued after a police officer pulled a gun and ordered him to freeze. The man was later arrested.

Police began treating the attack as a terrorist incident at 10:00 pm, and activated the Structure de gestion policière contre le terrorisme (SGPCT) (Structure of police management against terrorism) protocol, a protocol for acts of terrorism in the region. It gave control of the investigation to the provincial Integrated National Security Enforcement Team—a joint anti-terrorism task force comprising the Montreal police, the Sûreté du Québec, and the Royal Canadian Mounted Police. At 10:40 pm, police declared the situation under control, with the building secured and the occupants evacuated.

=== Treatment of the wounded ===
The injured were transported to different hospitals in Quebec City, such as the Hôpital de l'Enfant-Jésus and the Centre hospitalier de l'Université Laval.

=== Future security measures ===
Philippe Pichet, the chief of Montreal police, and Maxime Pedneaud-Jobin, the mayor of Gatineau, both announced their cities would increase security around local mosques. Martin Coiteux, the provincial public security minister, said religious buildings in the province would be protectively surveilled, those in the capital by the Quebec City police.

=== Vigils and commemorations ===
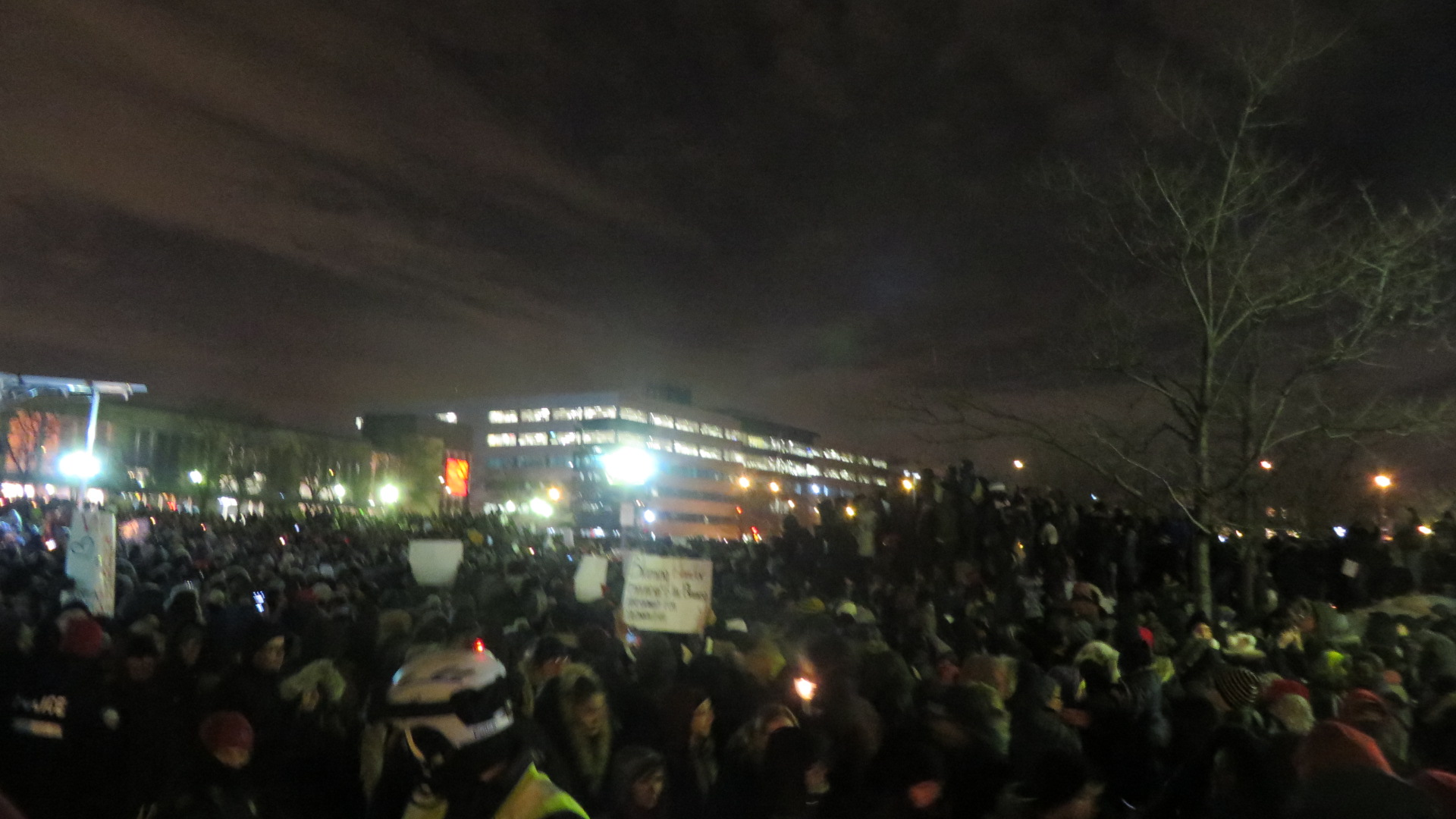
A vigil in Montreal's Park Extension.

On January 30, public vigils and gatherings were held across Canada to show sympathy to the victims of the shooting, their families and their community. The largest assembly, held in Quebec City, was attended by the prime minister and his wife, and leaders of all official federal parties. After speeches, a procession walked in silence to the site of the attack and left flowers before the mosque. The government of Quebec also set up a register of condolences where citizens can send testimonies to the victims of the attack and the families of the dead.

=== Impact on first responders ===
The shooting had secondary casualties that only manifested after the event. Andréanne Leblanc, 31, was found dead in March 2018, dressed in her paramedic's uniform. She was on duty that January night when she received the urgent call to head to the mosque in the city's Sainte-Foy district. She is regarded by the citizens of Québec City and her peers as the seventh victim of the shooting. Her suicide has highlighted the lack of mental health resources for first responders. They are often mentally injured with post-traumatic stress disorder, or the same symptoms, sometimes years after similar or repeated traumatic interventions. Leblanc's case is regarded as a catalyst that brought Public Safety Minister Ralph Goodale and Minister of Health Ginette Petitpas Taylor to release in April 2019 "Supporting Canada's Public Safety Personnel: An Action Plan on Post Traumatic Stress Injuries". The announcement brought with it $29 million in new funding.

=== Christchurch mosque shootings ===
The suspect in the Christchurch mosque shootings, Brenton Tarrant, covered the weapons used in the attacks with various white-supremacist and anti-Muslim symbols and references. He also wrote the names of various people, including Alexandre Bissonnette's.

== Government reactions ==
Quebec City Mayor Régis Labeaume declared that the city would stand with the victims' families through what he called a "terrible ordeal that defies reason". Quebec Premier Philippe Couillard offered solidarity with the families and friends of the victims, and tweeted, "Quebec categorically rejects this barbaric violence." He also denounced the attack as terrorism and ordered that flags at the National Assembly of Quebec be flown at half-mast. Labeaume and Couillard, along with Martin Coiteux, the provincial Minister of Public Safety, held a joint press conference and called for unity. At the conference, Couillard told Quebec's Muslim population "We're with you. You are home, you are welcome in your home. We're all Québécois."

Canadian Prime Minister Justin Trudeau also extended his condolences to the victims and denounced the shooting as a "cowardly attack" and as a "terrorist attack on Muslims in a centre of worship and refuge". In a Senate hearing, Royal Canadian Mounted Police Commissioner Bob Paulson called the suspect a "criminal extremist" and warned about the type of terrorism arising from easily influenced people being radicalized because of growing political polarization and "caustic" political debate.

Various world leaders expressed their condolences over the attack. Pope Francis, Russian President Vladimir Putin, and U.S. President Donald Trump contacted Prime Minister Trudeau and offered him assistance.

On the anniversary of the attack, January 29, 2018, Prime Minister Trudeau spoke before the House and said that the victims were "gunned down by ignorance and hatred, fuelled by Islamophobia and racism", and further stated: "These attacks sought to divide this country and its citizens, drive wedges between neighbours, and make enemies of strangers". Andrew Scheer also stated the "shooting was an act of terror", and that: "Last year's attack was a hate crime that took six innocent lives."

== Legacy ==
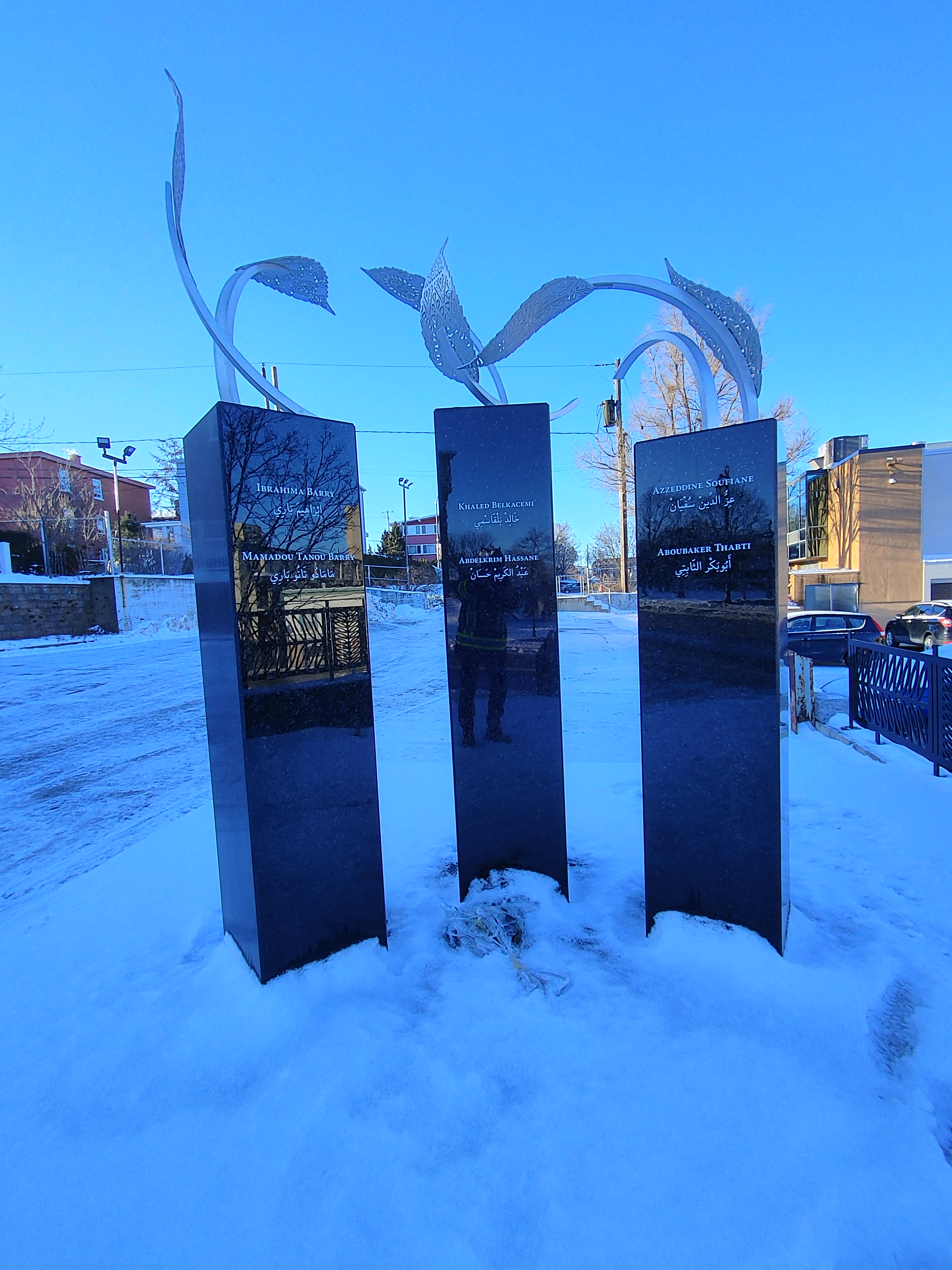
Three pillars which are part of the memorial to the victims: Vivre ensemble (Living together)

The Mosque: A Community's Struggle, a documentary film by Ariel Nasr about the shooting and its aftermath, premiered in 2020.

== See also ==
- Racism in Quebec
- Racism in Canada
- List of massacres in Canada
- Mass shootings in Canada
- Islamophobia in Canada
- List of rampage killers (religious, political, or ethnic crimes)
- Charleston church shooting
- Christchurch mosque shootings
