= Tidings =

Tidings or The Tidings may refer to:

== Books and journals ==
- An-Naba Sūrat an-Nabaʼ (Arabic:, “The Tidings”, “The Announcement”) seventy-eighth chapter (sura) of the Quran
- The Tidings , former name of newspaper, now Angelus (magazine), of the Los Angeles Roman Catholic Archdiocese
- Christadelphian Tidings
- Ashland Daily Tidings
- West Linn Tidings

== Music ==
- Tidings (album), by Allison Crowe, 2004
- Tidings, an album by Wolf People, 2010

== See also ==
- Glad Tidings (disambiguation)
