= Lisa Young =

Lisa Young may refer to:

- Lisa Young (golfer) (born 1960), Canadian golfer later known as Lisa Walters
- Lisa Young (gymnast) (born 1966), British gymnast
- Lisa Young (musician), Australian jazz vocalist
- Lisa Marie Young (1981–2002), missing Canadian
- Lisa R. Young, registered dietitian nutritionist
