= Disappearance of Lisa Marie Young =

Nanaimo BC woman missing since 2002

Lisa Marie Young
- Lisa Marie Young prior to her disappearance
- Born: May 5, 1981; Nanaimo, British Columbia, Canada
- Disappeared: June 30, 2002 (aged 21); Nanaimo, British Columbia, Canada
- Status: Missing for 24 years, 4 months and 23 days
- Height: 5 ft 4 in (163 cm)

On June 30, 2002, Lisa Marie Young, a 21‑year‑old Indigenous Canadian woman, disappeared from Nanaimo, British Columbia. Earlier that night, she had attended a local nightclub and two house parties before accepting a ride to a fast‑food restaurant from a man, Christopher William Adair, whom she and her friends had met at the club. Young has never been found, and her disappearance is being investigated as a homicide.

== Early life ==
Lisa Marie Young was the eldest child and only daughter of Don Young and Marlene "Joanne" Martin. She has two younger brothers, Brian and Robin. Growing up in Nanaimo, she attended Brechin Elementary and Woodlands Secondary School. Young's maternal grandfather (Martin's father, Moses Martin) is Tribal Chief of the Tla-o-qui-aht First Nation on the West Coast of Vancouver Island; Joanne and both of her parents (Moses and Cecilia) attended Kakawis Residential School on nearby Meares Island.

Young was close with her family. Martin described her as an independent woman who was a hard worker with a hard head, and had "inner strength that was totally awesome." Dallas Hulley, an acquaintance of Young and the last person to hear from her, described Young as "outgoing, confident, bubbly," and said "She was somebody you noticed right away, at a party or a gathering, or whatever it was. She just had a light about her." Young was a vegetarian and a fitness enthusiast and enjoyed rollerblading at the waterfront.

She and a roommate lived next door to her parents in a Barons Road apartment building, but at the time of Young's disappearance, her father was helping her move into her own apartment in northern Nanaimo, something she was excited about. Young was also preparing to start a job at a call centre within two days of her disappearance, and considering pursuing higher education, with the hopes of becoming a television sports broadcaster.

== Disappearance ==
On the night of June 29, 2002, Young left her parents' residence at 11:00 p.m. to go to a nightclub with several friends. Her parents found it strange, as Young had a busy schedule for the week.

Young and Hulley were approached by Christopher William Adair, who invited them to a house party, offering them a ride in the red older-model Jaguar he was driving. They went to the party, and then to a second house party in the Cathers Lake area of Nanaimo. When Young said she was hungry, Adair offered to take her to get some food. Around 4:30 a.m. Young called Hulley's cellphone. Hulley later stated in an interview, "Sure enough it's Lisa on her cellphone. She goes 'Dallas, I don't know what's going on. This guy won't bring me back. We're sitting in a driveway on Bowen Road and he won't bring me back.' She says, 'I'm bored. I'm getting pissed off.'"

The final signal from Young's cell phone was traced to the Departure Bay area of Nanaimo.

== Investigation ==
On July 1, 2002, Young's parents failed to hear from her. At first, they thought it was possible Young was too busy to answer her cellphone but grew concerned when Young's former roommate visited to ask about Young's whereabouts. After calling every phone number in her phone book, Young's parents contacted the Royal Canadian Mounted Police (RCMP) detachment in Nanaimo. In the beginning, Young's parents were told to call when she had been missing for over 48 hours, however, an RCMP officer came over to the Young's household later that evening to ask questions and get a photograph of Young. A few days later, the RCMP told Young's parents that her disappearance was being investigated by their Serious Crime Unit.

Police concluded that foul play was likely involved after Young left a house party in the Cathers Lake area and subsequently, several searches were conducted in remote areas in and near Nanaimo, revealing nothing.

In late July 2002, police questioned Adair, the driver of the Jaguar. Young's mother was taken by RCMP to a short meeting with Adair. She later stated that she asked him to tell her where her daughter was, and he replied, "I can't ... I'm sorry, I don't mean to disrespect your family." The man was eventually later released; no charges were laid. Police later stated, "The driver, like many others involved in this file, is simply a person of interest." The Jaguar was eventually located, seized by RCMP for inspection, and later released. It was determined that the car was owned by the driver's grandmother, who subsequently sold the Jaguar, and threatened to sue over talk that could implicate her grandson in the disappearance. Police did not begin searching for Young until she had been missing for two months, "leaving the job for ... relatives and friends to do on their own."

Following a one-year vigil held for Young in 2003, Lisa's mother was contacted by Chemainus psychic Christine Brant. Based on the information provided by Brant, Young's family asked Terry Tom and Andrew Jackson — both certified divers from Young's west coast Tla-o-qui-aht band — to search the reservoirs at Colliery Dam Park, located between Nanaimo Lakes Road and Harewood Mines Road. A private dive team conducted a subaqueous search at the park on July 25, 2003.

In December 2020, Nanaimo RCMP conducted searches related to the case, at two locations in Nanaimo, as well as part of Morrell Nature Sanctuary. One of the locations was a residential property located at 827 Nanaimo Lakes Road, which is adjacent to Morrell Sanctuary and less than 200 meters from Colliery Dam's upper reservoir.

In June 2021, the Nanaimo RCMP hosted a press conference "to provide an update on the status of the Lisa Marie Young missing person investigation". RCMP Cpl. Markus Muntener, current co-lead investigator on the case, reported that based on new and historical information, "numerous searches" for Young have taken place in the last year, utilizing ground-penetrating radar and a police dog, and he said additional searches at undisclosed locations were planned.

There have been no arrests made in connection to Young's disappearance, despite police having received "15,000 documents and hundreds of witnesses in Young's file".

In February 2022, an anonymous American donor offered a US$50,000 (CA$62,500) reward for information that leads investigators to the location of Young's remains. RCMP Constable Hayley Pinfold stated that investigators are "hoping that this might be enough to encourage some of those people to bring those final pieces forward". Police have stated that they believe that finding Young's remains would be the break they need, and called the reward offer "significantly important."

=== Search efforts ===
==== Family ====
On July 3, 2002, Young's family contacted the local media; the next morning the story was on the front page of the Nanaimo Daily News, "Parents fear daughter the victim of foul play". The following day the story was in the news in the provincial capital, Victoria, and by the following week, it was picked up by newspapers province-wide.

Young's father's employer, Purolator Courier, printed thousands of "missing person" posters which the company's delivery drivers distributed to businesses across Vancouver Island. Within days, posters were visible at the majority of Island stores and businesses.

Young's extended family and First Nations members put up a reward of $11,500 for information about the case.

Between July and December 2002, dissatisfied with police efforts on the case, Tla-o-qui-aht Chief Moses Martin (Young's grandfather) organized the Tribal Search & Rescue into several massive search efforts in multiple locations in Nanaimo and other communities, "from Coombs to Tofino". For each search, Search & Rescue members would commute from Tofino, a 3-hour drive to Nanaimo. Search teams consisted of up to 30 volunteers, as well as divers who searched a reservoir at Colliery Dam Park. Searches took place between July and December 2002, and in the spring/summer of 2003.

The family contacted Young's bank and cellphone provider and were able to determine that the bank account had funds but no activity, and the final signal from Young's phone was sent from the Departure Bay area of Nanaimo.

==== Community ====
Locations significant to Young's disappearance

Many area businesses made donations to the search effort.

The owner and staff of the Jungle Cabaret made a "generous cash donation" to the search fund, and also donated the use of a billboard near Petroglyph Park. (Note: Paul Manhas was the owner of the Jungle Cabaret (the club Young visited the night she disappeared). He also owned several other local bars; Young had worked at 3 of them (Old Flag Inn, Palace Hotel, Jungle Cabaret; all within 200 metres of each other). She resigned in April 2002, leaving on good terms, and continued to visit the establishments regularly as a customer.) Another billboard was installed on the side of the Foundry Pub in 2003.

For several months beginning in December 2019, billboard advertising space was rented alongside the Island Highway near Nanoose Bay, with large signage stating "Lisa Marie Young, Missing, Brown Eyes, 5'4", Tattoo Flower Band on Right Arm, Call Nanaimo RCMP". Funding for the rental and signage was raised through private sales of beaded red dress pins and earrings, handmade by volunteers of the "Lil' Red Dress Project". A related public art installation titled "The REDress Project", was created in 2010 by Métis artist Jaime Black, in response to the missing and murdered Indigenous women (MMIW) epidemic in Canada and the United States. The installation has been exhibited in more than 30 locations around North America, most recently at the Smithsonian Institution in Washington, DC. Annually since 2010, "Red Dress Day" is honoured on Young's birthday, the 5th of May.

=== False claims ===
Within 2 weeks of Young's disappearance, members of her extended family received several phone calls from unknown callers claiming that Young's body had been located in nearby Lantzville. RCMP stated that a week earlier, similar rumours had appeared on multiple online chat sites, therewith claiming that Young's body was located in the nearby town of Ladysmith. In August 2003, RCMP issued a second statement refuting new claims that had surfaced again saying that Young's body has been recovered. The statement went on to explain that these rumours were causing a great deal of anguish and distress for Young's family.

Similarities in the false claims, along with the fact that the incidents each started and stopped within short, specific time periods which aligned with spikes in investigative activity, raised questions as to whether the misinformation was purposeful in an attempt to distract investigators and the public, rather than being senseless hoaxes, as was initially assumed by the media and the RCMP.

=== Criticism of the RCMP ===
"It is very clear that the police did not respond in a proper way. It was members of her Tla-o-qui-aht First Nation who conducted searches on their own, without the aid of the RCMP."

— MP Paul Manly
at the House of Commons, October 8, 2020

The police investigation surrounding Young's disappearance has been publicly and repeatedly criticized by several members of Young's family, as well as journalists, bloggers, podcasters and politicians.

==== Initial response ====
When Young's mother first contacted RCMP at 11:30 a.m. on Monday, July 1, 2002 (Canada Day), she was initially told they would need to wait 48 hours before a missing person report can be filed for an adult. While a common myth, there is actually no waiting period in Canada. Criminology experts say the first 72 hours in a missing person investigation are the most critical. Later that evening an RCMP officer briefly stopped by to ask for a photo of Young.

Young's mother did not initially tell RCMP that her daughter was Indigenous because she was afraid that the report would not be taken seriously due to racist stereotypes.

When they still hadn't heard from Young by the next morning, her family had no doubt that something had happened to her. She was consistently reliable and punctual, and always kept in touch with family and friends. She was also excited about plans she'd made for the days ahead:

- She'd made specific arrangements for Monday involving her father and others who she'd asked to help her move into a new apartment, for which she'd already paid a security deposit and was to get keys on Monday, July 1st.
- She was recently hired for a customer service position at a large local call centre. Originally, she was scheduled to begin training later in the month, but she'd eagerly pushed to start sooner, successfully having her start date moved up to Tuesday, July 2nd.

On Tuesday, after Young failed to show up for either event, her mother tried repeatedly to contact the RCMP officer who had picked up the photo. She was eventually informed that the officer was off work until Friday, July 5th, so the matter would have to wait until then, but "nothing suggests foul play". Further persistence resulted in the case being assigned to a different constable on Wednesday, July 3rd.

On Saturday, July 6 the Nanaimo Daily News reported, "no evidence has emerged to indicate to police that foul play is involved". Nanaimo RCMP Const. Jack Eubank said "investigators become more concerned with every day that passes" and that they "have a number of tips they want to follow up" (Note: emphasis added.) including a claim that Young left the club as a passenger in a dark vehicle.

On July 9, the Daily News reported that Eubank said RCMP now have "5 serious crimes investigators working on the case" and they've had "two dozen tips".

On July 10th it was announced, "Nanaimo RCMP now believe a 21-year-old woman who went missing 10 days ago has met with foul play."

==== RCMP search efforts ====
RCMP statements leading up to initial search
July 25, 2002	RCMP have now received "100 to 150 tips" and will be following up "as soon as possible". (Note: No searches yet.)
"in August"	RCMP receive a tip that prompts them to plan their first ground search for Young. (Note: Tip was received around same time Jaguar driver was arrested in Yorkton, Saskatchewan for assaulting a police officer, and then charged with Breach of CSO. He was transported back to Nanaimo (2nd time in 2 months) and later found Guilty of the Yorkton charges -- and was sentenced to 1 day in jail.)
Sept 3	Original date RCMP intended to perform the search
Sept 10	Police "will perform a search in days ahead". Search was planned after Labour Day long weekend but postponed due to Sept 1st shooting of Rosella Centis. (Note: Rosella Centis was shot by her husband mid-day (September 1) at a gas station, in front of their daughter. The next day, her husband was arrested without incident at their home. (Centis was Italian/white.))
Sept 14	RCMP "will search several areas Tuesday"
Sept 18 (9am–noon)	1st RCMP ground search: 20+ officers and 2 dogs searched around Doumont & Biggs Roads. (Note: The news article describes the search area (based on the August tip) as a "wooded area South of Nanaimo" yet also says "near Doumont/Biggs Roads", which are actually in North end of the city. (Reporting error?))
Sept 19	"Further searches in different areas may be carried out in the future."
Nov 30	Young's extended family re-searched the Doumont & Biggs Road area.
Dec 2020	2nd RCMP ground search: Nanaimo Lakes Road residence (Note: There has probably been police action that has not been made public, and possible that other searches have taken place.) (Note: In 2002 an anonymous neighbour told police he saw a body in a hammock, and later, machinery moving dirt around. No action was taken at the time.)

===== Lack of manpower =====
In November 2002, RCMP Cpl. Doug Hogg said they have "no leads/information which makes them think they will solve the mystery" and described the case as "progressing slowly". He also stated that police "wanted to search another area North of the city but they have not been able to arrange the required number of officers to scour the brush."

In 2003, Tla-o-qui-aht band manager Francis Frank, one of the tribal search coordinators, said he supports the family in speaking out about their lack of confidence in Nanaimo RCMP's handling of Young's case. "Our relationship with the RCMP isn't the greatest to begin with. This situation doesn't help. Typically the RCMP waits no more than 72 hours to launch a search for missing persons. They have enough manpower, they need to start dedicating themselves to a real search."

==== RCMP vs Crime Stoppers ====
===== Video re-enactment =====
Persistent in the search for her daughter, Young's mother contacted Crime Stoppers to inquire about making a re-enactment video, referring to the production of a televised re-enactment of Young's movements prior to her disappearance. Crime Stoppers Const. Jossee Smith responded stating that the request needs to come from an RCMP investigator. Young's mother then asked one of the investigators to make the request to Crime Stoppers, but he told her he didn't feel it would be helpful at the time.

In the May 2003 interview by Paul Walton, Young's father expressed frustration because he had not heard from the police in three months and because they seem to have no interest in their suggestions of a Crime Stoppers spot. "How could a Crime Stoppers spot hurt?," he asked.

Nanaimo RCMP's then-spokesman Const. Jack Eubank told Walton, "Crime Stoppers no longer does re-enactments of crimes." However, Ha-Shilth-Sa (Note: The Ha-Shilth-Sa is "Canada's Oldest First Nation's Newspaper", based out of Port Alberni, published by the Nuu-Chah-Nulth Tribal Council.) journalist Ruth Ogilvie confirmed with Const. Smith that Crime Stoppers did not stop making re-enactment videos.

In apparent contradiction to the RCMP's 2003 statement, an announcement came in May 2009 that a Crime Stoppers re-enactment video would be produced jointly by Crime Stoppers and Shaw TV. Local actors volunteered to play the parts of key persons; Young was portrayed by Meghan Wearne. Nanaimo RCMP spokesman Const. Gary O'Brien said "We're hoping somebody may remember something. We're hoping it generates discussion." The footage aired on Shaw TV several times and can be viewed on YouTube.

===== Retraction of support for Crime Stoppers tipsters =====
From the first RCMP statement indicating concerns of "foul play" in Young's disappearance, almost every media statement made by police included instructions advising anyone with information about the case to "contact Crime Stoppers or Nanaimo RCMP"; this continued for at least 15 years. However, this stance recently changed as the case's current RCMP co-lead investigator Cpl. Markus Muntener began asking that potential tipsters do not contact Crime Stoppers and instead contact Muntener directly.

This was told to several people as well as in a February 3, 2022 announcement via Cyndy Hall (a friend of Young's, advocate for her case, and an administrator of a public Facebook group called "Lisa Marie Young") in the form of a Facebook post in the 5000+ member group, stating that submitting tips anonymously through Crime Stoppers can cause potential charges against a suspect to "be stayed by Crown" resulting in the case never going to court, linking to the Supreme Court of Canada's 1997 decision in R. v. Leipert. "Crimestoppers and the Nanaimo RCMP don't work together anymore. If you report a tip to Crimestoppers the police will not look into it." Potential tipsters are urged to trust Muntener yet are warned that the information provided "will become public if Lisa's case goes to court and what you told the police is part of Lisa's case".

In summary, informer privilege is of such fundamental importance to the workings of a criminal justice system that it cannot be balanced against other interests. Once established, neither the police nor the court possesses discretion to abridge it.

— R. v. Leipert, [1997], 1 S.C.R. 2

R. v. Leipert reinforced informer privilege in Canadian law, protecting the identity of lawful informants. Police cannot force or compel a Crime Stoppers tipster to identify themselves or to testify. "The identity of a Crime Stoppers tipster must never be disclosed without clear direction from a Court."

At some point between June 2019 and August 2021, Young's report on the RCMP website was edited to append the sentence, "Due to the nature of this investigation, Nanaimo RCMP Serious Crime Unit requests that anyone with information contact them directly." (Note: Below the updated report about Young's case, the web page still includes contact information for Crime Stoppers, thereby contradicting the updated section.)

==== Parliament ====
During a House of Commons debate in Ottawa on October 8, 2020, discussing the amendment of Bill C-3 to the Indian Act, M.P. Paul Manly presented several concerns surrounding the handling of Young's case, stating allegations that police efforts and investigation were affected by Young's Indigenous heritage. He also shared several egregious concerns he has with the police investigation into Young's disappearance, including:

- Concern that Young's case had only received recent attention due to the popularity of Palmer's Where is Lisa? podcast, which also made it "very clear that the police did not respond in a proper way."
- RCMP "did not engage in a ground search" until Young had been missing for 79 days. "It was members of...the Tla-o-qui-aht First Nation of the Tofino area...who conducted searches on their own, without the aid of the RCMP."
- "RCMP did not interview anybody from the nightclub" [including staff and some of Young's friends].
- Young's family had been asking for a Crime Stoppers video" yet RCMP did not authorize one until 7 years later, and there was also concern about the choice of actors to portray the driver of the Jaguar. "They botched that." See also: § Video re-enactment
- concerns over police handling of potential physical evidence, specifically that "the car used to drive Lisa to her death location" was not examined by the RCMP until after the car's owner had it steam-cleaned and detailed. "If this young woman had been the daughter of a judge, a mayor or a member of the House...police would have been all over this right away."
- "RCMP dismissed an urgent call from a witness who is believed to be an associate and accomplice of Lisa's killers who called to alert the Young family that Lisa's body was being moved at the moment it was being moved from the original location." Manly stated that the RCMP "ignored" that caller due to her having connections to criminal activities.
- RCMP was slow to respond to callers who were "seeking to provide information on Lisa's disappearance or murder", and "in some instances, police entirely failed to respond."
- "One informant, a former associate of the prime suspect believed to be Lisa's killer...called the RCMP in 2006 to report details of Lisa's murder, a videotape of the crime and more. What people have said about this case is that Lisa was taken to make a snuff film. They said she was drugged, sexually assaulted and then killed by accident, that it was not the intention to actually go through with the whole process, but she apparently died in the process. The people who know about this have come forward to talk about it, but because they are all...known to police, it has not been investigated properly."
- concerns by many community members that the prime suspect in Young's case may be a police informant and, analogous to the gunman in the 2020 Nova Scotia attacks, "police have no obligation to release any of that information".
- "Lisa Marie's mother, Joanne, was taken to the Parksville Police Station to take part in an interview with [the driver of the Jaguar], who was the last person known to see Lisa alive. She was told by the RCMP to hug [the driver]. Who does that? How does this happen?"
- "RCMP and other police forces have not gone through the proper procedures of ensuring that these cases are investigated properly. These young indigenous women [...] have not had their cases taken seriously. If Lisa Marie Young had been a white woman and a daughter of a prominent business person in this community, that case would have been investigated properly."

Manly called the handling of the case "horrific" and asked that the federal government form a task force. He said that more education is needed for police and for "anybody going through law school", and he stated that his sister, a retired Ontario Provincial Police officer agrees that "there is not enough training for people before they get to have a gun, a badge and the power to police. We do need better national integration on these cases."

M.P. Gord Johns (Courtenay—Alberni, NDP) responded, stating that he is close friends with Chief Moses Martin (Young's grandfather), and acknowledging the efforts of Young's aunt, Carol Frank. Johns brought requests from Young's family that "RCMP officers have specific training on missing and murdered indigenous women" and that families of missing persons have "improved access to information" and a "penalty system...for not following through on that."

=== Jaguar Driver ===
Within four days of Young's disappearance, Young's mother and the RCMP had each received information that Young was seen getting into a dark red or maroon late-80s Jaguar. Around July 20, 2002, police identified the Jaguar driver's home in the small town of Qualicum Beach. Police spoke to the owner of the car and then located the driver, the owner's grandson, in Kamloops, BC.

RCMP subsequently took the man into custody in Nanaimo and questioned him about Young's disappearance.

Young's mother was taken by RCMP to confront the man at the Parksville RCMP detachment. She later described the interrogation room as small, with a large photo of Lisa and a whiteboard with the words Rape, Murder, Accident. An RCMP investigator asked Young's mother to hug the man, which she did, then she directly asked the driver to tell her where her daughter was, to which he responded "something like I can't before pausing and trailing off, I'm sorry, I don't mean to disrespect your family."

RCMP have stated that they believe there is a connection between Young's disappearance and the driver of the Jaguar. Sgt Chisholm said, "Suffice to say we feel strongly about an individual, but there isn't enough evidence to charge him."

The driver's grandmother subsequently sold the Jaguar and threatened to sue over talk that could implicate her grandson in the disappearance. The Jaguar was eventually located, seized by RCMP for with ultraviolet light and DNA testing, and later released after police found the vehicle had been steam-cleaned before it was sold.

The man was eventually released; no charges were laid in relation to Young's disappearance. Police later stated, "The driver, like many others involved in this file, is simply a person of interest." RCMP have not made an official statement about the outcome of their interview with the man, nor the man's explanation of when or where Young left the Jaguar or his unusual legal history at that point in time.

=== Parents "cut off" by RCMP ===
RCMP has never disclosed to Young's parents the driver's explanation of what happened to Young on the night she disappeared.

The release of the driver without any explanation of what happened to their daughter was extremely frustrating for Young's parents. However the meeting with the man resulted in them getting his name, and they were able to determine his Qualicum Beach address (Note: The address where the man was supposed to be living with his grandmother, as per terms of his CSO.), and they did what they could to take the investigation into their own hands, trying several ways to make contact with the man or his grandmother, with no success.

Young's father was distraught and prepared to alert the media about the man's release. Two officers from the Nanaimo detachment showed up at their house, warning Don they would charge him with obstruction of justice if he pursued media coverage. RCMP said they did not want Young's parents "interfering with the integrity of the RCMP."

Young's mother was later warned by RCMP for taking photos of the Jaguar from the street at the driver's grandmother's house. Young's father was warned by RCMP to stop emailing the grandmother. Young's father warned RCMP that he was adding the driver's name to the posters. RCMP responded, warning him not to. Various posters and cards were later distributed showing the man's name with a photo of the Jaguar, and in some cases, his photo (taken from Facebook).

Young's parents later received a letter from the RCMP cutting them off from further details about the case.

=== New information ===
In June 2021, Cpl. Muntener said new information has come to light. Muntener said there is information he can't share, as it is an active investigation, but police have "completed numerous searches in the last year" based on new information coming in, and "those searches were extensive and detailed and we have more of those searches planned in the future." Muntener also described the case as an "active and ongoing large-scale investigation involving some 15,000 documents and hundreds of witnesses."

That was the last time RCMP made public statement about Lisa, or the investigation into her disappearance.

=== Confidential tips via CBC ===
As part of ongoing coverage about Missing and Murdered Indigenous Women and Girls, CBC News has facilitated the anonymous and secure submission of information related to MMIWG cases, via SecureDrop. See also: § Retraction of support for Crime Stoppers tipsters

== Aftermath ==
Each year since 2003, Young's loved ones and supporters have gathered on or around June 30 for a "Walk for Lisa," beginning at the Nanaimo RCMP Detachment and marching through the streets of downtown Nanaimo to ensure her disappearance remains in the public eye.

Young's mother experienced health complications after Young vanished. Before she died on June 21, 2017, she had been taking dialysis, suffered from hypertension, and was on a waiting list for a kidney transplant. Martin's family members believe the cause of her deteriorating health was due to the stress of not knowing what happened to her daughter. Martin's sister, Carol Frank, revealed that Martin tried to hide her and Young's First Nations ancestry from the public, out of fear that Young would be assumed to be a sex worker, an alcohol or drug addict, or living on the streets.

Hulley, the last person to hear from Young, died on March 25, 2018. While walking along British Columbia Highway 19A with a 27-year-old female friend at 1:00 a.m., he stepped into the northbound lane to retrieve something he had dropped, only to be struck by a car. He was pronounced dead at 6:15 a.m. the same day. Although the 62-year-old female driver was driving at least ten kilometres under the speed limit, she was unable to avoid him, due to the lack of reflective clothing. He was 38 years old at the time of his death.

=== "Lisa's Song" ===
After Young's disappearance, singer Allison Crowe wrote Lisa's Song in memory of Young. Crowe and Young attended high school together in Nanaimo, becoming close friends. The track's original version was recorded in Crowe's living room, with her father on backup guitar. Several copies were handed out at vigils and other gatherings, and the single was later made available for purchase "at cost" at a local Mac's Convenience store. The track was later re-recorded and released as part of Crowe's first album, "Lisa's Song + 6 Songs". Lisa's Song had a #51 peak on MonthlyTreed's charts and has appeared on 5 of their charts.

=== Facebook group ===
A public Facebook group called "Lisa Marie Young" was created in November 2008 by Tara Hall. Hall was a close friend of Young, and she was out with Young on the night she disappeared. The group has over 8,000 members, continuing to expand and remaining active, and has become the de facto centre for advocacy in Young's case.

Other administrators include Carolann Bosma, admin since 2011 (Young's foster sister), Carol Frank since 2018 (Young's maternal aunt) and Cyndy Hall since 2021 (Young's friend; one of Young's mother's many phone calls on the morning after her disappearance).

== Political attention ==
=== House of Commons ===
Several Members of Parliament have discussed Young's case during debates at the House of Commons of Canada, including:

Date	Debates	M.P.	Riding	In office	Party	Hansard
May 13, 2009	No. 57 (40–2)	M.P. Todd Russell	Labrador	2005–2011	Lib	Hansard
• Russell discussed Young, asking for a "full, public and independent investigation".
October 8, 2020	No. 12 (43–2)	M.P. Paul Manly	Nanaimo—Ladysmith	2019–2021	GP	Hansard
• Manly presented a lengthy list of specific concerns. See also: § Parliament
June 21, 2021	No. 122 (43–2)	M.P. Paul Manly	Nanaimo—Ladysmith	2019–2021	GP	Hansard
• Manly discussed "pulled Instagram posts" related to Young's case.
November 26, 2021	No. 5 (44–1)	M.P. Lisa Barron	Nanaimo—Ladysmith	2021–present	NDP	Hansard
• Barron referred to Young, demanding "the government immediately implement the calls to justice of the Inquiry into MMIWG".
March 31, 2022	No. 50 (44–1)	M.P. Lisa Barron	Nanaimo—Ladysmith	2021–present	NDP	Hansard
• Barron shared statistics and concern that "it has been 20 years, and still Lisa's loved ones have no answers."

=== Inquiry into MMIW ===
On April 4, 2018, Young's maternal grandparents, Carla Moss and Chief Moses Martin (Tribal Chief of the 800-member Tla-o-qui-aht First Nation) were sworn speakers in Vancouver at the National Inquiry into Missing and Murdered Indigenous Women and Girls National Inquiry (public volume 82) by the Government of Canada under Prime Minister Justin Trudeau.

Moss and Chief Martin discussed the handling of Young's disappearance and the state of federal treatment and prioritization of cases like hers, including perceived prejudices by the RCMP and other factors over the past 200 years that led to the current situation. Indigenous women in Canada are 4 times more likely to be murdered than non-indigenous women.

Speaking under oath, Chief Martin told the inquiry, "We also made some recommendations up in Prince George that RCMP members ... should have special training about Indigenous people because of the ongoing racism that lives well in all of our communities." He went on to explain that he's been unsatisfied "with communication between the families and the RCMP. We hear nothing about the investigation, if there is one." Moss said, "Marlene [Young's mother] tried to hide that her and Lisa were First Nations when Lisa first went missing because she didn't want the police to blame Lisa's disappearance on her being First Nations." and "In the following days right after she went missing we lived two hours away and our family and other members of our community drove to Nanaimo and ... searched, and searched, and searched, and every weekend we spent searching, and that was in June, and ... the RCMP didn't conduct a search until September. That was pretty rough to see that they just didn't even bother."

Commissioner Michèle Audette responded, "Normally when we lose somebody or we call the police because our daughter or son is missing we expect that they start the search. So it wasn't the case for your family. Sorry about that."

The National Post's coverage of Chief Martin's testimony said "RCMP have not made an arrest and have not provided the family with regular updates. He also told the commission that police did not begin searching for Lisa Marie until she had been missing for two months, leaving the job for 30 relatives and friends to do on their own. 'The justice system doesn't seem to exist, at least in our view.'".

=== Municipal ===
In March 2021, Nanaimo Mayor Leonard Krog officially proclaimed June 26 as "Justice for Lisa Marie Young Day" and June 30 as "Lights on for Lisa" when people are encouraged to participate by leaving porch lights on to recognize Young's disappearance.

== Podcasts ==
Since 2016, several informative podcast episodes have been published online, raising awareness about Lisa's disappearance, and in some cases have generated new tips by motivating people with relevant information to come forward. As of May 2022, more than 20 podcasts have published over 30 episodes based on Young's case.

=== Casefile ===
In July 2016, popular Australian true-crime podcast Casefile published "Case 26: Lisa Marie Young" in which the show's anonymous host discussed Young disappearance and aspects of the investigation, including the identity and criminal record of the man police identified as the driver of the Jaguar with whom Young was last seen. The episode includes Allison Crowe's "Lisa's Song".

In December 2016, the host published a follow-up "Case 26: Lisa Marie Young – Update" to share that he had received written notice that the July 2016 episode was in breach of SoundCloud's terms of use, on the grounds of "violating an individual's right to privacy/publicity without consent". He later received similar warnings from Stitcher and iTunes, and requested more information about the complaint, and SoundCloud sent him a copy of the original complaint form. It said, "They do not have my permission to use my name ... birthdate ... city and my charges..." The timestamps included in the complaint line up to points when the host was discussing the driver of the Jaguar, and, while the complaint was signed only with a first name, it matches the first name of the driver.

The update episode acted as an "open letter" responding publicly to the complainant. The host clarified that no accusations were made, and no information was shared that wasn't already available to the public through the searchable BC Provincial Court's "Court Services Online" website which states that the information it contains "may be used without permission for public information and research". The host closed the episode with an offer directed to the complainant, asking that he contact the host, "to come on and have your say; we would be more than happy to make that happen any time."

=== Island Crime ===
In May 2020 Laura Palmer's true-crime podcast Island Crime published its inaugural season, entitled "Where Is Lisa?". Originally an 8-episode season entirely consisting of in-depth discussion and interviews surrounding the circumstances of Young's disappearance, two further episodic updates have since been added, totalling over 6 hours of relevant content.

The season has won several awards including the 2021 Webster award for "Best Feature/Enterprise Reporting", and it also appeared in a list published by the BC provincial government, of podcasts frequently listened to by BC's Provincial Court judges. The Globe and Mail said Palmer "heats up a cold case in a respectful, human way". Palmer was previously an executive producer for CBC Vancouver and is married to a Provincial Court judge.

This popularity contributed to the podcast being credited with generating significant new interest in the case including several tips which led investigators to conduct multiple new searches.

== See also ==
- List of people who disappeared mysteriously (2000–present)
- Missing and murdered Indigenous women
- Red Dress Day — recognized every May 5 (Young's birthday)
- Killing of Chantel Moore — Young's cousin, killed by an RCMP officer during a wellness check
- List of controversies involving the Royal Canadian Mounted Police
