= Hot water extraction =

Method of carpet cleaning

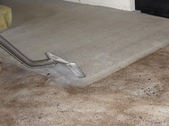
Example of the steam cleaning method, using a carpet cleaning wand.

Hot water extraction (HWE) is a method of carpet cleaning. It involves injecting a combination of hot water and cleaning agents into the fibers of a carpet and removing the lifted soil with a vacuum cleaner. It is sometimes called "steam cleaning".

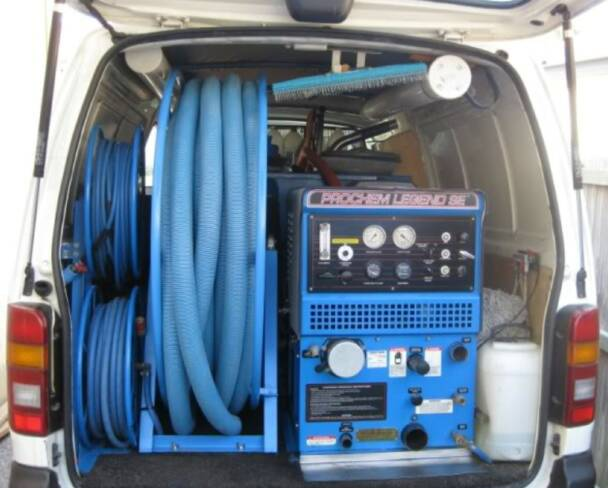
Truck-mounted hot water extraction machine

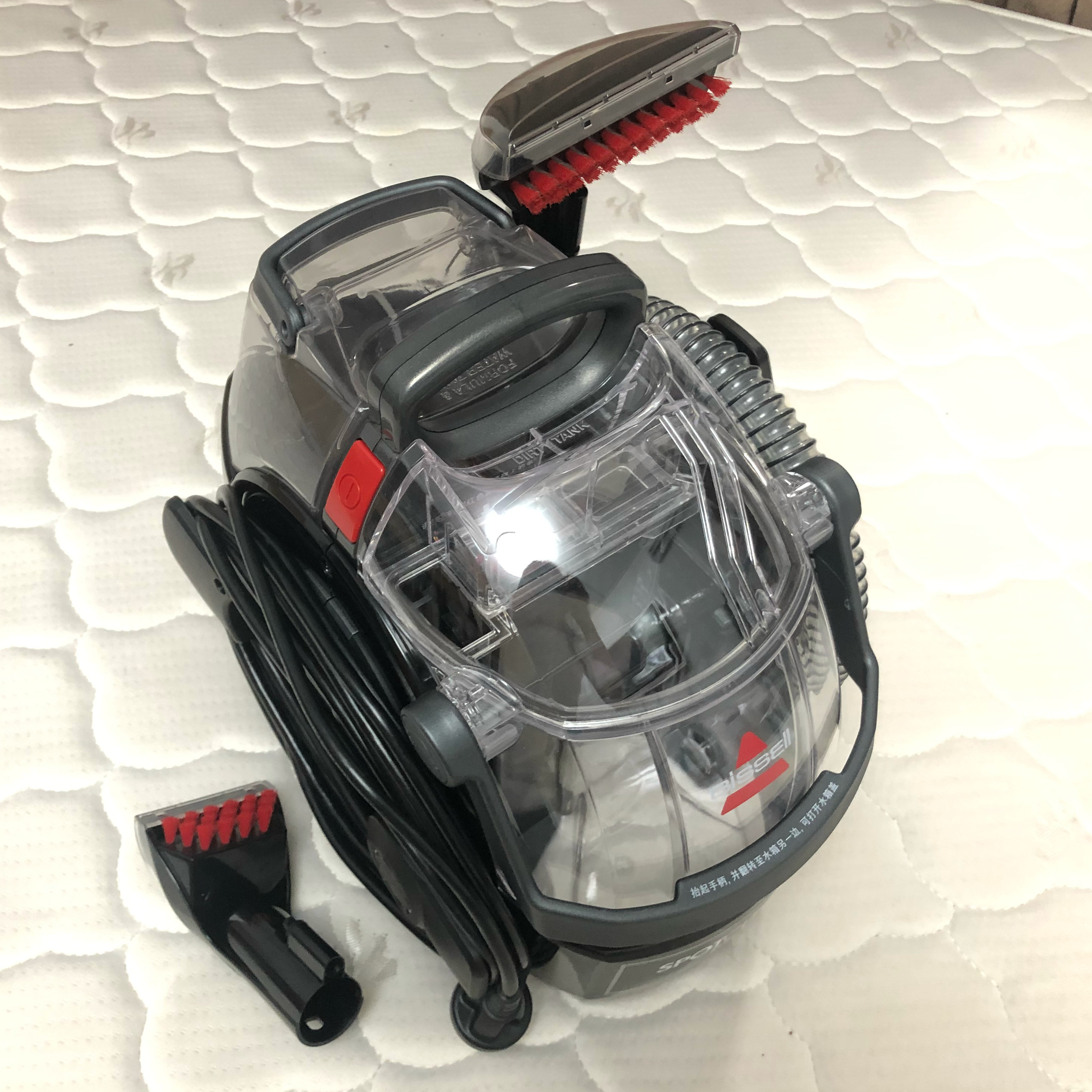
A portable carpet cleaner by Bissell. 3-liter fluid capacity.

== See also ==
- Floor cleaning
- Carpet cleaning
- Vapor steam cleaning
