= Lisa's Song (EP) =

Lisa's Song + 6 Songs

EP by Allison Crowe
- Released: November 5, 2003
- Recorded: 2001–2003
- Genre: Rock
- Length: 28:56
- Label: Rubenesque Records Ltd.
- Producer: Larry Anschell & Rick Erickson

Allison Crowe chronology
| Lisa's Song + 6 Songs (2003) | Tidings (2003) |

Professional ratings
Review scores
| Source | Rating |
|---|---|
| Great White Noise | link |

Lisa's Song + 6 Songs is the debut recording of Canadian singer-songwriter Allison Crowe. The tracks were recorded live-off-the-floor in two separate sessions. The first tracks were captured on an afternoon in July 2001, while Crowe was travelling to Seattle, Washington to perform concerts for fans of Pearl Jam at the Worldwide Jammer Convergence. The final session, in April 2003, was to add the title song for Lisa Marie Young, a high-school friend of Crowe who disappeared in 2002 under suspicious circumstances.

This recording has been released in three different EP versions titled Six Songs, Six Songs+, and Lisa's Song + 6 Songs.

Following the independent model of musicians Loreena McKennitt and Ani DiFranco, Crowe launched her own record label, Rubenesque Records Ltd., with the release of "Lisa's Song" in its various forms.

== Track listing ==
All tracks are written by Allison Crowe.

| No. | Title | Length |
|---|---|---|
| 1. | "Lisa's Song" | 4:17 |
| 2. | "Fade Away" | 4:12 |
| 3. | "Midnight" | 3:17 |
| 4. | "Crayon and Ink" | 4:40 |
| 5. | "Dark Blue" | 3:52 |
| 6. | "Scared" | 4:31 |
| 7. | "Philosophy" | 4:07 |
| Total length: | | 28:56 |

== Personnel ==
=== Musicians ===
- Allison Crowe – vocals, piano
- Dave Baird – acoustic bass, electric bass
- Kevin Clevette – drums

=== Production ===
- Larry Anschell – producer, engineer
- Rick Erickson – producer, engineer ("Lisa's Song")
- Gordon Christmas – cover photo
- Allison Crowe – art direction, inside photos
