= Live at Wood Hall =

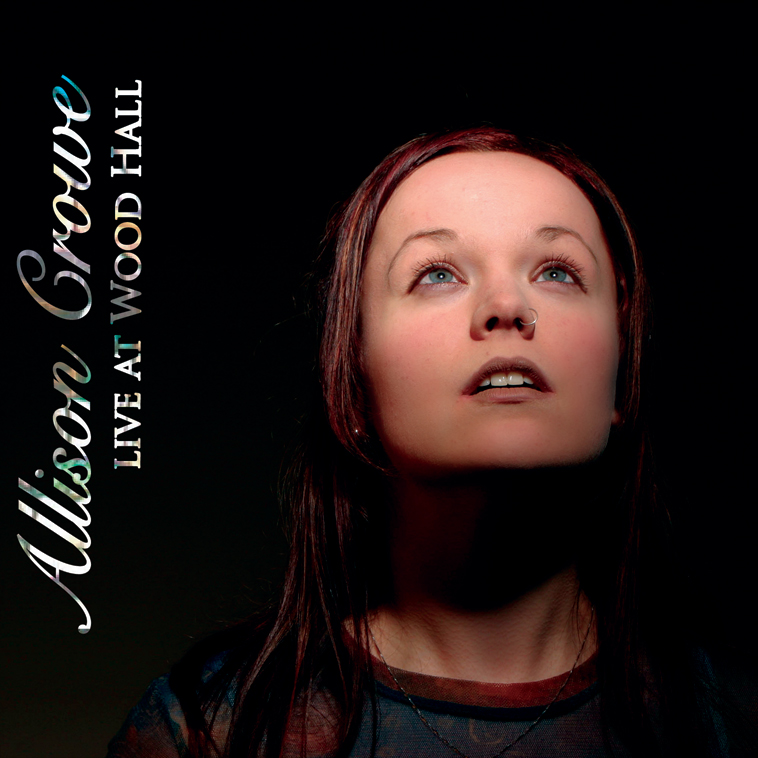

Live album by Allison Crowe
- Released: July 1, 2005
- Recorded: March 24/25, 2005
- Genre: Rock
- Length: 105:27
- Label: Rubenesque Records Ltd.
- Producer: Larry Anschell

Allison Crowe chronology
Tidings (2004)	Live at Wood Hall (2005)	This Little Bird (2006)

Professional ratings
Review scores
Source	Rating
Delusions of Adequacy	link

Live at Wood Hall is the fourth album release from Canadian singer-songwriter Allison Crowe. This double-CD set was recorded over two nights of concerts in the converted church chapel of the Victoria Conservatory of Music in Victoria, British Columbia.

The concert repertoire captured on these discs encompasses a range of genres from roots & blues, through folk, pop/rock, jazz and Broadway. The album contains music from Crowe's concert repertoire, and was freshly recorded in the converted chapel of the Victoria Conservatory of Music. In addition to more than an album's worth of original songs, Allison covers some of her favourite artists of today (including Ani DiFranco's "Independence Day", Tori Amos' "Playboy Mommy", Counting Crows' "A Murder of One") and classic rock (John Lennon's "Imagine" and "Me and Bobby McGee", a song penned by Fred Foster and Kris Kristofferson and recorded most famously by Janis Joplin). She also gives a nod to Broadway with "Bill" (from Show Boat) and "I Dreamed a Dream" (from Les Misérables). Add in some jazz, "In Love in Vain", and a traditional Irish aire, "Believe Me, if All Those Endearing Young Charms", and the result is the sort of eclectic mix for which the artist is becoming known.

== Track listing ==
- Disc One
1. There Is (Allison Crowe) – 2:58
2. By Your Side (Allison Crowe) – 3:50
3. Immersed (Allison Crowe) – 4:04
4. "Independence Day" (Ani DiFranco) – 4:07
5. Sea of a Million Faces (Allison Crowe) – 2:48
6. Fire (Allison Crowe) – 3:42
7. What About You (Allison Crowe) – 4:54
8. "Bill" (Jerome Kern, P.G. Wodehouse, Oscar Hammerstein II) – 4:04
9. Whether I'm Wrong (Allison Crowe) – 5:06
10. "In Love In Vain" (Jerome Kern, Leo Robin) – 3:02
11. "A Murder of One" (Adam Duritz, David Bryson, Charles Gillingham, Matt Malley, Ben Mize, Dan Vickrey) – 7:07
12. "Believe Me If All Those Endearing Young Charms" (Traditional Aire ~ Words by Sir Thomas Moore) – 1:20
- Disc Two
1. Crayon and Ink (Allison Crowe) – 5:41
2. How Long (Allison Crowe) – 3:48
3. Running (Allison Crowe) – 4:58
4. Pray For Rain (Allison Crowe) – 4:20
5. "Playboy Mommy" (Tori Amos) – 3:12
6. Finally (Allison Crowe/Stephen Clevette) – 4:19
7. Disease (Allison Crowe) – 4:57
8. Secrets (Allison Crowe) – 6:27
9. I Dreamed a Dream (Alain Boublil, Claude-Michel Schönberg) – 3:49
10. "Imagine" (John Lennon) - 3:16
11. "Me and Bobby McGee" (Fred Foster & Kris Kristofferson) – 4:17

== Personnel ==
- Allison Crowe –vocals, piano

== Production ==
- Producer: Larry Anschell
- Engineer: Larry Anschell
- Cover photos: Billie Woods, Allison Crowe
- Art Direction: Alix Whitmire
