= Allison Crowe =

Canadian musician (born 1981)

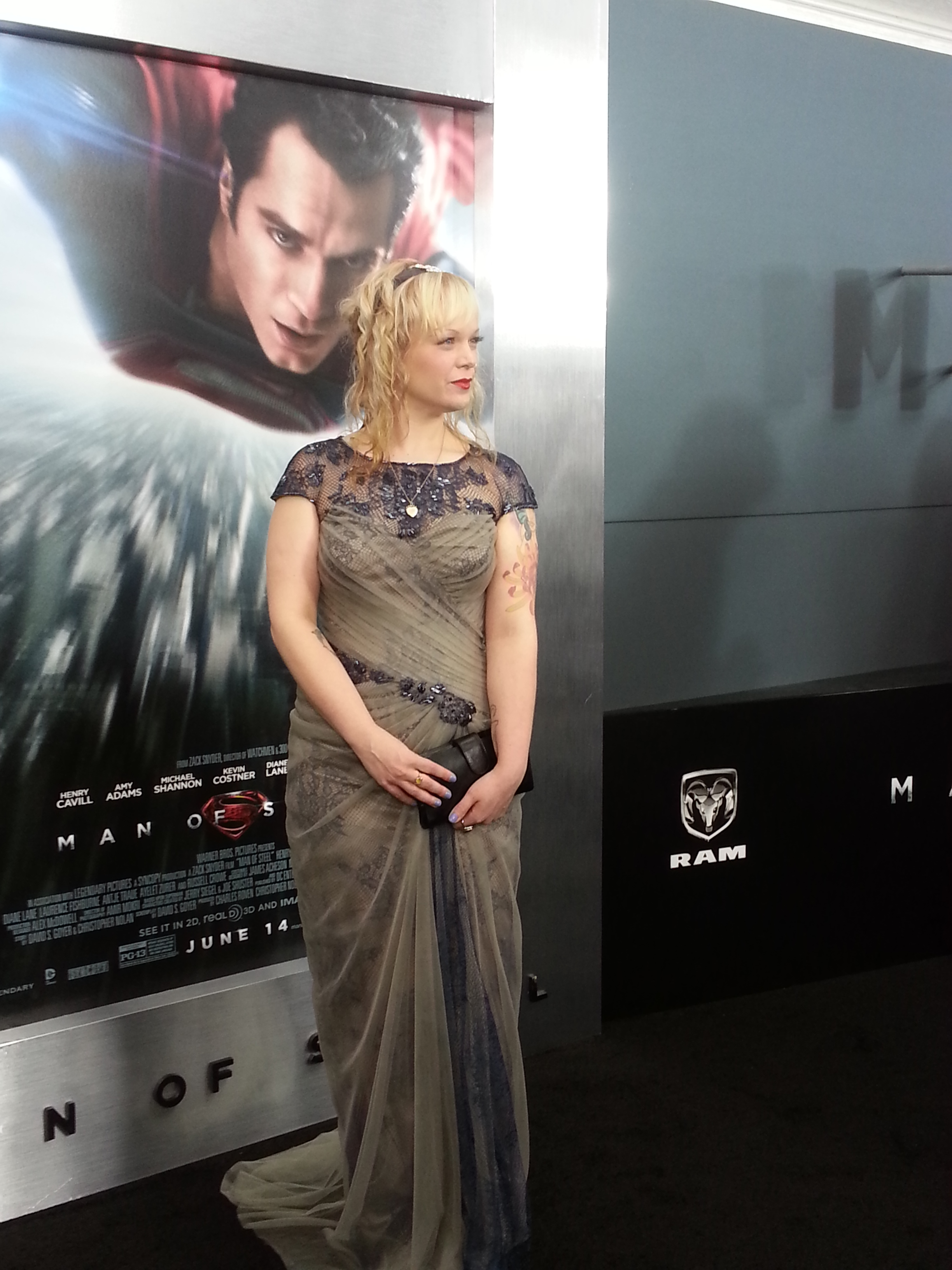
- Allison Crowe at the world premiere of Man of Steel in New York City

Background information
- Born: Allison Louise Crowe; November 16, 1981 (age 44); Nanaimo, British Columbia, Canada
- Genres: Rock, pop, folk, jazz, Canadiana, Celtic, showtunes
- Occupations: Singer, songwriter, musician
- Instruments: Vocals, piano, guitar
- Years active: 1996–present
- Label: Rubenesque
- Website: www.allisoncroweband.com

Allison Louise Crowe (born November 16, 1981) is a Canadian singer, songwriter, guitarist, and pianist born in Nanaimo, British Columbia, whose home is Corner Brook, Newfoundland and Labrador.

== Early life and career ==
Crowe began performing professionally in 1996 at the age of fifteen, doing regular sets in coffee-houses and bars of Vancouver Island. Her recording debut came in 2003 with the EP Lisa's Song + 6 Songs, the title track composed in memory of Crow's friend, Lisa Marie Young, the victim in a notorious missing persons case. Crowe's first full-length albums, Secrets and Tidings, were released in 2004. (Tidings was originally released in EP form in 2003.) Allison Crowe: Live at Wood Hall, a double concert album, was released in July 2005.

Of Scottish, Irish, and Manx descent, Crowe grew up surrounded by jazz, classical music, and rock. She discovered additional influences, such as Ani DiFranco, Pearl Jam, Tori Amos, and Counting Crows. On Amazon.com's downloads, she has simultaneously been in the top three on the Rock Singer-Songwriters, Hymns, Blues, Jazz, Broadway, and British & Celtic Folk charts.

She accompanies herself on guitar and the piano, on which she has been classically trained. She is largely a solo performer, though she has been part of bands as well, notably in a trio format as the Allison Crowe Band (2000 to 2003) and Allison Crowe + Band (2015 to date). Crowe mostly performs her own songs, which she has been quoted as saying vary among rock, jazz, and folk.

Crowe is also acclaimed for her interpretations of songs by a wide variety of composers, from Jerome Kern to Pearl Jam, including Lennon–McCartney and fellow Canadians Joni Mitchell and Leonard Cohen. Her version of Cohen's "Hallelujah" was named Record of the Week by Record of the Day (UK) in August 2004 and November 2005. In 2021, Hollywood film director Zack Snyder, a friend of Crowe, revealed that version would play during the end credits of Zack Snyder's Justice League, as an elegy to his late daughter Autumn Snyder.

== Recording ==
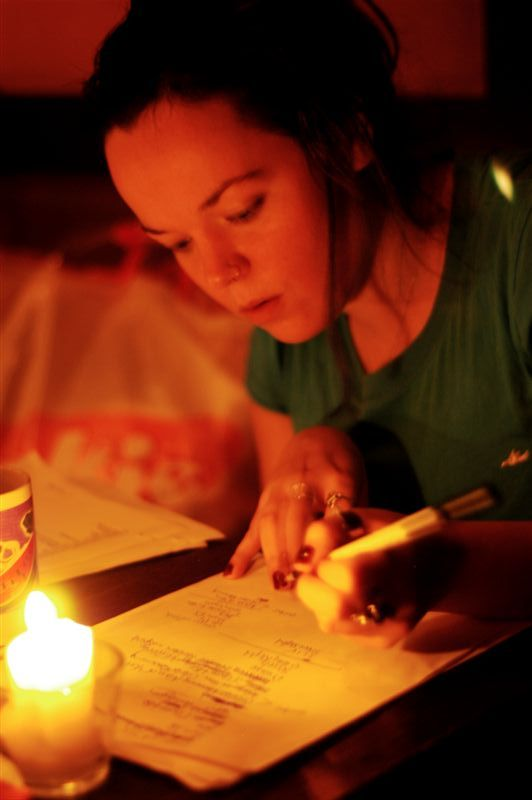
Munich, 2005

In October 2006, Crowe released This Little Bird, which she began recording in February 2006 in her new home of Corner Brook. The album was completed some 4600 kilometers west, on Vancouver Island, and Salt Spring Island, British Columbia. Following a string of successful concert performances in Germany, the Czech Republic, and Austria, she returned home to Canada and during the Summer of 2009 selected songs for a new album to be titled Spiral. Some of this collection comprises never-heard songs from Aquarius Rising (those for which orchestration was not found in 2007), along with new originals and cover songs. The resulting album Spiral was released March 17, 2010.

In July 2011, Crowe released a double-A-side single, featuring two songs: "Arthur", a piano original, "Up to the Mountain (MLK Song)", a guitar version of the Patty Griffin song. In December 2011, a holiday season concert in Vancouver was recorded before an audience that included cast and crew of the movie, Man of Steel. Following a concert tour with dates in Belgium, Germany, and Italy, on November 25, 2012, she released a live album, Tidings Concert, documenting an entire Tidings show in Vancouver.

Newfoundland Vinyl, a collection of songs from, or made popular in, Newfoundland and Labrador (and performed, engineered, and produced by Crowe) was released as a vinyl LP and in digital formats by Rubenesque Records on June 25, 2013. The album's songs were selected by Crowe from the stage show of the same name presented by Theatre Newfoundland and Labrador at the Gros Morne Theatre Festival.

Crowe released an album of new songs titled Heavy Graces on October 15, 2013. Songbook, a 22-track, career-spanning collection, (which received special-edition, limited release on June 14, 2013), was released globally on March 17, 2014. During September 2014, she released a series of music-movie mashups collectively titled 16 Songs. Souling, an album of traditional carols performed a cappella was released on November 2, 2014. On December 2, 2014, Crowe's Newfoundland Vinyl II album was released. As with the first volume of this title, curated from a theatre production for which the artist serves as musical director, this collection features songs created in Newfoundland and Labrador along with several folk songs that have traveled to Atlantic Canada from overseas.

Sylvan Hour was released on May 5, 2015. This album comprises songs recorded, solo, by Allison Crowe in a log-home located on Salt Spring Island, Canada. The thirteen tracks mix piano and guitar with vocals. In late 2015 she released a pair of albums: Newfoundland Vinyl 3 and Souling (Bonus Tracks Edition) - the latter being an expanded version of her 2014 album Souling. A band recording project completed in Winter 2015 was slated for release in 2016 as a double-CD set Introducing / Heirs & Grievances. This double-album was released digitally worldwide on March 22 and in physical, CD, format on May 22, 2016.

A live concert of Allison Crowe's quintet recorded at the LSPU (Longshoremen's Protective Union) Hall in St. John's, NL has been released (on April 3, 2018) as a pair of albums, Welcome to Us Acts 1 (guitar and fiddle songs) and 2 (piano songs). (This double, live, release evolved from plans for the song-track Rare Birds to be released on a single, studio, album.) Also in 2018, Crowe released a solo album, Newfoundland Vinyl IV.

Crowe's full band releases in 2020 are titled Pillars and Six More Songs.

== Touring ==
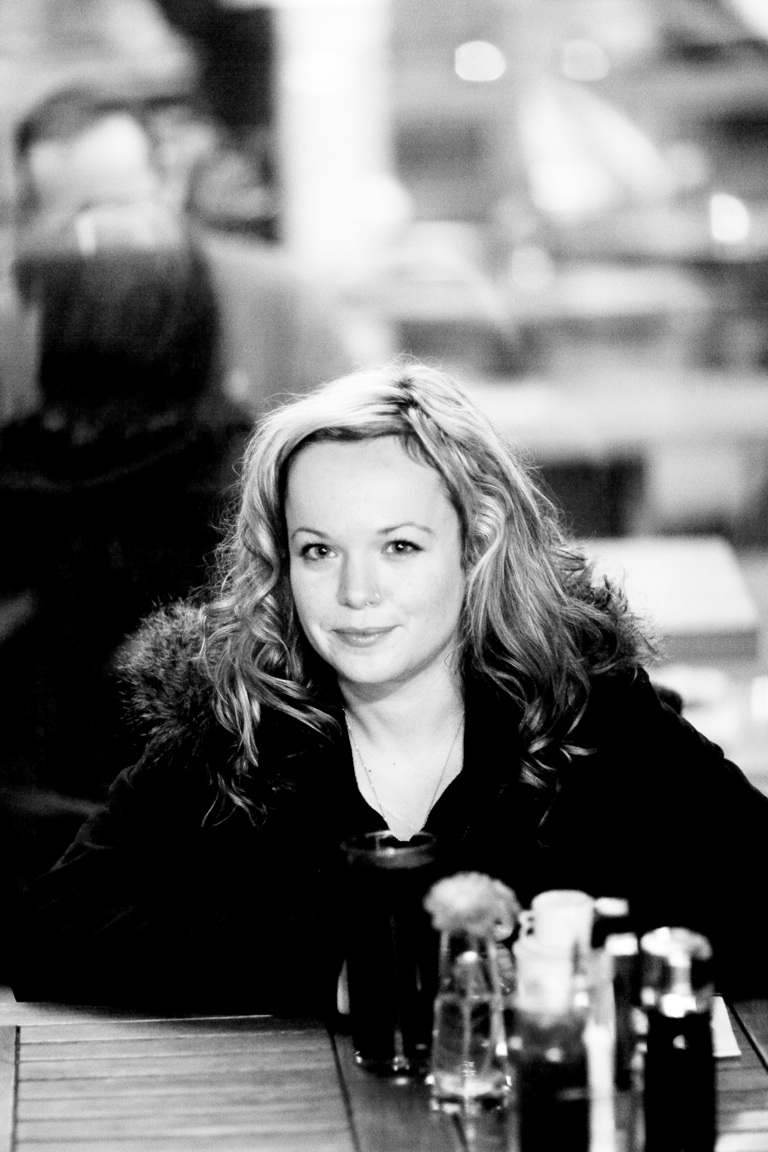
Allison Crowe at Jazzlokal Mampf, Frankfurt, Germany, October 2012

Crowe has toured across Canada and in the northeastern United States as a headliner. Crowe's touring band, her first since 2003, comprised Billie Woods on guitar, Dave Baird on bass, and Laurent Boucher on percussion. This quartet toured Canada's Pacific and Atlantic coasts, as well as continental Europe. In late 2005 she performed for the first time in western Europe, with concerts in Dublin, London, Munich, Frankfurt, Amsterdam, and Paris. In the spring of 2006, she toured coast-to-coast in her homeland, covering most of the distance by train on the Rock 'n' Rail Revue.

Following the release of This Little Bird, she visited England, Ireland, and Scotland on a concert tour. In 2007 her touring included a series of concerts across North America and a return to Europe where she performed at the John Lennon Northern Lights Festival in Durness, Scotland, on a bill with Sir Peter Maxwell Davies, the Queen's Master of Music, and Carol Ann Duffy, Britain's Poet Laureate. The event was crowned the "UK's Best New Festival".

In May 2009 she was prevented from performing in Edinburgh, Scotland, and London, England after being turned away by UK Border Agency officials at Gatwick Airport for lacking a Certificate of Sponsorship. Days later she resumed her tour in Germany.

In summer 2015 Allison Crowe formed a national and international touring band which now features: Céline Sawchuk (née Greb) on cello and vocals; Sarah White on mandolin, guitar, bouzouki, vocals; Dave Baird, bass, vocals; and Keelan Purchase on accordion, 12-string guitar, harmonica and vocals. Following concerts in western Canada, Crowe's quartet announced dates for a European tour in 2016 and these concerts in Germany, Slovenia, Italy, England and Belgium took place during April and May 2016. This band has continued touring North America through 2016 and 2017. N.A. concert dates for 2018 are anticipated to be followed by a return to European touring in 2019.

== Other work ==
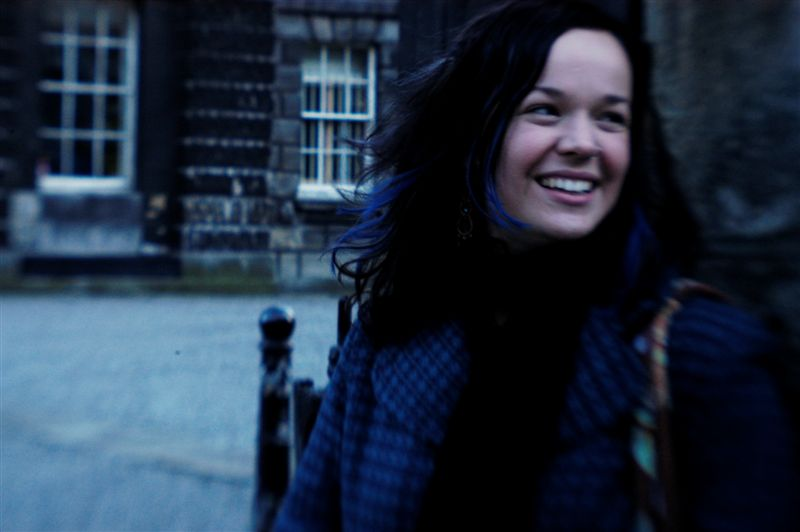
Crowe at Trinity College, Dublin, Ireland

Two one-hour television specials have been broadcast across Canada, with her Allison Crowe: Tidings special telecast each December since 2003.

In 2013, Crowe appeared in a cameo role as the "Singer at Cassidy's" in the major motion picture Man of Steel, a reboot of the Superman film series and the first installment in the DC Extended Universe, directed by Zack Snyder. In Man of Steel, she can be seen performing Johnny Cash's "Ring of Fire" and a recording of her singing Hallelujah was featured during the end credits of Zack Snyder's Justice League.

In May 2012 Crowe performed "Hallelujah" live with Canada's Royal Winnipeg Ballet (RWB) for the world premiere of The Doorway – Scenes from Leonard Cohen, created and choreographed by Jorden Morris with artistic direction by Andre Lewis. On the RWB's November 2012 tour of The Doorway, Crowe again performed on stage with the ballet company for "Hallelujah", "Sisters of Mercy, and "Bird on the Wire".

Her interpretations of Leonard Cohen's songs have received recognition in features by BBC Radio and MOJO magazine. Crowe's recording of "Hallelujah" was slated to be the soundtrack to a scene in the 2009 Hollywood movie Watchmen before being replaced by a Cohen recording.

"Whether I'm Wrong", an original song of social conscience written in early 2003, has been featured by the UNESCO-endorsed New Songs for Peace initiative.

After learning how the mainstream recording industry operates, inspired by the examples of Ani DiFranco and Loreena McKennitt, and Creative Commons licensing opening new avenues for musicians, she started her own record label, Rubenesque Records Ltd. The label was incorporated in 2001 and began operations with the release of an EP in 2003.

"Fluttering", an original book of poetry and prose is being written by Allison Crowe with publication announced for late 2018. The book's publication has since been rescheduled.

Crowe's duet with Richard Cheese of the song Viva Las Vegas plays throughout the title sequence of Army of the Dead, a zombie heist movie from director Zack Snyder released to theaters on May 14, 2021.

== Discography ==
=== Albums ===
- Lisa's Song + 6 Songs (2003)
- Tidings: 6 Songs for the Season (2003)
- Secrets (2004)
- Tidings (2004)
- Live at Wood Hall (2005)
- This Little Bird (2006)
- Little Light (2008)
- Spiral (2010)
- Tidings Concert (2012)
- Newfoundland Vinyl (2013)
- Heavy Graces (2013)
- Songbook (2013/14)
- Souling (2014)
- Newfoundland Vinyl II (2014)
- Sylvan Hour (2015)
- Newfoundland Vinyl 3 (2015)
- Introducing / Heirs + Grievances (2016)
- Great Island Wonder (2017)
- Welcome to Us Acts 1 and 2 (2018)
- A Time for Tidings (2018)
- Newfoundland Vinyl IV (2018)
- Six More Songs (2020)
- Pillars (2020)

=== Singles ===
- "Arthur" / "Up to the Mountain" (2011)
- "Snow" (2013)
- "Tarry Trousers" (2014)
- "(What's so Funny 'bout) Peace, Love and Understanding" (2017)
- "Tochter Zion" / "Stille Nacht (Silent Night)" feat. Céline Sawchuk (2018)
- "Pillars - Single" (2020)
- "All Your Favorite Bands" feat. Sarah Melanie White (2020)

=== Compilations ===
- Open Minds Open Windows: Songwriter's Stories (2003)
- It Was 40 Years Ago Today (2004)
- Christmas in Rock Vol. 4 (2005)
- Cohen Covered (2008)
- Songs of Hope for Haiti (2010)

=== Videos ===
- Inside Pandora's Box: Allison Crowe (2002)
- Allison Crowe: Tidings (2003)
- A Corner Brook Tidings (2012)
