= Glad Tidings =

Glad Tidings may refer to:

- Glad Tidings (magazine), a Christian magazine
- Glad Tidings (film), a 1953 British film directed by Wolf Rilla
- Glad Tidings (song), a 1970 song by Van Morrison
