= Vapor steam cleaner =

Type of cleaning appliance

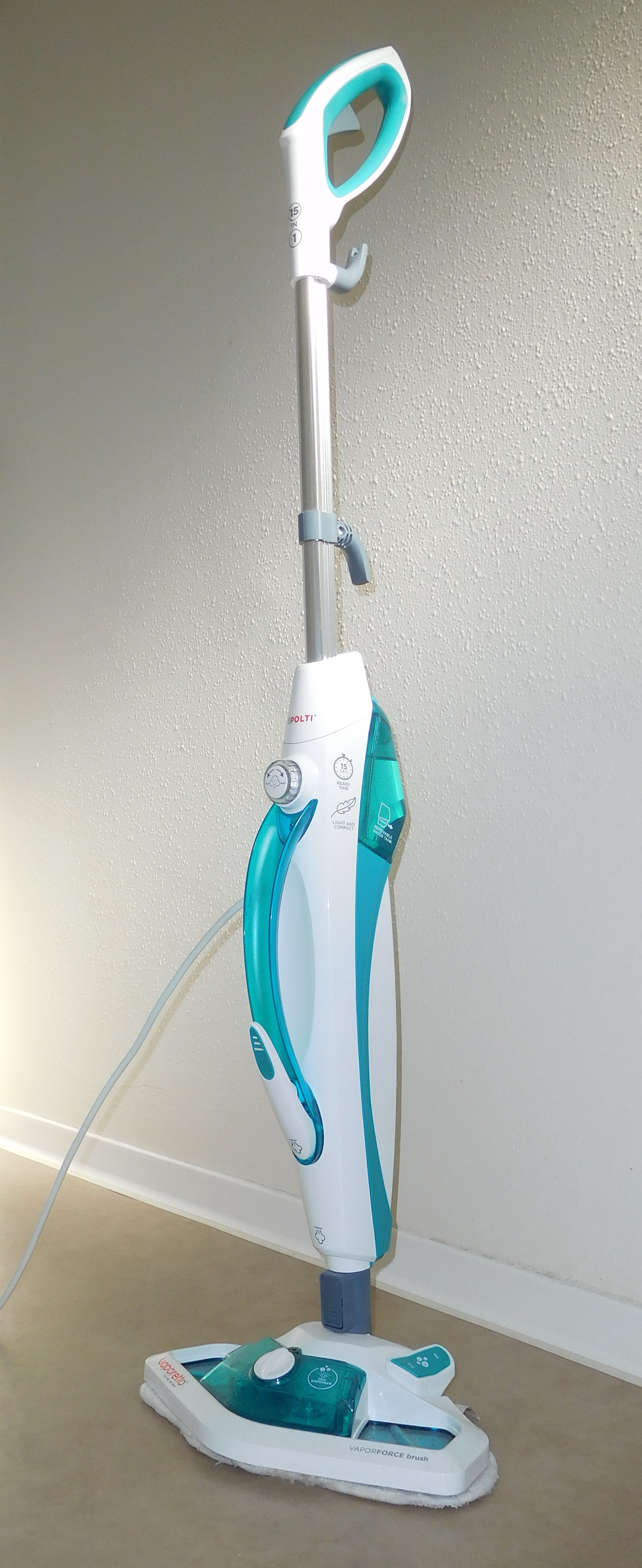
A portable steam cleaner Image source: Cjp24

Vapor steam cleaners or steam vapor systems are cleaning appliances or devices that use steam to dry, clean, and sanitize surfaces. The steam is produced in a boiler that heats tap water to high temperatures to produce low-pressure, low moisture water vapor.

== Operation ==
The steam cleaner's ability to clean is based primarily on its heat. The steam is applied to cleanable surfaces via a variety of insulated tools and accessories, releasing contaminants into water suspension, after which they can be removed by wiping or vacuuming.

== Advantages ==
Vapor steam cleaners typically consume less water compared to carpet cleaners or other cleaning devices, which use hot water instead of steam. They can also remove excess vapor from the air. A vapor steam cleaner can help to remove scents absorbed by materials.

== Applications ==
The low-moisture characteristics of vapor steam cleaners make them suitable for use inside buildings and residences.

Vapor steam cleaners are frequently used in hypoallergenic environments because they do not require the use of additional cleaning chemicals. Steam has been shown effective in combating mold, bacteria, viruses, and other forms of bio-contamination.

=== Steam mops ===
A steam mop is a mop that uses steam to clean floors and carpets. Unlike a regular mop, which requires cleaning agents such as bleach or detergent, a steam mop uses heat from steam to disinfect the floors. A microfibre pad is often placed right underneath the steam jet to trap dirt. Most steam mops have a small water tank, and often provide dry steam. The steam mop was first envisioned by Romi Haan in 1998 in South Korea. She developed a prototype in 2001 and in 2004 the steam mop would hit the mass-market. A steam mop works by heating up the water inside the reservoir to temperatures of about 120 degrees Celsius (248 degrees Fahrenheit). Many steam mops have one jet of dry steam (but may have as many as 15 jets), moistening a microfibre pad placed underneath. The steam helps soak the pad and dirt is drawn off ground. Unlike regular mops, steam mops do not leave a residue on the floor and often clean through the dirt. The heat of the steam can kill about 99 percent of the bacteria and dust mites. Steam mops can disinfect floors, restore shine, kill dust mites, and remove some stains. Some feature a two-sided, flip mop head that allows you to clean twice as much floor before changing the mop pad. One pad is soft for use on delicate flooring such as hardwood and laminates. The other pad has built-in scrubbing strips that facilitate cleaning tough messes.

== Manufacturers ==
There are several manufacturers of vapor steam cleaners, with products ranging from higher-end industrial products to inexpensive consumer models.

== Sterilization testing ==
Vapor steam cleaners are cited as examples of green cleaning because of their ability to kill germs and in some cases disinfect without the use of chemical disinfectants. Steam vapor has also been cited as effective in killing dust mites in carpet, bedding, and upholstery. Additionally, dry steam vapor has shown to be effective in killing bed bugs and their eggs when reaching temperatures of 150–170 degrees.

In 2005, the University of Washington tested a steam vapor system in restrooms and reported labor savings and hygienic improvements over previous methods.

== See also ==
- Hot water extraction
- Steam cleaning
