= Little Light (album) =

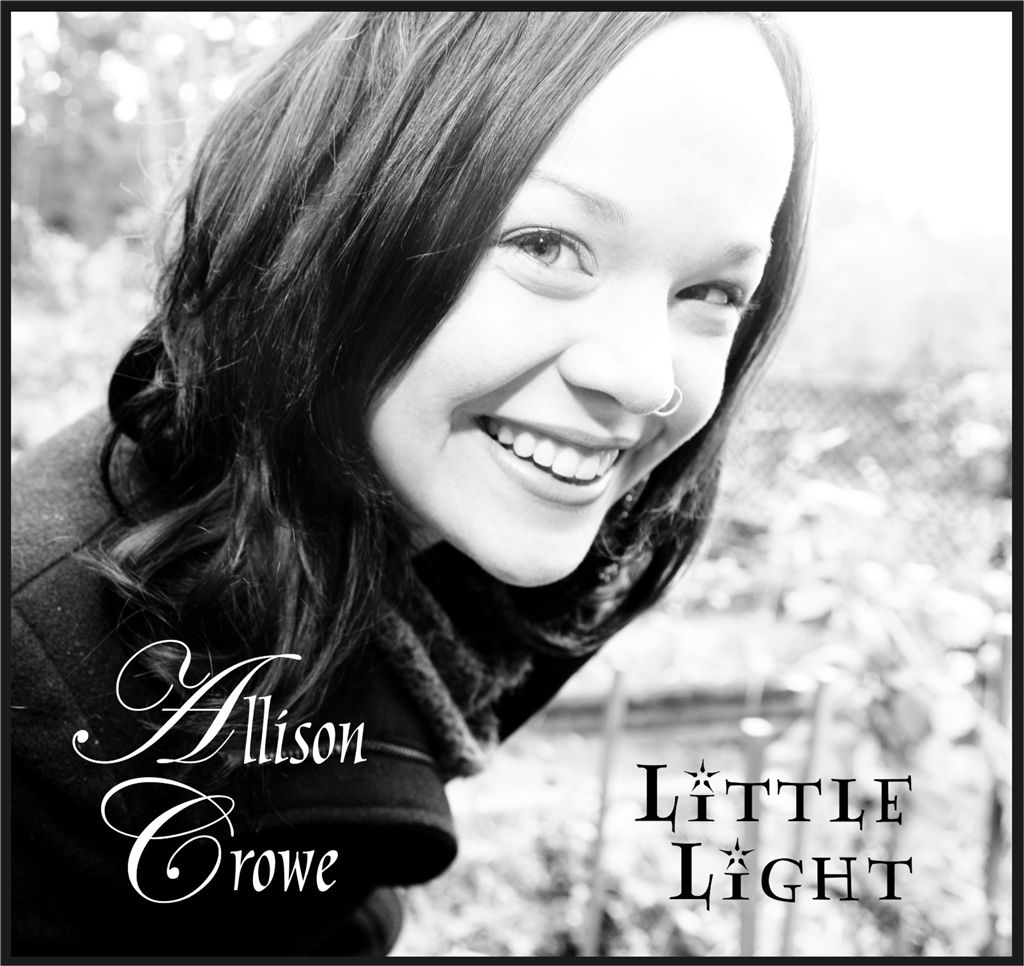

Studio album by Allison Crowe
- Released: May 2, 2008
- Recorded: 2007–2008
- Genre: Rock
- Length: 48:00
- Label: Rubenesque Records Ltd.
- Producer: Allison Crowe, Larry Anschell, Scott Littlejohn

Allison Crowe chronology
This Little Bird (2006)	Little Light (2008)	Spiral (2010)

Little Light is the fifth studio album from Canadian singer-songwriter Allison Crowe and the sixth CD release overall from her record label, Rubenesque Records Ltd. As on her previous album, "This Little Bird", the independent musician recorded the songs live-off-the-floor, and in concert, at locations spanning the breadth of Canada - from Corner Brook, Newfoundland on the Atlantic coast, to White Rock and Nanaimo, British Columbia on the Pacific shores. The album was released on May 2, 2008.

This acoustic collection consists of eight original songs along with cover versions of: Cyndi Lauper's Time After Time; Matthew Good Band's Running for Home; and Phil Ochs' When I'm Gone.

On Little Light, Allison Crowe, continues in her production roles - being sole Engineer and Producer for all but three of the album's songs.

== Track listing ==
1. Northern Lights (Allison Crowe) – 4:10
2. Angels (Allison Crowe) – 3:27
3. Disease (Allison Crowe) – 8:19
4. Time After Time (Cyndi Lauper, Rob Hyman) – 3:49
5. Little Light (Allison Crowe) – 4:49
6. Happy People (Allison Crowe) – 3:44
7. Hold Back (Allison Crowe) – 4:11
8. Choose to Be (Allison Crowe) – 3:26
9. Running for Home (Matthew Good, Dave Genn) – 4:01
10. When I'm Gone (Phil Ochs) – 2:57
11. Wedding Song (Allison Crowe) – 4:02

== Personnel ==
- Allison Crowe - vocals, piano, guitar - all songs
- Dave Baird - electric bass on "Angels"
- Laurent Boucher - percussion on "Angels"

== Production ==
- Producer: Allison Crowe
- Engineer: Allison Crowe
- Production and Engineering of "Angels" and "Time After Time": Scott Littlejohn
- Production and Engineering of "Disease": Larry Anschell
- Co-Engineering of "Disease": Brad Graham
- Cover photos: Billie Woods
- Art Direction: Adrian du Plessis
- Art Design: Christina Richard
