= Secrets (Allison Crowe album) =

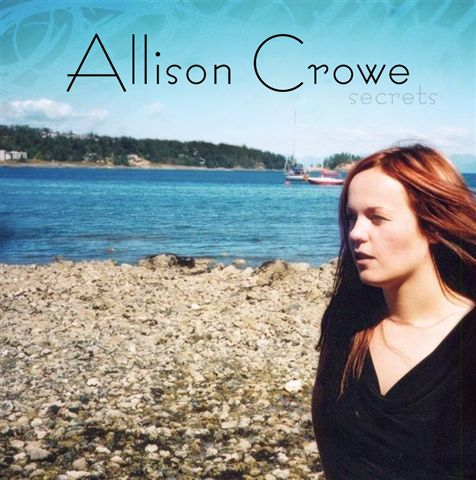

Studio album by Allison Crowe
- Released: May 5, 2004
- Recorded: 2004
- Genre: Rock
- Length: 53:07
- Label: Rubenesque Records Ltd.
- Producer: Rainer Willeke & Allison Crowe

Allison Crowe chronology
Lisa's Song+ 6 Songs (2003)	Secrets (2004)	Tidings (2004)

Professional ratings
Review scores
Source	Rating
Delusions Of Adequacy	(favorable)

Secrets, released in 2004 (see 2004 in music), is the second studio album released by Allison Crowe and her first full-length CD. Following the dissolution of her trio, Crowe recorded this solo, singer-songwriter collection in Nanaimo, British Columbia. She engineered the recording and assisted with production alongside Rainer Willeke of the Victoria, Canada-based rhythm and blues combo Soul Station. In addition to performing all vocals (lead and harmonies), piano and keyboards on the album, Crowe added acoustic guitar tracks and percussive 'thumps'.

Secrets contains 'old' fan favourites (some of which are radically redefined from earlier performances), newly penned songs, and a pair of personal picks from other artists: Counting Crows' "Raining in Baltimore" (the first song performed by Crowe when she launched her career as a singer-songwriter in the mid-1990s), and "Joan of Arc" (a poem song from the pen of Leonard Cohen).

== Track listing ==
1. How Long (Allison Crowe) – 3:53
2. “Raining In Baltimore” (Adam Duritz, Steve Bowman, David Bryson, Charlie Gillingham, Dave Immergluck & Matt Malley) – 4:50
3. Philosophy (Allison Crowe) – 5:24
4. Midnight (Allison Crowe) – 3:53
5. Immersed (Allison Crowe) – 4:15
6. Secrets (That Aren't My Own) (Allison Crowe) – 6:22
7. Montreal (Allison Crowe) – 4:26
8. Sea of a Million Faces (Allison Crowe) – 3:12
9. What About You (Allison Crowe) – 3:52
10. "Joan of Arc" (Leonard Cohen) – 4:51
11. Whether I'm Wrong (live) (Allison Crowe) – 4:44
12. Believe Me, if All Those Endearing Young Charms (Traditional Irish air; words by Sir Thomas Moore) – 1:28

== Personnel ==
- Allison Crowe – vocals, piano, guitar
- Del Crowe – guitar
- Jo Lundstrom – accordion
- Eric Reiswig – uilleann pipes
- Rainer Willeke – tambourine

== Production ==
- Production: Rainer Willeke & Allison Crowe
- Engineer: Allison Crowe & Rainer Willeke
- Art Direction: Alix Whitmire
