= Lisa R. Young =

American nutritionist and academic

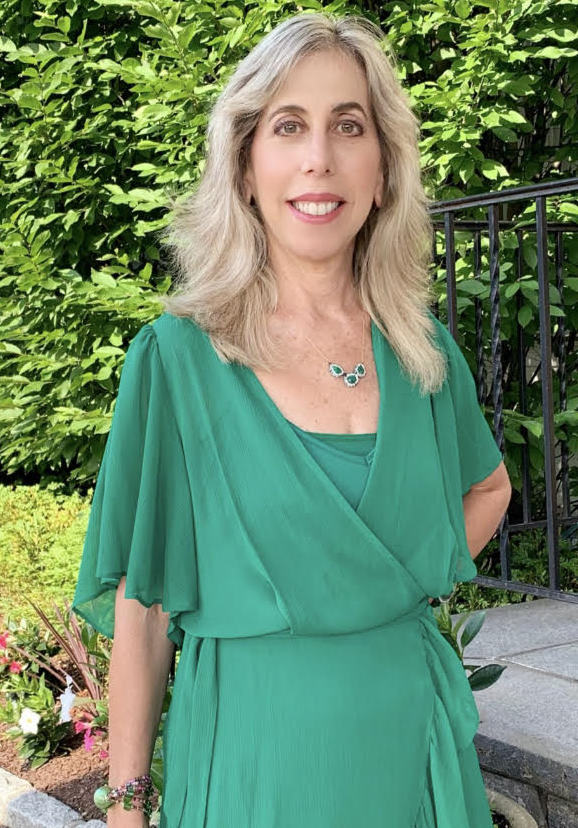
- Education: Wharton School of the University of Pennsylvania; New York University
- Occupations: Nutritionist, Professor, Author
- Known for: portion control advocacy and tracking the history of US portion sizes
- Notable work: The Portion Teller; Finally Full, Finally Slim

Lisa R. Young is an American registered dietitian nutritionist and author. Her published books include The Portion Teller, The Portion Teller Plan, and Finally Full, Finally Slim and has also published academic articles on the contribution of US portion sizes to the obesity epidemic. She also appeared in the documentary movie Super Size Me.

== Biography ==
Young obtained her Bachelor of Science in Economics and Health Care Administration from the Wharton School of the University of Pennsylvania and her Master's Degree and Ph.D. in Nutrition from New York University She is an Adjunct Professor in the Department of Nutrition and Food Studies at New York University.

Young is a Registered Dietitian Nutritionist (RDN). She counsels clients on nutrition and health and lectures internationally on portion control and nutrition.

She served as an advisor to the New York City Department of Health and Mental Hygiene on various portion control initiatives.

Young maintains a blog on portion sizes and other nutrition related matters. She is a contributing writer for U.S. News & World Report. She is on the Medical Review Board of Eat This, Not That!.

Young is an advocate for portion control. Her 2000 Ph.D. dissertation, on which she was advised by Marion Nestle, demonstrated how portion sizes of restaurant meals and packaged foods have increased over the years, contributing to the US obesity epidemic. She followed that up with articles in peer-review journals that updated the data in her dissertation. Her books The Portion Teller, The Portion Teller Plan, and Finally Full, Finally Slim: 30 Days to Permanent Weight loss One Portion at a Time provide advice on managing portion sizes in one's life.

== Selected publications ==
- The Portion Teller: Smartsize Your Way to Permanent Weight Loss (Harmony Books, imprint of Crown Publishing Group, 2005) ISBN 0-7679-2068-6
- The Portion Teller Plan (Harmony Books, imprint of Crown Publishing Group, 2014) ISBN 978-0-7679-2079-7
- Finally Full, Finally Slim (Center Street, 2019) ISBN 978-1-4789-9302-5

=== Journal articles ===
- Portion Sizes of Ultra-Processed Foods in the United States, 2002 to 2021 in the American Journal of Public Health
- Reducing Portion Sizes to Prevent Obesity in the American Journal of Preventive Medicine
- The Contribution of Expanding Portion Sizes to the US Obesity Epidemic in the American Journal of Public Health

== Awards ==
The Israel Cancer Research Fund (ICRF) gave Young an award as a "Woman of Action".
