= Carpet cleaning =

Process of removing dirt and stains from carpets

Carpet cleaning is performed to remove stains, dirt, debris, and allergens from carpets. Common methods include hot water extraction, dry-cleaning, and vacuuming.

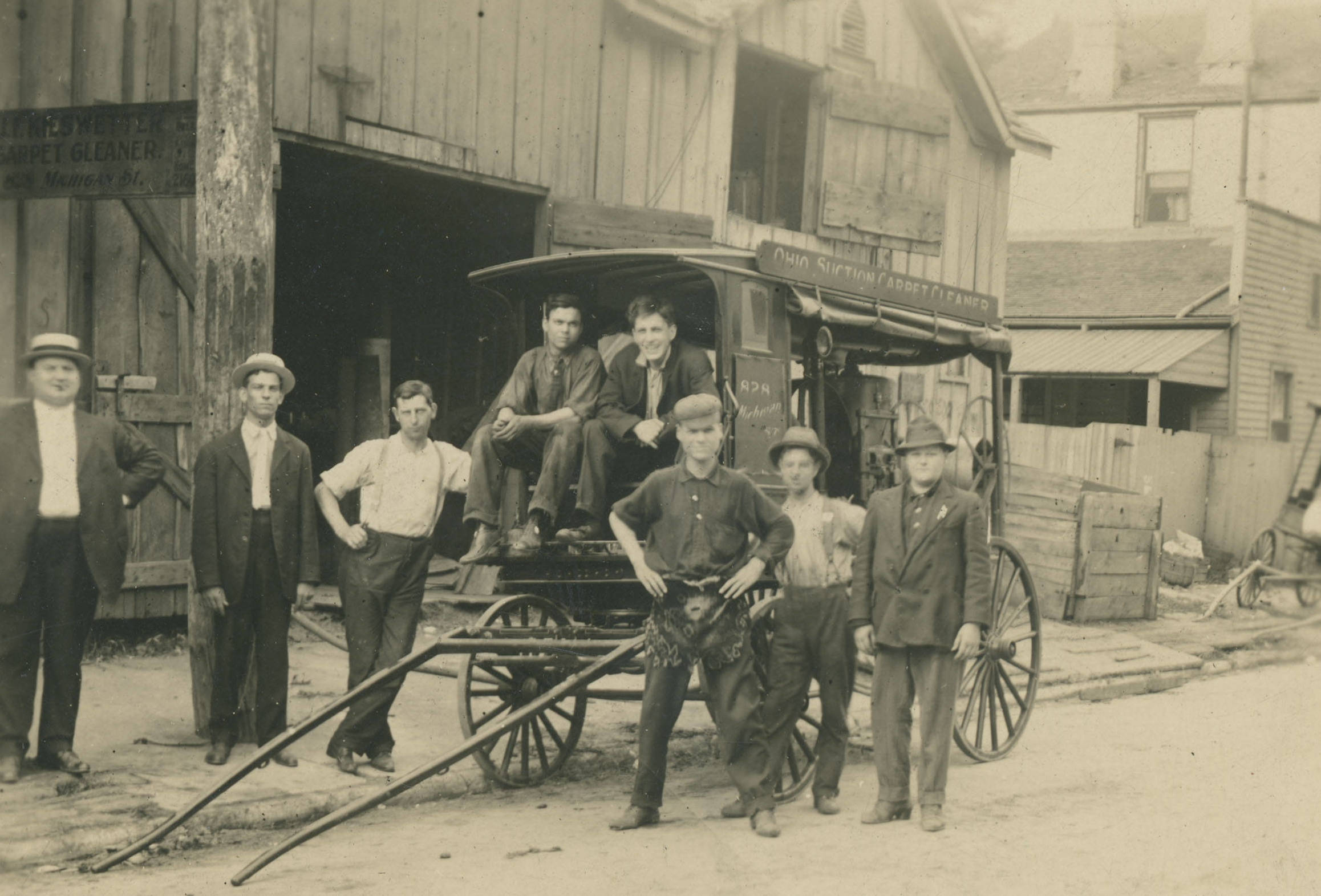
Ohio Suction Carpet Cleaner cart and crew, Toledo, Ohio

== Hot water extraction ==
Hot water extraction, sometimes mistakenly called "steam cleaning", uses equipment that sprays hot water and detergent into the carpet and extracts it along with any dislodged and dissolved dirt. For a brief period in the 1970s, hot water extraction practices then known as steam cleaning were heavily decried in the United States due to lobbying by dry foam cleaners to the Better Business Bureaus of various states.

Hot water extraction equipment may be a portable electrical units, or for large jobs truck mount carpet cleaner with long hoses may be used as this may be faster and more effective than portable equipment.

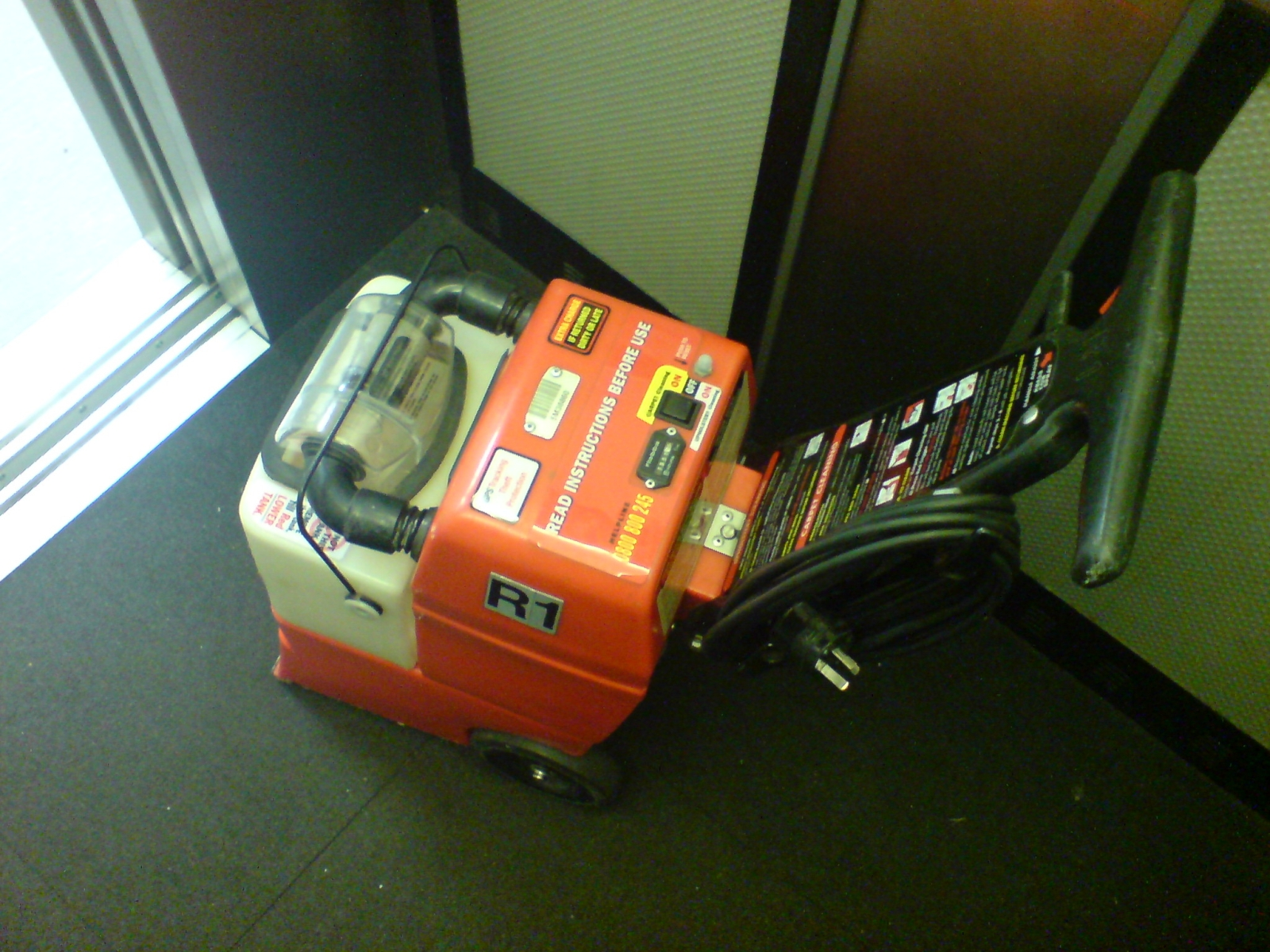
A Rug Doctor rental carpet cleaning machine

A common process of hot water extraction begins with preconditioning. Alkaline agents such as ammonia solution for synthetic carpets, or mild acidic solutions such as dilute acetic acid for woollen carpets, are sprayed into the carpet, then agitated with a grooming brush or an automatic scrubbing machine. Next, a pressurized manual or automatic cleaning tool known as a wand passes over the surface to rinse out all pre-conditioner, residue, and particulates. If an alkaline detergent is used on a woollen carpet, a mild acetic acid solution will neutralize the alkaline residues and restore neutral fiber pH.

Thorough extraction is important to avoid problems such as mold growth and browning of wool. Carpet cleaning specialists try to find a balance between rapid drying (using less fluid) and the need to remove the most soil (using more fluid). Drying time may also be decreased by fans, de-humidifiers or simply opening windows.

== Dry-cleaning ==
Many dry carpet-cleaning systems rely on specialized machines. These systems are mostly "very low moisture" (VLM) systems, relying on dry compounds complemented by application cleaning solutions, and are growing significantly in market share due in part to their very rapid drying time, a significant factor for 24-hour commercial installations. Dry-cleaning and "very low moisture" systems are also often faster and less labor-intensive than wet-extraction systems.

Heavily soiled areas require the application of manual spotting, pretreatments, preconditioners, and/or "traffic-lane cleaners", (commonly sprayed onto carpet prior to the primary use of the dry-cleaning system) which are detergents or emulsifiers which break the binding of different soils to carpet fibers over a short period of time. For example, one chemical may dissolve the greasy films that bind soils to the carpet, and thus prevent effective soil removal through vacuuming. The solution may add a solvent like d-limonene, petroleum byproducts, glycol ethers, or butyl agents. The amount of time the pretreatment dwells in the carpet should be less than 15 minutes, due to the thorough carpet brushing common to these "very low moisture" systems, which provides added agitation to ensure the pretreatment works fully through the carpet. The benefit of dry carpet cleaning, over wet solutions, is that dry chemical compounds do not attract dirt, like dried shampoo. While dry carpet cleaning is more expensive and more time-consuming to clean than bonnet or extraction, dry cleaning formulas put less stress on the carpets themselves.

=== Dry compound ===
A 98% biodegradable or other, slightly moist absorbent cleaning compound may be spread evenly over carpet and brushed or scrubbed in. For small areas, a household hand brush can work such a compound into carpet pile; working like "tiny sponges", the attracted cleaning solution dissolves dirt, and dirt and grime is attracted/absorbed to the compound. After a short drying time (the cleaning solution which is attracted to the compound must evaporate), it will be removed with a vacuum cleaner, the drier the better, leaving carpet immediately clean and dry. However, it is very difficult to remove all residues. The residues can cause allergies and biological compounds may cause discolourations on carpets. For commercial applications, a specially designed cylindrical counter-rotating brushing system is used, without a vacuum cleaner. Machine scrubbing is more typical, in that hand scrubbing generally cleans only the top third of carpet.

=== Encapsulation ===
In the 1990s, new polymers began literally encapsulating (crystallizing) soil particles into dry residues on contact. In the conventional cleaning process surfactant molecules attach themselves to oily soil particles, suspending them (emulsification) so that they can be easily rinsed away. Surfactant (detergent) molecules and emulsified soils which escape being rinsed away, remain in the fibre and continue to attract soiling. Encapsulators are specialty detergent polymers which become part of the detergent system. As drying occurs (20-30 min. drytime), after cleaning, these encapsulators bind the detergent molecules and residual soils in a brittle, crystalline structure. Detergent and soil particles can no longer attract other soils and are easily removed by dry vacuuming. In addition to binding the detergent and soil residues the encapsulation chemistry coats the clean fibre with the same brittle film. This reduces the fibre's affinity for oily and particulate soils. As this brittle film "breaks away" and more soil is removed, the appearance of the fibre improves as opposed to soiling more rapidly. Products which also employ fluorochemical technology, display dramatically extended anti re-soiling time periods.

Cleaning solution is applied by rotary machine, brush applicator, or compression sprayer. Dry residue is vacuumable immediately (20-30 min. drying time), either separately or from a built-in unit of the cleaning-system machine.

=== Bonnet ===
After a cleaning product is deposited onto the surface as mist, a round buffer or "bonnet" scrubs the mixture with a rotating motion. This industry machine resembles a floor buffer, with an absorbent spin or oscillating pad that attracts soil and is rinsed or replaced repeatedly. The bonnet method is not strictly dry-cleaning.

To reduce pile distortion, the absorbent bonnet should be kept well-lubricated with cleaning solution. It is not recommended to dunk the bonnet in a bucket of cleaning solution and then wring it out with a mop-bucket wringer, as this will make the bonnet too wet. It is important to change or turn the bonnet early, as bonnets can become filled with soil in just a few hundred square feet. Once loaded with soil, the bonnet will not hold any more; instead, it simply moves the soil from one area to another. An overly wet bonnet also deposits residues that attract soils when they are dry, creating the need to clean more often. It is recommended for robust and not for high floor carpet, it swirls the floor. It distorts pile and grinds dirt deeper in carpet fiber, and also has an abrasive effect.

When there is a large amount of foreign material in the carpet, extraction with a wet process may be needed. Normally, the spin-bonnet method may not be as capable of sanitizing carpet fibers due to the lack of hot water, for this a special thermo machine is needed, here the buffing machine is equipped with a heating, to heat up the bonnet, but a post-cleaning application of an antimicrobial agent is used to make up for this. A small amount of water is required with spin-bonnet carpet cleaning. It only cleans the top of the carpet 1/8 inch but it is very fast for wide areas. However, bonnet cleaning is not the best mechanism for completely removing the chemical that is pre-sprayed onto a carpet. It is recommended that only surfactant free or encapsulating products are used.

=== Shampoo ===
Wet shampoo cleaning with rotary machines, followed by thorough wet vacuuming, was widespread until about the 1970s, but industry perception of shampoo cleaning changed with the advent of encapsulation. Hot-water extraction, also regarded as preferable by all manufacturers, had not been introduced either. Wet shampoos were once formulated from coconut oil soaps; wet shampoo residues can be foamy or sticky, and steam cleaning often reveals dirt unextracted by shampoos. Since no rinse is performed, the powerful residue can continue to collect dirt after cleaning, leading to the misconception that carpet cleaning can lead to the carpet getting "dirtier faster" after the cleaning. The best method is truckmounted hot water extraction.

When wet-shampoo chemistry standards converted from coconut oil soaps to synthetic detergents as a base, the shampoos dried to a powder, and loosened dirt would attach to the powder components, requiring vacuuming by the consumer the day after cleaning.

=== Dry foam carpet cleaning ===
Dry foam cleaning involves applying a cleaning foam blanket to the surface area of a carpet immediately after a dry clean. The foam is left to stand for 10 minutes to allow chemical agents to affect the carpet. This method is typically used to remove grease from the surface; some foams have color brighteners, protectants and anti-soiling agents. It is not a completely dry method since the foam is 90% air and 10% liquid. A dry foam machine consists of a pressure tank in which a solution of water and shampoo is added. This method is used for water-sensitive carpets, needle felt, and other carpet types whose construction inhibits sufficient water extraction.

=== Vacuum washing ===
Vacuum washing employs a washhead that sprays water without detergent and immediately removes it by suction, creating a swirl of water. This ensures high cleaning performance, extracting the dirt from the carpet to a depth of half an inch. By immediately reabsorbing the wash water, the drying time is greatly shortened. This method is suitable for intermediate and basic cleaning. Because it does not require cleaning products, it leaves no detergent residue. Vacuum washing has long been in use in Europe, mostly in larger train and bus companies, schools, and historic preservation. The system works on all surfaces which are water resistant (carpet, upholstered furniture, wooden floors, stone, plastics). A great advantage is that this system works without brushes or pads so there is no abrasion on the pile.

== Household processes ==
Other household carpet-cleaning processes are much older than industry standardization, and have varying degrees of effectiveness as supplements to the more thorough cleaning methods accepted in the industry.

=== Vacuum ===
Vacuum cleaners use air pumps to create partial vacuums to suck up dust and dirt, usually from floors and carpets. Filtering systems or cyclones collect dirt for later disposal but do not necessarily improve the machines ability to remove dirt from the surface being cleaned. Modern carpet cleaning equipment use rotary vacuum heads and spray jets to deep clean the carpet through hundreds of multi-directional cleaning passes. Some add steam and agitation. Models include upright (dirty-air and clean-air), canister and backpack, wet-dry and pneumatic, and other varieties. Robotic vacuum cleaners have recently become available.

=== Stain removal ===
Tea leaves and cut grass were formerly common for floor cleaning, to collect dust from carpets, albeit with risks of stains. Ink was removed with lemon or with oxalic acid and hartshorn; oil with white bread or with pipe clay; grease fats with turpentine; ox gall and naphtha were also general cleaners. Ammonia and chloroform were recommended for acid discoloration. Benzine and alum were suggested for removing insects; diatomaceous earth and material similar to cat litter are still common for removing infestations. Candle wax is removed by placing a towel over the affected carpet area and applying steam from a clothes iron until the wax absorbs into the towel. Some traditional methods of stain removal remain successful and ecological. Caution should be used when treating natural fibers such as wool.

The longer the stain material remains in the carpet, the higher the chance of permanent color change, even if all the original stain material is removed. At times pets urinate on the carpet and this results in a bad odor especially when it is hot and humid. The carpet or rug is usually taken outside and immersed in water to remove such stains. Immediately blotting (not rubbing) the stain material as soon as possible will help reduce the chances of permanent color change. Artificial food coloring stains are generally considered permanent stains. These may be removed by professional cleaners or deep cleaning rental machines with heat-transfer stain-reducing chemicals, but carry risks of burning the carpet. Stain removal products can be combined with anti-allergen treatments to kill house dust mites.

=== Other ===
Carpet rods, rattan rugbeaters, carpet-beating machines, brooms, brushes, dustpans, and shaking and hanging were all carpet-cleaning methods of the 19th century; brooms particularly carry risks of wear.
