= Self-cleaning oven =

Oven that burns off leftovers

A self-cleaning or pyrolytic oven is an oven which uses high temperature (approximately 932 °F (500 °C)) to burn off leftovers from baking using pyrolysis, which uses no chemical agents. The oven can be powered by domestic (non-commercial) electricity or gas.

== Pyrolytic process ==
Self-cleaning pyrolytic ovens reduce food soiling to ash with exposure to temperature around 932 °F (500 °C). The oven walls are coated with heat- and acid-resistant porcelain enamel.

A self-cleaning oven is designed to stay locked until the high temperature process is completed. To prevent possible burn injuries, a mechanical interlock is used to keep the oven door locked and closed during and immediately after the high-temperature cleaning cycle, which lasts approximately three hours. Usually, the door can be opened after the temperature cools to approximately 600 °F (316 °C).

Self-cleaning ovens usually have more insulation than standard ovens to reduce the possibility of fire. The insulation also reduces the amount of energy needed for normal cooking.

Self-cleaning ovens are considered more convenient and time-saving, and therefore more cost-effective. However, because of the high temperatures, they produce smoke and require a high amount of energy. A typical 150-minute cycle will require more than 3 kWh of electricity. According to most professionals, the triggering of smoke alarms can be avoided by regular usage of the self-cleaning program.

== Alternative technologies ==
=== Catalytic cleaning ===
Catalytic "continuous clean" ovens rely on high-metal porous enamels to catalyze the reduction of oils to ash at normal cooking temperatures. The walls of catalytic self-cleaning ovens are coated with materials acting as oxidation catalysts, usually in the form of catalyst particles in a binder matrix. Cerium(IV) oxide is one of the common materials used. Other possibilities are copper, vanadium, bismuth, molybdenum, manganese, iron, nickel, tin, niobium, chromium, tungsten, rhenium, platinum, cobalt, and their oxides, either alone or in mixtures. Highly active coatings typically contain a copper oxide, manganese oxide or cobalt oxide, and copper and manganese oxides are often used together. The binder may be a fluoropolymer or an enamel frit. In the 1990s, SRI International performed a study for Whirlpool Corporation, and changed the composition and application of the porcelain enamel surface found in ovens to one with low ionic content, and a film that makes fat into water-soluble esters.

=== Steam cleaning ===
Another alternative to self cleaning ovens is steam cleaning ovens. It uses water with lower temperatures to clean the oven.

== See also ==
- List of cooking appliances
- Steam cleaning
