= Tidings (album) =

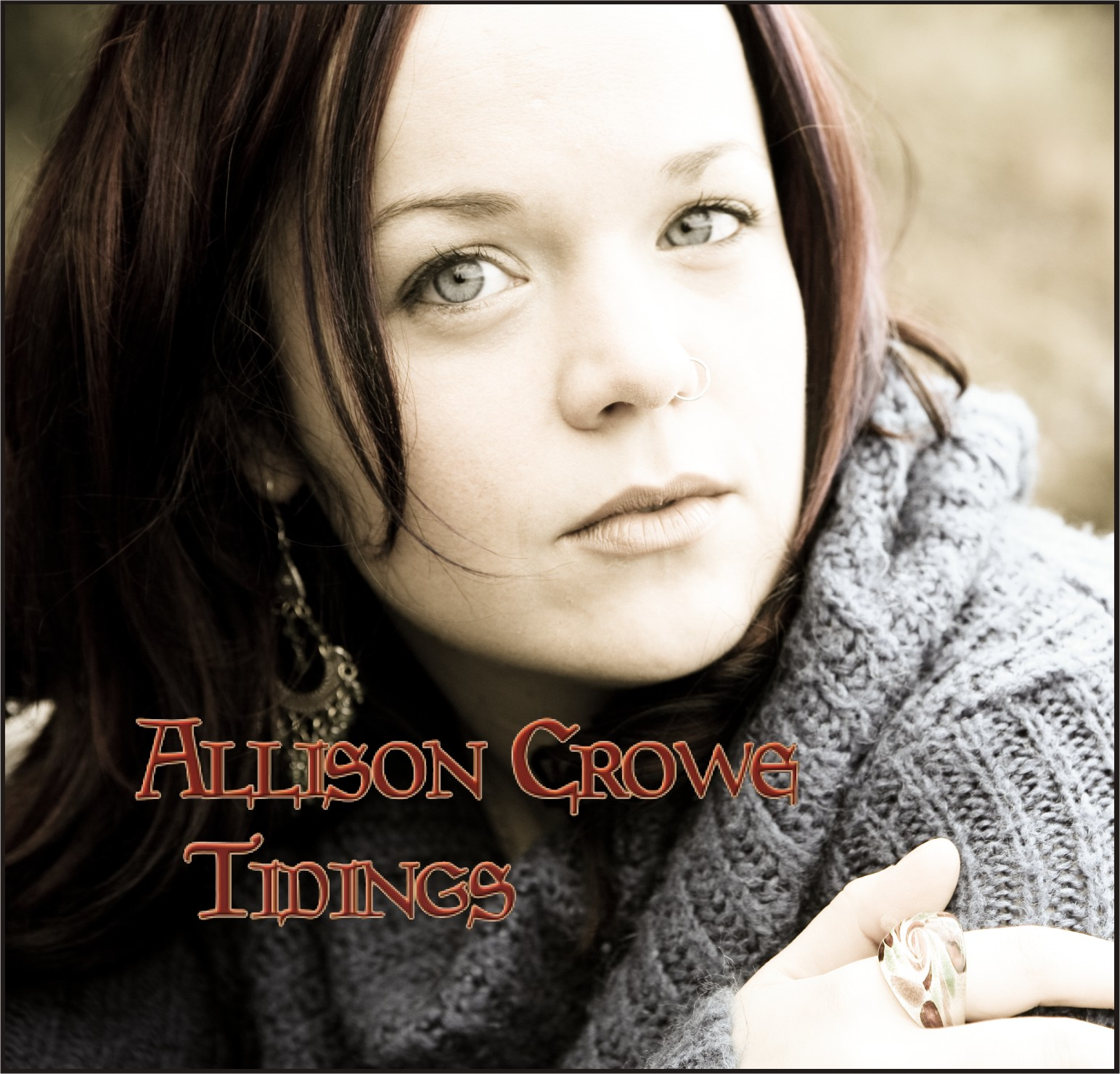

Studio album by Allison Crowe
- Released: November 11, 2004
- Recorded: 2003–2004
- Genre: Rock
- Length: 51:17
- Label: Rubenesque Records Ltd.
- Producer: Larry Anschell

Allison Crowe chronology
Lisa's Song+ 6 Songs (2003)	Tidings (2004)	Secrets (2004)

Alternative cover
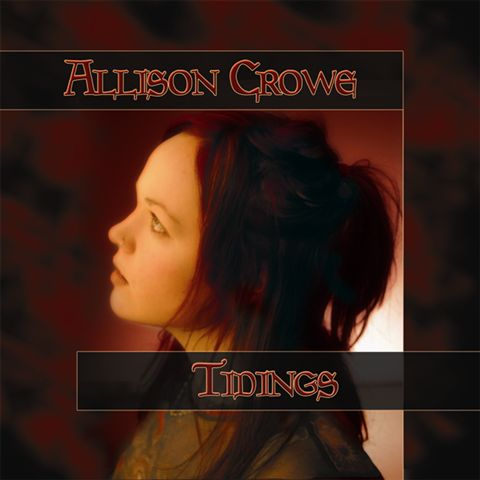
- Tidings album cover 2004–2008

Professional ratings
Review scores
Source	Rating
The Toronto Sun	4/4 stars

Tidings is the third studio album by Allison Crowe, released in 2003 in EP form and expanded to full-album length in 2004. Recorded live-off-the-floor, it is primarily an album of traditional songs of the season and Christmas carols alongside cover versions of some of Crowe's favourite songs of spirituality and redemption.

This collection includes several songs by fellow Canadian songwriters, along with international writers. Among these is a single/first take recording of Leonard Cohen's Hallelujah that is the best known of the artist's numerous acclaimed song interpretations. It has been commented upon extensively in print and broadcast media, including a November 2008 BBC radio documentary, "The Fourth, The Fifth, The Minor Fall".

Crowe's recording of Hallelujah was selected as the soundtrack accompaniment to a love scene in The Watchmen, before being replaced by Cohen's own live version. "I originally had a different version of 'Hallelujah' on that scene (involving characters Nite Owl and Silk Spectre II) - it was the version by Allison Crowe, and it was really beautiful. Too beautiful, as it turned out..." says the movie's Director Zack Snyder. In another interview, Snyder explained that Crowe's recording is "too romantic" and "too sexy" for the scene which is meant to come across as ironic and "ridiculous".

A DVD version of this album includes one original song written by Crowe, "Whether I'm Wrong".

Tidings is also the subtitle of a one-hour television special, featuring Allison Crowe in performance and interview, that has been broadcast across Canada each December since 2003.

== Track listing ==
1. "It Came Upon the Midnight Clear" (Words — Edmund H. Sears, Music — Richard Storrs Willis; Traditional ~ Arranged by A. Crowe) – 0:41
2. "River" (Joni Mitchell) – 4:11
3. "Hallelujah" (Leonard Cohen) – 4:33
4. "Silent Night" (Franz Gruber, Joseph Mohr ~ English translation by John Freeman Young. Arranged by A. Crowe) – 4:02
5. "In the Bleak Midwinter" (Words - Christina Rossetti, Music - Gustav Holst ~ Arranged by A. Crowe) – 5:31
6. "What Child Is This" (Words — William C. Dix, Music — Greensleeves, Music Origin Unknown; Traditional ~ Arranged by A. Crowe) – 4:04
7. "Let It Be" (John Lennon, Paul McCartney) – 3:07
8. "The First Noel" (Origin Unknown; Traditional ~ Arranged by A. Crowe) – 5:33
9. "In My Life" (Lennon, McCartney) – 3:02
10. "O Holy Night" (Placide Clappeau, Adolphe Adam ~ English translation by John Sullivan Dwight. Arranged by A. Crowe) – 4:16
11. "Shine a Light" (Mick Jagger, Keith Richards) – 3:51
12. "Angel" (Sarah McLachlan) – 5:26

== Personnel ==
- Allison Crowe – vocals, piano
- Dave Baird – acoustic bass, electric bass
- Kevin Clevette – drums
- Producer: Larry Anschell
- Engineer: Larry Anschell
- Cover photos: Billie Woods
- Art direction: Alix Whitmire
- Redesign: Christina Richard (2008)
