= Glad Tidings (magazine) =

Glad Tidings cover (2005)

Glad Tidings (full title: Glad Tidings of the Kingdom of God) is a free Bible magazine published monthly by the Christadelphians (brothers and sisters in Christ). The magazine was launched in 1884.

The stated aims of the magazine are:

- to encourage study of the Bible as God's inspired message to humankind;
- to call attention to the divine offer of forgiveness of sins through Jesus Christ;
- to warn people that soon Christ will return to earth as judge and ruler of God’s worldwide Kingdom.

In 2007, the magazine included articles such as A Closer Look at Bible Prophecy, Jews and Arabs to Find Lasting Peace and Three Steps to a Happier Life.
