= Steam cleaning =

Use of a jet of steam to remove dirt

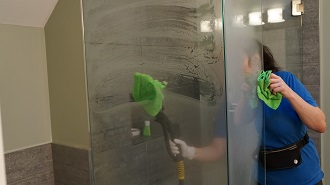
Steam cleaning

Steam cleaning involves using steam for cleaning. Its uses include domestic applications in cleaning flooring and household dirt removal, and industrial uses in removing grease and dirt from engines.

== Use ==
Steam cleaning is not suited for all materials, such as materials which are vapor-sensitive or sensitive for high temperatures. Some examples include silk, some types of plastic, leather, paper, wallpaper and water-based paint.

== Environmental friendliness ==
When used without soap, detergents, or other cleaning products, steam cleaning is an eco-friendly way of cleaning.

== Bacteria ==
Steam cleaning is effective in eliminating 99.9% of bacteria, and is considered a modern way to clean home air-conditioners.

== Use in self-cleaning ovens ==
In ovens, steam cleaning is an alternative to catalysis and pyrolysis for making a self-cleaning oven, and uses a lower temperature (approximately 100 °C) compared to catalysis (approx. 200 °C) and pyrolysis (approx. 500 °C).

Steam cleaning is widely used for deep cleaning surfaces using high-temperature steam, which helps loosen dirt, grease, and contaminants. The method is often associated with hot water extraction, a common carpet cleaning technique that injects hot water into fibres and extracts dirt using vacuum systems.

The high temperature of steam enables effective sanitization, helping to eliminate bacteria, dust mites, and allergens without the need for harsh chemicals.

Steam cleaning is commonly used in domestic and industrial applications, including carpet cleaning, floor maintenance, and equipment cleaning.

== See also ==
- Carpet cleaning – using "hot water extraction"
- Clothes steamer
- Steam mop
- Vapor steam cleaning
