= Beverley Jacobs =

Canadian activist (born 1965)

- Gowehgyuseh
- Born: 1965 (age 60–61); Six Nations of the Grand River Territory, Ontario, Canada
- Education: University of Windsor
- Occupation: Attorney
- Children: 1

Beverley K. Jacobs CM (born 1965) is a Kanienkehaka (Mohawk) community representative from the Six Nations of the Grand River Territory, Bear Clan. As an attorney, she became president of the Native Women's Association of Canada (NWAC), serving 2004-2009, and is best known for her work in advocating for the families of missing and murdered Indigenous women, and seeking changes to policing and the justice system to better serve Indigenous peoples. She is currently an assistant professor at the Faculty of Law, University of Windsor.

== Personal life ==
Beverley K. Jacobs (Gowehgyuseh) was born in 1965 into the Bear Clan of her mother, in the Mohawk Nation on the Six Nations of the Grand River Territory, in Southern Ontario. Her traditional name, Gowehgyuseh, means "She's visiting." She has a daughter.

== Education ==
After spending some time working as a legal secretary, Jacobs pursued a career as a lawyer. She juggled law school with the responsibilities of being a single mother. Often because she had no alternative, Jacobs brought her daughter Ashley, then eight, to class with her.

The only Aboriginal student in her first year at University of Windsor, Jacobs started the First Nations Law Students Society on campus. She graduated from University of Windsor in 1994, then obtained her master's degree in law from the University of Saskatchewan in 2000.

Jacobs has also completed a multi-disciplinary PhD in Law, Sociology and Aboriginal Health at the University of Calgary.

== Career ==
=== Bear Clan Consulting ===
After leaving university, Jacobs became a consultant, launching her firm Bear Clan Consulting. She advises clients on issues such as Bill C-31, Residential Schools, Matrimonial Real Property, and Aboriginal Women's health issues.

=== Amnesty International ===
Jacobs' consulting work led to a project at Amnesty International that changed the course of her life and career. In 2004 she wrote the Stolen Sisters Report, a document that exposed the racialized and sexualized violence suffered by Indigenous women in Canada, and the failure of law enforcement to protect them or to prosecute their attackers. It helped catalyze the founding of the Sisters in Spirit movement, which worked to push government, police, and media to pay attention to the growing number of missing and murdered Indigenous women in Canada, and the large number of unsolved cases.

=== Native Women's Association of Canada ===
In 2004 Jacobs entered the world of Indigenous politics, winning the election for President of the Native Women's Association of Canada (NWAC), largely on her work with families of missing and murdered aboriginal women. Jacobs was re-elected for a second term as President of NWAC in 2006.

As president of NWAC, Jacobs negotiated $10 million in funding from the federal government to support research into 500 of the missing and murdered Indigenous women to create a national registry, a hotline, and public education programs.

Vigils became a hallmark of the Sisters in Spirit movement. Families of the missing and murdered would gather with pictures of the missing women, sometimes lighting candles or releasing balloons all as a means of trying to attract media attention to their cause. Bridget Tolley, an Algonquin woman whose mother was killed by Quebec police in 2001, is credited with proposing the idea to NWAC as a media strategy. In her role as president, Jacobs attended the 2008 meeting at which Prime Minister Stephen Harper formally apologized to survivors for abuses under the residential school system.

Jacobs chose not to run in the 2009 election. Her pregnant cousin went missing in January 2008; her murdered body was found three months later. The perpetrator was prosecuted and convicted.

=== Families of Sisters in Spirit ===
After Jacobs left NWAC, the Conservative federal government, led by Stephen Harper, cancelled the Sisters in Spirit project. They said they would not fund any future projects if NWAC used the name Sisters in Spirit in any of its programming.

But families who had met through the Sister in Spirit campaign formed Facebook groups, and stayed in touch, and continued to hold vigils, forming a new social movement. In 2012 alone, 163 vigils were held across Canada. Families also began pushing for a National Inquiry into Missing and Murdered Women. The federal Conservative government refused to consider an inquiry. After they were unseated in 2015, the newly governing Liberal Party quickly announced they would hold an inquiry.

Jacobs continued to practice law on a part-time basis. She also completed an interdisciplinary PhD in Law, Sociology and Aboriginal Health at the University of Calgary, Alberta. She remained involved with the movement Families of Sisters in Spirit at the grassroots level, and joined the voices advocating for a national inquiry.

== Ending Violence Association of British Columbia ==
By 2014 Jacobs was working with the Ending Violence Association of British Columbia. This province has had a high rate of missing and murdered indigenous women. In June 2014 leaders of civil and aboriginal governments signed a Memorandum of Understanding (MOU) "to end all forms of violence against Aboriginal women and girls. It was signed by leaders from the provincial government, including Premier Christy Clark, and Aboriginal leadership across British Columbia, including the BC-AFN, the First Nations Summit and Metis Nation-BC."

The B.C. government had already committed $400,000 to the Giving Voice Initiative, intended to "help Aboriginal communities speak out and take action on the issue of domestic violence". In addition, the government released the Provincial Domestic Violence Plan in February 2014, attaching $5.5 million to a 3-year project to tackle this problem. It includes $2 million for programs for Aboriginal peoples affected by domestic violence.

== Awards and honours ==
- In October 2008, Jacobs was honored by Canadian Voice of Women for Peace, Canadian Department of Peace Initiative, and Civilian Peace Service Canada for furthering a culture of peace in Canada.
- In November 2008, she received the Governor General's Award in commemoration of the Persons Case, for her role in advancing women's equality.
- In May 2010, she received a Circle of Honour Esquao Award from the Institute for the Advancement of Aboriginal Women in Edmonton, Alberta.
- On December 1, 2016, she received a Franco-German Prize for Human Rights and the Rule of Law from the Governments of France and Germany for her human rights fight on issues relating to Missing and Murdered Indigenous women and girls in Canada.

== Video Links ==
- Beverley Jacobs at Government apology to former students of residential schools

Preceded by Terri Brown	President of the Native Women's Association of Canada; 2004 - 2009	Succeeded by Jeannette Corbiere Lavell
