= Indspire =

Nonprofit organization in Toronto, Canada

Indspire, formerly known as the National Aboriginal Achievement Foundation (NAAF), is a national Indigenous registered charity that invests in the education of Indigenous people for the long-term benefit of these individuals, their families and communities, and Canada.

== About ==
Indspire disburses financial awards, delivers programs and shares resources with the objective of increasing graduation rates for Indigenous students. Indspire serves First Nations, Inuit, and Métis students in remote communities, rural areas and urban centres across Canada.

On September 18, it was announced Mike DeGagne would replace Roberta Jamieson to become the president and CEO of Indspire. DeGagne formerly was the President of Yukon University and Nipissing University.

== Initiatives ==
=== Building Brighter Futures: Bursaries, Scholarships & Awards ===
Building Brighter Futures (BBF) is a financial assistance program for First Nations, Inuit and Métis students enrolled in an accredited post-secondary education or trades program across Canada. The types of financial assistance provided by the program are bursaries, scholarships, awards and incentives. And when Indigenous youth receive the financial support they need to complete their education, they thrive personally, they enrich their communities and they contribute to Canada's overall economic and social well-being. All Building Brighter Futures program donations are matched by the Government of Canada.

Outside the Canadian federal government, Indspire provides the largest post-secondary education funding through its BBF program. In 2018–19, Indspire awarded $16.3 million through 5,553 awards and scholarships to First Nations, Inuit and Métis students across Canada.

The BBF program has been in existence since 1985. Indspire originally provided funds primarily to students studying the fine arts. Today, through the BBF program, Indspire provides financial support to students in diverse areas of study, including trades, apprenticeships, science, technology, engineering, the arts and math.

=== Research Knowledge Nest ===
The Indspire Research Knowledge Nest is the first Indigenous research program of its kind developed in Canada. With data analysis skills rapidly becoming critical to economic success, the Research Nest is poised to seize this original opportunity to foster Indigenous engagement and leadership in quantitative research and data science roles.

The Research Nest team works with partners and collaborators to establish a training program that delivers mentorship and work experience to early career Indigenous researchers and data scientists. Its mission is twofold: to improve Indigenous educational attainment, labour market outcomes and community prosperity through groundbreaking Indigenous research; and to hire, train and support the next generation of Indigenous researchers. Through the Research Nest, Indigenous post-secondary students and recent graduates receive hands-on training to leverage Indspire's data holdings to answer pressing education and labour-market questions currently facing First Nations, Inuit and Métis (FNIM) communities.

== See also ==
- Indigenous Canadian personalities
- Aboriginal Day of Action
- Aboriginal Peoples Television Network
- Native Women's Association of Canada
