= Bertha Clark-Jones =

Canadian Cree-Métis activist (1922–2014)

Bertha Clark-Jones OC (née Houle; 6 November 1922 – 21 October 2014) was a Cree and Métis activist.

== Biography ==
Born in Clear Hills, Alberta as one of 14 children, Clark-Jones joined the Royal Canadian Air Force in 1940 and served as a drill instructor. Although she "never once felt any discrimination in the air force", she encountered discriminatory policies after being discharged, and was consequently unable to obtain land. She was forced to give up her daughter, the child of an Australian serviceman who had returned home at the war's end, for adoption. She would reunite with this daughter in the 1990s.

She married George Clark, with whom she began a small farm, and had six more children. The farmhouse was destroyed by fire in the 1960s and the family moved to Fort McMurray. Clark-Jones helped open an Indigenous Friendship Centre and volunteered with an education program. In 1968 she founded the Voice of Alberta Native Women's Society to advocate for Indigenous women's rights. This society eventually became the Native Women's Association of Canada; Clark-Jones was the first president of this organization in 1974. She also served on the Métis Judiciary. She was a member of the steering committee of the Institute for the Advancement of Aboriginal Women that published Our Women in Uniform: Honouring Aboriginal Women Veterans of Alberta in 2003.

Clark-Jones was the recipient of the Golden Jubilee Medal and the Diamond Jubilee Medal. She was named an Officer of the Order of Canada in 2007, and in the same year received the Lifetime Achievement Award of the National Aboriginal Achievement Foundation. She was buried in Athabasca Cemetery Field of Honour and is listed on the National Métis Veterans' Memorial Monument.
