= Dawn Memee Lavell-Harvard =

Canadian/Anishinaabe women's rights advocate

Dawn Memee Lavell-Harvard is a Canadian and Anishinaabe educator and advocate for Indigenous women's rights. She is Canada's first Indigenous Trudeau Scholar and has served as director of Trent University's First Peoples House of Learning since 2016.

She is best known for her role as president of the Native Women's Association of Canada from July 2015 to September 2016, during which time she successfully advocated for the launch of a National Inquiry on Missing and Murdered Indigenous Women and Girls. She also served as president the Ontario Native Women's Association from 2003 to 2021.

== Career ==
In 2003, Lavell-Harvard was elected president of the Ontario Native Women's Association in 2003 and served in this role for eighteen years before stepping down in 2021. In July 2015, she became president of the Native Women's Association of Canada, where she fulfilled her promise to see the National Inquiry on Missing and Murdered Indigenous Women and Girls implemented. Since 2016, Lavell-Harvard has served as director of the First Peoples House of Learning at Trent University in Peterborough, Ontario.

Lavell-Harvard has published several articles and books on the topic of Indigenous mothering practices and the impacts of colonization on Indigenous mothers. In 2003, she was the first Indigenous person to become a Trudeau Scholar. She received an honorary Doctor of Education from Nipissing University in 2016, and in 2018, she was awarded the Sovereign's Medal for Volunteers.

In 2025, she began working on a documentary film based on the work of her mother Jeannette Corbiere Lavell.

In October 2025, Lavell-Harvard testified before the Canadian Senate Standing Committee on Indigenous Peoples regarding Bill S-2, advocating for the end of the second-generation status cutoff in the Indian Act.

== Personal life ==
Lavell-Harvard is a member of Wiikwemkoong First Nation on Manitoulin Island. She is the daughter of Indigenous women's rights advocate Jeannette Corbiere Lavell and David Lavell. Lavell-Harvard and her husband have three daughters.

Lavell-Harvard studied education at Queen's University and the University of Western Ontario, focusing on the experiences of Indigenous women and girls in Canadian school systems.

== Published works ==
- “Until Our Hearts Are On the Ground": Aboriginal Mothering, Oppression, Resistance and Rebirth with Jeannette Corbiere Lavell (Demeter Press, 2006) ISBN 1550144618
- Mothers of the Nations: Indigenous Mothering as Global Resistance, Reclaiming and Recovery with Kim Anderson (Demeter Press, 2014) ISBN 9781927335451
- Forever Loved: Exposing the Hidden Crisis of Missing and Murdered Indigenous Women and Girls in Canada with Jennifer Brant (Demeter Press, 2016) ISBN 9781772580204
- Rematriating Justice: Honouring the Lives of Our Indigenous Sisters with Jennifer Brant (Demeter Press, 2024) ISBN 9781772585032
