= Sisters in Spirit =

Initiative by the Native Women's Association of Canada

The Sisters in Spirit initiative was a program led by the Native Women's Association of Canada (NWAC) and funded by Status of Women Canada. Beginning in 2005, the initiative was an effort to research and document the statistics of violence against Indigenous women in Canada. It also sought to heighten awareness and education regarding the treatment of Indigenous women, and ultimately influence policy to address these issues through documenting the lived experience of Indigenous women and highlighting the underlying causes of this violence.

== Background ==
Between 1978 and 2002, nearly seventy sex-trade workers disappeared from Vancouver’s Downtown Eastside, many of whom were Indigenous. During the 1990s, British Columbia’s Highway 16 became known as the "Highway of Tears" after more than thirty-two Indigenous women and girls had been reported either missing or dead.

Indigenous groups and organizations, including the families and friends of victims, increasingly began making public calls for action to address the issue of Missing and Murdered Indigenous Women and Girls in Canada. One of the organizations leading those calls was the NWAC.

The NWAC is a non-profit organization run by Indigenous women. It was established in 1974 to focus on sex discrimination resulting from the Indian Act and Indigenous women’s interests that were not being addressed by other Aboriginal organizations. In 2002, the NWAC submitted a report to the United Nations describing the devaluation of Indigenous women in Canada, noting cases where Indigenous women were victims of violence.

The report identified systemic oppression and economic marginalization of Indigenous communities, female members in particular, as causes for the violence. Such conditions were fostered and reinforced by government policies and indifference from police and society as a whole. As a result, Indigenous women are more likely to live in poverty and resort to working in the sex trade.

In October 2004, Amnesty International released "Stolen Sisters: A Human Rights Response to Discrimination and Violence Against Indigenous Women in Canada," a report created in partnership with NWAC. The document asserted that the Canadian government had not done enough to protect Indigenous women, estimating that more than 500 Indigenous women and girls were either missing or murdered over the previous twenty years.

=== Campaign/Initiative ===
In March 2004, the NWAC launched a one-year “Sisters in Spirit” campaign to not only draw more public attention to the issue of violence toward Indigenous women, but secure government funding for a multi-year project to study the problem. In 2005, the Canadian federal government announced it would provide funding for the research initiative, with five million dollars to be allocated from Status of Women Canada over five years.

The aims of Sisters in Spirit were to establish a reliable estimate of the total number of missing and murdered Indigenous women and girls in Canada, share some of the victim’s life stories, determine the root causes of the violence, and identify measures to increase the safety of Indigenous women.

In November 2008, Sisters in Spirit released its initial report, titled “Voices of Our Sisters in Spirit: A Report to Families and Communities,” followed by a second edition published in 2009. The methodology and framework utilized for the Sisters in Spirit research was a combination of quantitative statistical research analysis and qualitative “community based research framework” focusing on stories shared by victim’s families and friends. It also included community educational tool kits and safety measures for Indigenous women, and outreach support for victim’s families and communities.

The report included policy recommendations to implement culturally appropriate services for Indigenous female police officers, enhanced protection for the rights of sex trade workers, and education programs on the history and impact of colonialism and marginalization. Sisters in Spirit focused on policy recommendations for four key areas: Reduction of violence, increased accessible housing options, improved education and employment opportunities and access to justice.

In March 2010, Sisters in Spirit released a second report titled “What Their Stories Tell Us,” which further detailed the history and impact of colonization on Indigenous women and identified 582 women or girls had been missing or murdered in Canada.

When the initial five year funding allotment for Sisters in Spirit ended in 2010, the federal government opted not to allocate new funds to the project. As a result, the Sisters in Spirit research initiative "officially ended on 31 March 2010." In February 2011, the federal government reached a new funding agreement with the NWAC, providing just under two million dollars over three years for a new project called "Evidence to Action." Critics of the changes highlighted the funding shortfall and a watering down of the Sisters in Spirit initiative's breadth of work.

== Legacy ==
Despite the federal defunding of its research, the Sisters in Spirit project inspired numerous community-based events and offshoot groups that continue to champion its causes and support the families of victims. In addition to the annual events and vigils, the original purpose of the Sisters in Spirit research initiative has lived on by continuing to generate discussions and spur action on Indigenous issues. This has been greatly due to the partnership with the NWAC, through which resources have been established to promote education and awareness of Canada’s missing and murdered Indigenous women.

=== Sisters in Spirit Day ===
In 2019, October 4th was officially declared as Sisters in Spirit Day in Alberta by the provincial government.

=== Sisters in Spirit Vigils ===
Sisters in Spirit vigils are held annually every October 4th in the memory of Canada’s murdered and missing Indigenous women.

Sisters In Spirit Vigils raise public awareness about missing and murdered Aboriginal women and girls in Canada. Vigils ensure that everyone, regardless of their cultural background, is aware of this crisis of violence. They also support communities by showing women and girls are loved and missed terribly by their families.

The first Sisters In Spirit Vigil was organized by NWAC, Amnesty International Canada and KAIROS Canada. NWAC was surprised and encouraged when eleven Canadian communities embraced the concept and hosted simultaneous vigils, attracting hundreds of participants, on the same date: October 4, 2006.

The vigils are held by independent Indigenous groups.

=== Sisters in Spirit Walks ===
In addition to the vigils, a number of Sisters in Spirit events involve walks or marches on October 4, as well as during other notable times of the year, such as the Women's Memorial March on Valentine's Day and Winnipeg’s Mother’s Day Walk. Like the vigils, the marches serve to honour the memory of Indigenous women and promote solidarity among Indigenous community.

=== Families of Sisters in Spirit ===
The Families of Sisters in Spirit is a grassroots program founded by Bridget Tolley in 2011. It is funded through community donations and a handful of small fundraising events. Recognizing the lack of support for families of missing and murdered Indigenous women, the program is intended to provide them with a network of financial and emotional support while also increasing widespread awareness of the issue. Families of Sisters in Spirit pursues these goals through hosting events and discussions, establishing connections between communities, and offering direct support to Indigenous families. The program "is led by and for families of missing and murdered Indigenous women and girls."

== Artistic Expression ==
=== Quilting ===
Alice Olsen Williams, Anishinaabe quilter and advocate of the NWAC, wanted to create an artistic and therapeutic way for Indigenous peoples to express their anger and heartbreak over the injustice of missing and murdered Indigenous women and girls. Hoping to both increase awareness of the issue and begin a process of healing, Williams issued a “Call for Quilt Squares,” inviting quilters across the country to share their stories by creating their own unique squares. She would go on to collect the squares and patch them together, ultimately forming the “Sisters in Spirit Traveling Quilt.”

=== Poetry ===
In October 2016, the Wolastoqiyik Sisters in Spirit inaugurated an annual Poetry Slam in Fredericton, New Brunswick. Part of the group's "Days of Awareness," the event serves as an opportunity for poets to artistically express their thoughts and emotions about their fallen sisters.
