= Aboriginal Day of Action =

Day of organized protest by Canadian First Nations groups

The Aboriginal Day of Action (also known as the Aboriginal Day of Protest) was a day of organized protest and demonstration by Canadian First Nations groups on June 29, 2007. Events were held at sites across the country.

The event, now known as the Indigenous Day of Action, has become annual, with events being hosted nationwide every year on June 29 since 2007.

== Overview ==
The events included blockades of several major transportation routes, especially but not exclusively in Eastern Ontario, and protest rallies held in Toronto, Ottawa, Vancouver, Edmonton, Windsor and at the Nova Scotia-New Brunswick border. Blockaded routes included Highway 401 at Tyendinaga (as well as two potential detour routes south to Deseronto), the Via Rail Corridor line from Toronto to Montreal, the Mercier Bridge into Montreal, Highway 17 at McKerrow and Serpent River, the Huron Central Railway route from Sudbury to Sault Ste. Marie, and Muskoka Regional Road 38 at Bala.

The protests were organized to call attention to poverty, lack of governmental action on indigenous land claims issues, the quality of indigenous health and social service programs and the federal government's cancellation of the Kelowna Accord.

The events were closely co-ordinated with police.

== See also ==
- The Canadian Crown and First Nations, Inuit and Métis
