= Bridget Tolley =

Indigenous Canadian activist

- Born: 1960 (age 65–66); Maniwaki, Quebec, Canada
- Known for: Elder activist for Missing and Murdered Indigenous Women
- Parent(s): Gladys and John Tolley

Bridget Tolley (born 1960) is a Canada-based Algonquin community worker, activist for Missing and Murdered Indigenous Women (MMIW), and the founder of the grassroots activist and support organization, Families of Sisters in Spirit (FSIS).

== Early life and biography ==
Tolley was born in 1960 at Maniwaki, Quebec, to Gladys and John Tolley. She is an Algonquin grandmother and long-time activist. Her father committed suicide when she was 11 years old.

== Activism ==
Bridget Tolley's mother, Gladys Tolley, was struck and killed by a Sûreté du Québec (Quebec Provincial Police) cruiser near Maniwaki, Quebec, on the night of October 5, 2001. A year after her mother's death, Tolley discovered that the police had terminated the investigation into her mother’s death without informing her. Tolley began investigating her mother's death herself, and in the process became an activist for Missing and Murdered Indigenous Women.

Tolley is the founder of the MMIW organization, Families of Sisters in Spirit (FSIS).

FISIS is led by and for families of missing and murdered Indigenous women and girls, with support from a diversity of friends and allies. FSIS receives no government, agency or organizational funding. We operate entirely with support from the community, including volunteers, donations, and in-kind support (Tolley, Martin, & Gilchrist, 2012).

She is also a founding member of Justice for Victims of Police Killings and is involved with the Native Women's Association of Canada Sisters in Spirit Vigils. Tolley is active in other social issues such as child welfare, police violence, Indigenous education and housing.
