= Native Women's Association of Canada =

Canadian indigenous organization

- Abbreviation: NWAC
- Formation: 1974
- Type: National Aboriginal organization
- Purpose: Advocate and public voice, educator and network
- Headquarters: Ottawa, Ontario, Canada
- Region served: Canada
- Official language: English, French
- Website: www.nwac.ca

The Native Women's Association of Canada (NWAC; French: Association des femmes autochtones du Canada [AFAC]) is a national Indigenous organization representing the political voice of Indigenous women, girls, and gender-diverse people in Canada, inclusive of First Nations on and off reserve, status and non-status, disenfranchised, Métis, and Inuit. An aggregate of Indigenous women's organizations from across the country, NWAC was founded on the collective goal to enhance, promote, and foster the social, economic, cultural and political well-being of Indigenous women within their respective communities and Canadian societies.

Since 1974, NWAC has established governance structures, decision-making processes, financial policies and procedures, and networks. NWAC engages in national and international advocacy aimed at legislative and policy reforms that promote equality for Indigenous women, girls, Two-Spirit, and gender-diverse people, including LGBTQ+ people. Through advocacy, policy, and legislative analysis, NWAC works to preserve Indigenous culture and advance the well-being of all Indigenous women, girls, and gender-diverse people, as well as their families and communities.

NWAC works on a variety of issues such as employment, labour and business, health, violence prevention and safety, justice and human rights, environment, early learning childcare and international affairs.

== History ==
NWAC was founded in 1974 as an aggregate of 13 Aboriginal women's groups from coast to coast, with the goals of preserving Aboriginal culture, achieving equal opportunity for Aboriginal women, and having a role in shaping legislation relevant to Aboriginal women. NWAC is led by a president and board of directors, who cooperate and exchange information with local organizations.

Meanwhile, the board studies the actions of the president and its provincial/territorial member associations and makes recommendations.

In 1992, when the Charlottetown Accord was being negotiated, the federal government included four Aboriginal groups in negotiations and gave them money. NWAC, which was not included, alleged the four groups primarily represented Aboriginal men and launched a court challenge for representation, claiming to have been denied rights to freedom of expression under section 2 and sexual equality under section 28 of the Canadian Charter of Rights and Freedoms.

This claim is known as the case of Native Women's Association of Canada v Canada. It took place in 1994. NWAC reproached the federal government for not promoting gender equality. By being excluded from the Charlottetown Accord, NWAC has hence been excluded from constitutional negotiations. It maintained that the Aboriginal right to self-governance was not only the choice of the Aboriginal men but also the choice of Aboriginal women. Eventually, the Supreme Court of Canada supported the Federal Court and NWAC was excluded from the negotiations.

In 2004, the Women's Court of Canada, a group of feminist / equality 'Charter' activists, lawyers, and academics, reconsidered the case of Native Women's Association of Canada v Canada. The WCC remembered that Aboriginal women were historically equal in decisions. They also reproached the "patriarchal structure and discrimination" (reference: The Court) of the Canadian law. The Women's Court of Canada maintained that the federal government failed to include Aboriginal women in constitutional decisions, or at least Aboriginal women's interests. Because of this failure, the WCC announced that the federal government violated Aboriginal women's rights.

== Past presidents ==
- Bertha Clark-Jones served as the organization's first president, in 1974.
- In 2004 Beverley Jacobs was elected president. During her tenure she was best known for launching the Sisters in Spirit Campaign to raise awareness about the high number of missing and murdered Indigenous women in Canada. She was re-elected in 2006. Jacobs chose not to run in the 2009 election. Her own niece/cousin had been murdered in early 2008.
- In September 2009 Jeannette Corbiere Lavell was elected for a three-year period. As an activist for Indigenous people, she wants the recognition of the Aboriginal history, traditions and culture.
- In August 2012, Michèle Audette was elected for a three-year period. Being half-Native herself by her mother, Michèle Audette felt very soon concerned about Native women's rights. She is an activist for Native women's rights, especially engaged in violence against Indigenous women and poverty in Indigenous communities.
- In July 2015, Dawn Lavell-Harvard was elected for a three-year period in NWAC's former board of directors, was elected in Montreal, Québec. She decided to resign in September 2016 for family reasons. With a PhD in education, she has been advocating for Indigenous women in Canada since 1994. Before working at NWAC, she worked as president for the Ontario Native Women's Association (ONWA) for eleven years.
- Francyne Joe was elected in September 2016 for a three-year period. As former president of BC Native Women’s Association, she accessed funding for education and career development, advocated with families for a National Inquiry into Missing and Murdered Indigenous Women and Girls, and fostered partnerships with BC Aboriginal agencies to address issues pertaining to Indigenous peoples, their families, and their communities.
- Lorraine Whitman was elected president in September 2019. Prior to her presidency at NWAC, Lorraine was elected president of the Nova Scotia Native Women's Association in 2017. Outside of attending to her duties as NWAC's president, Lorraine splits her time between her career and speaking on Mi’kmaw culture in schools and at public events. She is an artisan and a volunteer in her church and at the local elementary school.

== Projects ==
=== Involvement for Missing and Murdered Indigenous Women and Girls ===
One of NWAC's main projects is to end violence against Indigenous women.

Events in the honour of Missing and Murdered Indigenous Women and Girls

NWAC participated in or created different events in the memory of Missing and Murdered Indigenous Women and Girls, such as:

- On October 4, 2006, the first candlelight Sisters in Spirit Vigils was held in Vancouver, British Columbia, to honor the memory of missing and murdered Indigenous women and girls. Since 2006, candlelights vigils have been organized every year on October 4.
- On March 31, 2010, NWAC created the "Knowledge to Action" Day. The name of the event speaks for itself since its main goal was to exchange knowledge about missing and murdered Indigenous women and girls. The organization invited expert on the subject (researchers, policy makers, community members...) to have a discussion on the subject, with the aim of moving forward.

The work of NWAC for Missing and Murdered Indigenous Women and Girls

- The Sisters in Spirit campaign

The Sisters in Spirit campaign was an initiative primarily of three organizations: Native Women's Association of Canada (NWAC), Amnesty International and KAIROS. It was created in 2005 and is run by Indigenous women. The aim of Sisters in Spirit is to drive research and raise awareness on the issue of violence and victimization against Aboriginal women in Canada.

The federal government having decided to stop funding the Sisters in Spirit campaign in 2010, the campaign ended in the same year. Corbiere Lavell, one of NWAC's former presidents, said to the Aboriginal Multi-Media Society of Alberta (AMMSA): "This message is not simply about funding, but about engaging the people impacted by violence against Aboriginal women and more specifically, creating the opportunity for families who lost loved ones to have their voices heard".

From 2005 to 2010, Sisters in Spirit documented 582 cases of missing and/or murdered Indigenous women and girls over a span of twenty years.

The purpose of the Sisters in Spirit Vigils is to both provide support to the families of missing and murdered Indigenous women, and to raise awareness of the nationwide issue. These vigils were part of the Sisters in Spirit Initiative that conducted a five-year research and education and policy initiative to "address the root causes, circumstances and trends" of missing and murdered Indigenous women and girls. The movement began in 2006 when Bridget Tolley asked that a vigil be held on the steps of Parliament Hill to honour her mother, Gladys, who was killed in 2001 in Maniwaki, Quebec, and over 500 missing and murdered Indigenous women and girls across Canada. NWAC worked with Tolley to organize the event on October 4, that had a turnout of over 100 people. The Sisters in Spirit vigils can take the form of rallies, community feasts or a moment of silence. The number of vigils to take place on October 4 has grown from 11 in 2006 to 216 by 2014. These vigils involve the families directly affected, Indigenous community members, and concerned non-Indigenous citizens. The NWAC Community Resource Guide outlines the importance of involvement from men, youth, and even the media at the vigils, and to also respect the protocol of the territory it is to take place on.

- October 4

More than an event, October 4 is a movement seeking for social changes. The purpose of the Sisters in Spirit's vigils is to both provide support to the families of missing and murdered Indigenous women, and to raise awareness of the nationwide issue. These vigils were part of the Sisters in Spirit Initiative that conducted a five-year research and education and policy initiative to "address the root causes, circumstances and trends" of missing and murdered Indigenous women and girls. The movement began in 2006 when Bridget Tolley asked that a vigil be held on the steps of Parliament Hill to honour her mother, Gladys, who was killed in 2001 in Maniwaki, Quebec and over 500 missing and murdered Indigenous women and girls across Canada. NWAC worked with Tolley to organize the event on October 4, that had a turnout of over 100 people. The Sisters in Spirit vigils can take the form of rallies, community feasts or a moment of silence. The number of vigils to take place on October 4 has grown from 11 in 2006 to 216 by 2014. These vigils involve the families directly affected, Indigenous community members, and concerned non-Indigenous citizens. The NWAC Community Resource Guide outlines the importance of involvement from men, youth, and even the media at the vigils, and to also respect the protocol of the territory it is to take place on.

- Reports

In December 2015 the national government announced that it would conduct a national inquiry into this issue. NWAC has released report cards evaluating the Inquiry's progress and activities. NWAC released the first report card in December 2016 stating that National Inquiry into Missing and Murdered Indigenous Women and Girls do not have fully functional body since it is created in September 2016. NWAC also called for transparency, communication, and a process that is trauma-informed and culturally sensitive.

Their second report was released in April 2017. it identified areas where this Inquiry has failed and areas that needed more attention. The report states that a lack of informative, transparent and accountable communication left many families and communities frustrated. In the spent of six months after the creation of the national inquiry into missing and murdered indigenous women and girls, the inquiry provides too little information on its process. The report also states that "it is unclear what opportunities are available and whether all families that wish to will be able to share their experiences"

- Fact sheets

On its website, NWAC also provides fact sheets with statistics and research on different themes of the issue, such as root causes of violence against Indigenous women. These sheets are made to raise awareness and try to underline the importance of the issue using facts.

== Controversy ==
Beginning in May 2018, NWAC has faced numerous complaints regarding its working environments and treatment of staff. Staff have cited toxic work environments, concerns with upper management and the direction of the organization. Lynne Groulx, NWAC's chief executive officer, has denied all allegations and knowledge of allegations, despite evidence that Groulx was aware of issues as early as September 2018. Since voicing concerns for staff, Francyne Joe, NWAC's president, was suspended and subsequently replaced by Lorraine Whitman.
