= Jeannette Corbiere Lavell =

Canadian and Anishinaabe community worker and activist

- Born: Jeannette Vivian Corbiere; June 21, 1942 (age 84); Wikwemikong, Ontario, Canada
- Occupation: Activist
- Known for: Canada (AG) v Lavell; President of Native Women's Association of Canada; Founder of the Ontario Native Women's Association of Canada

Jeannette Corbiere Lavell CM (born June 21, 1942) is a Canadian and Anishinaabe community worker who focused on women's and children's rights. In 2018, she was honoured as a member of the Order of Canada.

== Biography ==
She was born Jeannette Vivian Corbiere in Wikwemikong, Ontario to Adam and Rita Corbiere. Her mother, a school teacher, was a co-founder of the Wikwemikong "Wiky" Powwow. Corbiere Lavell learned English from her mother and Ojibwe from her father.

Corbiere attended business college in North Bay.

=== Early activism ===
After graduation, she worked for the Native Canadian Center of Toronto as an executive secretary. She was associated with the Company of Young Canadians, which gave her an opportunity to travel around the country, and was named, in 1965, as "Indian Princess of Canada".

She was a founding member of the Ontario Native Women's Association in 1971, of the Anduhyaun Inc. (a not-for-profit helping Toronto's Indigenous women fleeing violence) in 1973, of the Toronto Native Times in 1978, and a president of the Nishnawbe Institute (Institute for Indian Studies) in Toronto.

==== Challenge to Section 12(1)(b) of the Indian Act ====
When she married David Lavell in 1970, a non-Indigenous man, Corbiere Lavell subsequently was no longer deemed an Indian according to the Indian Act. With lawyer Clayton Ruby, she challenged the Act in 1971, first failing at the county level, then winning a unanimous verdict at the Ontario Court of Appeals in 1973, but when the federal government appealed to the Supreme Court, she (and her fellow appellate, Yvonne Bedard), a 5-4 decision sided against her case.

Although her challenge failed, she inspired a later challenge, the success of which "permitted reinstatement of the First Nations women and children who had lost their status".

=== Later work ===
In 2008, she was appointed by the Anishinabek Nation as its first Commissioner on Citizenship

She served as president of the Native Women's Association of Canada (2009–2012) and as a cabinet appointee for the Commission on the Native Justice System.

She co-edited the 2006 book, "Until Our Hearts Are On the Ground: Aboriginal Mothering, Oppression, Resistance and Rebirth".

== Personal life ==
After she earned a teaching degree from the University of Western Ontario, she worked as a teacher and school principal.

Her daughter, Dawn Harvard, was the youngest ever president of the Ontario Native Women's Association.

Her son William Lavell was the first member of his community to directly work at the United Nations and carried on the legacy of commitment to humanitarian work through international relief support with the United Nations.

== Honours ==
The Ontario Native Women's Association organization established an award in honour of Corbiere Lavell in 1987.

In 1995, she was presented with the YWCA Women of Distinction Award.

In commemoration of the Persons Case, she was presented with the Governor General's Award in 2009 for making an outstanding contribution to the advancement of women's equality.

In 2016, Corbiere Lavell was awarded an honorary doctorate of laws at York University for her work as a Native women's rights activist and educator.

In April 2018 The Feminist Alliance for International Action recognized Jeannette as a member of the Indigenous Famous Six. Other members are Yvonne Bedard, Senator Sandra Lovelace Nicholas, Sharon McIvor, Lynn Gehl, and Senator Lillian Dyck.

== Awards ==
- Persons Award (2009)
- Queen Elizabeth II Diamond Jubilee Medal (2012)
- Member of the Order of Canada (2017)
- Indspire Award, Lifetime Achievement (2020)

== See also ==
- Canada (AG) v Lavell
