= Boyer =

Surname list

Boyer (French pronunciation: [bwaje]) is a French surname. In rarer cases, it can be a corruption or deliberate alteration of other names.

== Origins and statistics ==
Boyer is found traditionally along the Mediterranean (Provence, Languedoc), the Rhône valley, Auvergne, Limousin, Périgord and more generally in the Southwest of France. It is also found in the north of the country. There are two variant spellings: Boyé (southwest) and Bouyer (Loire-Atlantique, Charente-Maritime).

As of 2021, Boyer ranks 55th in the most common surnames in France. For the period 1891–1990 it ranked 34th.

Like many other surnames, it used to be a nickname describing somebody's job: "bullock driver", "cowherd", that is to say Bouvier in common French. It derives mainly from the Occitan buòu "ox", with the suffix -iar / -ier, frenchified phonetically or, further north, sometimes from a variant form in dialectal French bô, bou "ox" corresponding to common French bœuf with the suffix -ier. In French, the modern spelling -oyer [waje] avoids confusion between -oi-er [wae] and -oier [waje].

In rarer cases, it can be a corruption or deliberate alteration of several other names :

1. In England, it may come from bowyer, meaning "bow maker" or "bow seller."
2. In Turkish, the name may come from "boy-er", "boy" meaning "size" or "stature" and "er" meaning "man" or "soldier."
3. It can also be a corruption or deliberate alteration of German names like Bayer, Beyer, or Bauer.

== People with the surname ==
- Abel Boyer (1667–1729), French-English lexicographer and journalist
- Alexis de Boyer (1757–1833), French surgeon
- Andre Boyer (disambiguation), several people
- Angélique Boyer (born 1988), French-Mexican actress
- Anita Boyer (1915–1985), American Big Band singer and songwriter
- Anise Boyer (1914–2008), American dancer and actress
- Anne Boyer (born 1973), American poet and essayist
- Antide Boyer (1850–1918), French manual worker, Provençal dialect writer and journalist
- Auguste Boyer (1896–1956), French professional golfer prominent on the European circuit
- Benjamin Markley Boyer (1823–1887), Democratic member of the U.S. House of Representatives
- Bert Boyer (born nd.), director of the Centre of Alaska Native Health Research
- Bill Boyer (c. 1906–1973), entrepreneur and former vice president of the Minnesota Vikings
- Bill Boyer Jr. (born nd.), American entrepreneur, owner of Mokulele Airlines
- Blaine Boyer (born 1981), American baseball player
- Blair Boyer (born 1981), Australian politician
- Boni Boyer (1958–1996), American vocalist, multi-instrumentalist and composer
- Brandon Boyer (born 1977), American blogger and label manager
- Brant Boyer (born 1971), American former professional football player
- Brian Boyer (born 1969), American former college basketball coach
- Carl Benjamin Boyer (1906–1976), American historian of mathematics
- Chad Michael Boyer (born nd.), American politician
- Charles Boyer (1899–1978), French-American actor
- Charles-Georges Boyer (1743–1806 or 1807), French music publisher
- Charles P. Boyer (born 1942), American mathematician
- Christine Boyer (1771–1800), first wife of Lucien Bonaparte
- Claude Boyer (1618–1698), French clergyman, playwright, apologist and poet
- Claudette Boyer (1938–2013), Canadian politician
- Clément Boyer (born 1994), French professional rugby league player
- Clete Boyer (1937–2007), American baseball player, sibling of *Cloyd Boyer and *Ken Boyer
- Cloyd Boyer (1927-2021), American baseball player, sibling of *Clete Boyer and *Ken Boyer
- Darryl Boyer (born 1999), American politician
- David Boyer (born nd.), American politician
- Denise Boyer-Merdich (born 1962), American soccer player and a part of United States women's national team
- Derek Boyer (born 1969), Fijian-Australian world champion powerlifter
- Dominic Boyer (born nd.) American cultural anthropologist, professor writer, filmmaker and podcaster
- Doug Boyer (born 1947), Iowa business entrepreneur and philanthropist
- Dustin Boyer (born nd.), American singer-songwriter and guitarist
- Edie Boyer (born 1966), American discus thrower
- Elizabeth H. Boyer (born 1952), American fantasy author
- Elizabeth M. Boyer (1913–2002), American lawyer, feminist founder of Women's Equity Action League (WEAL), and writer
- Éric Boyer (born 1963), French professional road bicycle racer
- Ernest L. Boyer (1928–1995), American educator
- Ferdinand Boyer (1823-1885), was a French Legitimist politician
- François Boyer (1920–2003), French screenwriter
- Frederic Boyer (born 1961), French author of novels, poems, essays, and translations
- G. Bruce Boyer (born 1941), Journalist
- Gene Boyer (1929-2016), American helicopter pilot for the White House
- George Boyer (born 1954), Professor of Labor Economics in the School of Industrial and Labor Relations at Cornell University
- Gilles Boyer (born 1971), French politician of the Horizons party and elected Member of the European Parliament
- Glenn Boyer (1924–2013), American writer
- Greg Boyer (disambiguation), several people
- Gustave Benjamin Boyer (1871-1927), Canadian journalist and politician
- Herbert Boyer (born 1936), American biochemist and businessman
- India Boyer (1907–1998), American architect
- Isabella Eugénie Boyer (1841–1904), French-American model and heiress
- Jacques Boyer (born 1955), American cyclist and child molester
- Jacques Boyer-Andrivet (1918-1990), French politician and senator from Gironde
- Jacqueline Boyer (born 1941), French singer
- James Boyer (1736-1814), English former headmaster of Christ's Hospital
- Janet Boyer Wolfe (1933-1951), American professional wrestler
- Jean Boyer (director) (1901–1965), French director and author
- Jean Boyer (politician) (1937–2025), French politician
- Jean-Baptiste de Boyer, Marquis d'Argens (1704-1771) French rationalist, author and critic of the Catholic Church and close friend of Voltaire
- Jean-Pierre Boyer (1776–1850), Haitian President and emancipator of slaves in Santo Domingo
- Jean-Pierre Boyer (cardinal) (1829–1896), French prelate of the Catholic Church, also the Bishop of Clermont and Archbishop of Bourges
- Jeremy Boyer (born 1980), American stadium organist
- Jim Boyer (disambiguation), several people
- Joe Boyer (1890–1924), race car driver and co-winner of the 1924 Indianapolis 500.
- John W. Boyer (born 1946), American historian and academic administrator
- Joseph Boyer (1848–1930), a Canadian-American inventor and computer industrialist
- Josh Boyer (born 1977), American football coach
- Julien Boyer (born 1988), French professional footballer who plays as a left-back
- Katherine Boyer (born nd.), Canadian Métis artist
- Katy Boyer (born nd.), American actress
- Ken Boyer (1931–1982), American baseball player, sibling of *Clete Boyer and *Cloyd Boyer
- Kevin Boyer (born 1993), Canadian a Canadian skeleton racer in the 2018 Winter Olympics
- LaNada Boyer (born 1947), Native American writer and activist
- Laurent Boyer (born 1958), French radio and television host
- Laurie Boyer (born nd.), American biologist and professor at the *Massachusetts Institute of Technology
- Lewis L. Boyer (1886–1944), American politician and U.S. Representative of Illinois
- Lillian Boyer (1901-1989), American *wing walker and stunt artist
- Lisa Boyer (born nd.), College Basketball Coach
- Louis Boyer (disambiguation), several people
- Louise Boyer (1632-1697), French courtier and dame d'atour to the queen dowager of France
- Lucien Boyer (1876–1942), French music hall singer
- Lucienne Boyer (1901–1983), French singer
- Lynne Boyer (born nd.), American Professional Surfer and Painter
- Mahel Boyer (born nd.), French chess grandmaster
- Mark Boyer (born 1960), retired American football tight end
- Mark A. Boyer (born 1961), Board of Trustees Distinguished Professor in the Department of Geography at the University of Connecticut and a specialist in international relations theory
- Marie-France Boyer (born 1938), French actress, singer and author
- Marius Boyer (1885–1947), French architect and professor
- Marine Boyer (born 2000), French female artistic gymnast
- Max Boyer (born 1984), Canadian professional wrestler
- Merle Boyer (1920–2009), American jewelry designer
- Michael Boyer (born 1960), American actor and showman
- Michael P. Boyer (1831–1867), American politician from Pennsylvania
- Michelle Boyer, American politician
- Miguel Boyer (1939–2014), Spanish politician
- Mitch Boyer (1837–1876), Old West guide and interpreter of Sioux and French Canadian descent
- Myriam Boyer (born 1948), French film and television actress
- Nate Boyer (born 1981), United States Army Green Beret and actor
- Nick Boyer (born 1993), American rugby player
- Nikki Boyer (born 1975), American actress and singer-songwriter
- Otto Boyer (1874–1912), German genre painter and writer
- Pascal Boyer (born nd.), French-American anthropologist
- Patrick Boyer (born 1945), Canadian politician
- Paul Boyer (disambiguation), several people
- Peter Boyer (born 1970), American composer
- Phil Boyer (born 1949), English footballer
- Pierre François Xavier Boyer (1772–1851), French general of the Napoleonic Wars and Algerian invasion
- Pierrick Boyer (born 1974), French pastry chef operating in Australia
- Régis Boyer (1932–2017), French scholar
- Richard Boyer (disambiguation), several people
- Rick Boyer (1943–2021), American author and university professor
- Robert Stephen Boyer (born nd.), American professor of computer science, mathematics, and philosophy at The University of Texas at Austin
- Robert Hamilton Boyer (1932–1966), a visiting professor shot and killed in Charles Whitman's shooting spree at The University of Texas at Austin in 1966, known for the Boyer–Lindquist coordinates
- Robert Boyer (artist) (1948–2004), Canadian artist of aboriginal heritage
- Ruqayyah Boyer (born 1991), Surinamese-Guyanese actress, singer/songwriter, rapper and beauty pageant titleholder
- Scott Boyer (1947–2018), American musician
- Sally Boyer (born nd.), American gambler
- Spencer Boyer (born nd.), American foreign policy, national security, and international law and relations expert
- Stéphen Boyer (born 1996), French volleyball player
- Stephen A. Boyer (1828–1904), American politician from Maryland
- Stéphane Boyer (born c. 1988), Canadian politician and mayor of Laval, Quebec
- Steven Boyer (born 1979), American stage and television actor, comedian, and musician
- Tristan Boyer (born 2001), American tennis player
- Valérie Boyer (born 1962), French politician and Senator for Bouches-du-Rhône
- Wayne Boyer (born 1937), American filmmaker and professor
- Wally Boyer (born 1937), Canadian former professional ice hockey player
- Xavier Boyer (born nd.), singer of the group Tahiti 80
- Yves Boyer (born 1965), French luger who competed in the men's singles and doubles events at the 1992 Winter Olympics
- Yvonne Boyer (born 1953), first indigenous person from Ontario appointed to the Senate of Canada
- Zac Boyer (born 1971), National Hockey League right winger

== See also ==
- Boyar (surname)
- Bauer (disambiguation)
