= Järva-Jaani Parish =

Former municipality of Estonia

Coordinates: 59.039°N 25.886°E

Järva-Jaani Parish Järva-Jaani vald
- Municipality of Estonia
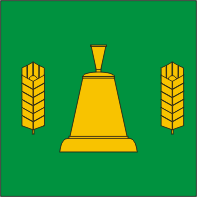
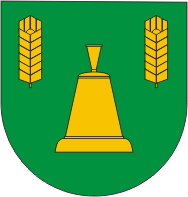
- Flag Coat of arms

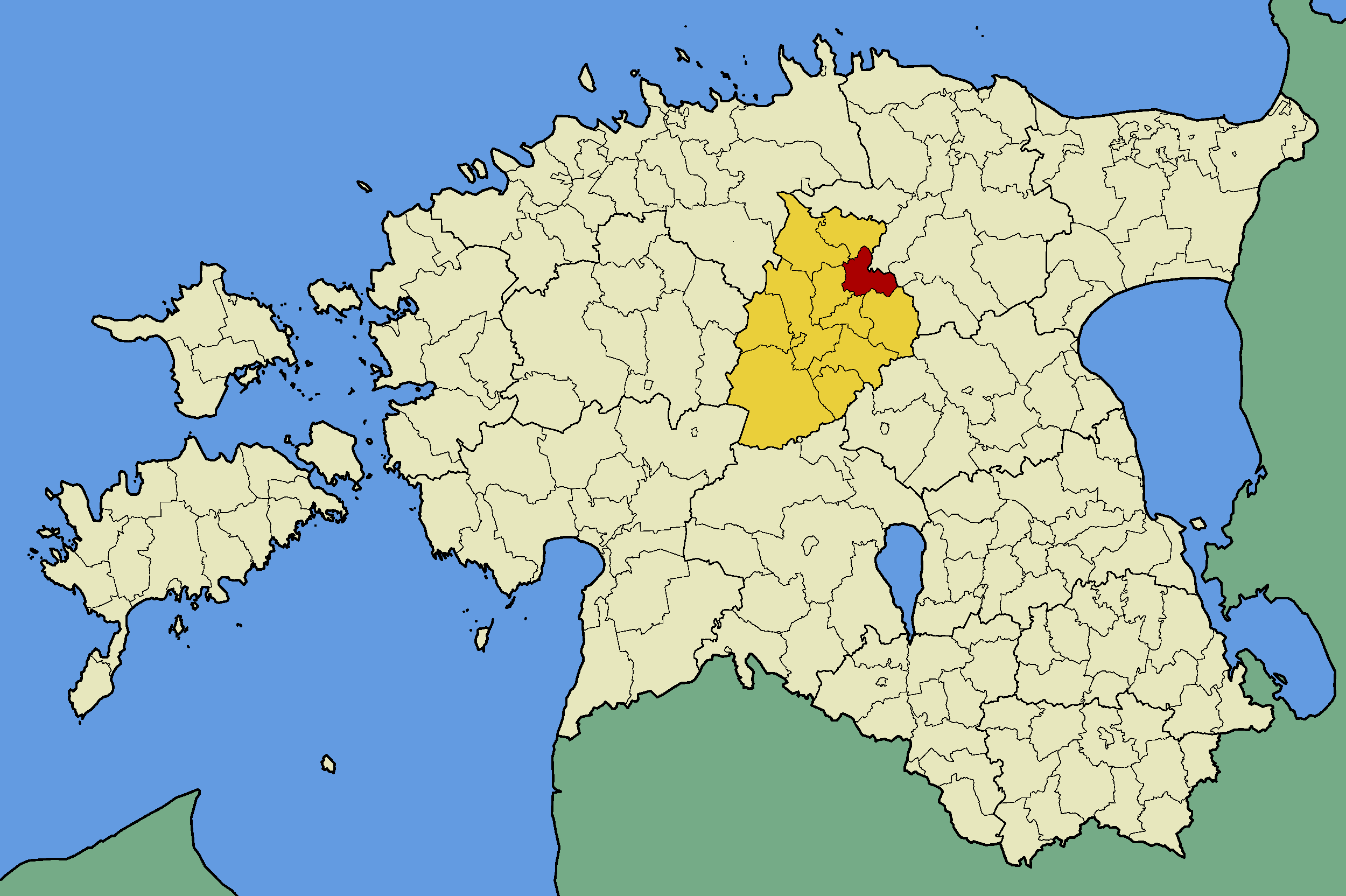
- Järva-Jaani Parish within Järva County.
- Country: Estonia
- County: Järva County
- Administrative centre: Järva-Jaani

Area
  - Total: 126 km^{2} (49 sq mi)

Population (2008)
  - Total: 1,643
  - Density: 13.0/km^{2} (33.8/sq mi)
- Website: jarva.ee/index.php?page=110

Järva-Jaani Parish (Estonian: Järva-Jaani vald) was a rural municipality of Estonia, in Järva County. It had a population of 1,643 (as of 2008) and an area of 126 km² (49 mi²).

== Populated places ==
Järva-Jaani Parish had a borough, Järva-Jaani, and 9 villages:

- Jalalõpe
- Jalgsema
- Kagavere
- Karinu
- Kuksema
- Metsla
- Metstaguse
- Ramma
- Seliküla
