= List of Métis people =

The Métis are a specific group of people, primarily from Canada's three Prairie Provinces with extensions from parts of Ontario, British Columbia, the Northwest Territories and the northwest United States. Métis have Indigenous (primarily Cree, Ojibwa) and European (primarily French) ancestry. They have a shared history and Michif language.

== Prominent Métis ==
=== Historical ===
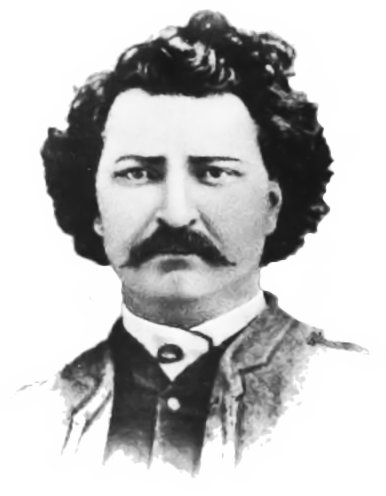
Louis Riel, c. 1884

- Howard Adams, Métis activist, author, and leader
- Andre Beauchemin, Métis; First Member of the Legislative Assembly of Manitoba for St. Vital (French Party) 1870–1874. In November 1872, Beauchemin offered to resign his seat in the Manitoba assembly so that Riel could be elected in a by-election
- Pierre Bottineau, Minnesota frontiersman, surveyor, diplomat and translator
- James P. Brady, Métis politician and activist
- Pierre Delorme, Métis politician and activist. Elected as a Member of Parliament in 1871, defeated in 1874 and re-elected in 1878
- Gabriel Dumont, Métis military leader during the North-West Rebellion
- Cuthbert Grant, Métis political and military leader
- James Isbister, was a Canadian Métis leader and he is considered to be the founder of the city of Prince Albert, Saskatchewan.
- Thomas McKay, was a Metis farmer and political figure who was the first mayor of Prince Albert, Saskatchewan
- John Norquay, Métis politician, Premier of Manitoba from 1878 to 1887 and first Indigenous premier in Canada
- Malcolm Norris, Métis politician, activist, and leader. Norris was a founder and the first vice-president of the first Alberta Métis organization (1932) called the Association des Métis d’Alberta et des Territories du Nord-Ouest (Alberta Métis Association). In 1964, he headed the Métis Association of Northern Saskatchewan
- Louis Riel, Métis leader who led the Red River Rebellion in 1869 - 1870, the provisional government of Rupert's Land, Manitoba's entry into Confederation in 1870; later led the North-West Rebellion in 1885 Riel was elected three times to the House of Commons for Provencher riding; first, in the general election of 1873, the government subsequently resigned over the Pacific Scandal in November 1873. Riel was reelected in February 1874, then expelled, then ran in the subsequent by-election, was reelected and expelled again
- Guillaume Sayer, a Métis fur trader whose trial was a turning point in the ending of the monopoly of the Hudson's Bay Company (HBC) of the fur trade in North America
- Louis Schmidt, Métis politician, Riel's Secretary and, in their youth, Riel's classmate. Born in 1844 he was known as Louis Laferté until Bishop Taché changed it in 1858. Louis Schmidt made the first of numerous petitions on behalf of the Métis' to the federal government over rights to their lands and their call for proper political representation. See Louis Schmidt: A Forgotten Métis in Riel and the Métis Ed. A.S Lussier (1979) Manitoba Métis Federation Press

=== Architects ===
- Douglas Cardinal, architect; of Métis and Blackfoot ancestry. He designed the Museum of Canadian History and did the building designs for the Oujé-Bougoumou community of the James Bay Cree. This work won the “We the People” United Nations Community Award

=== Artists and writers ===
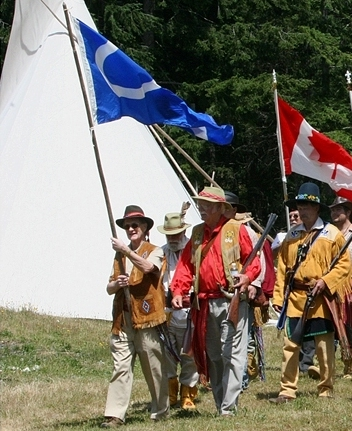
George R. D. Goulet, 2007 (shown carrying the Métis flag) and leading the Grand Entry at the Red River West celebration

- Keith Barker, playwright
- Katherine Boyer, Métis/Settler artist
- Terril Calder, animator and artist
- Joe Fafard (artist), Métis artist from Saskatchewan whose work has been featured across Canada and around the world
- Sandra Birdsell, daughter of a Métis man and a Russian Mennonite woman; based her award-winning novel Children of the Day in part on her parents' experiences in Manitoba in the 1920s to 1950s
- Robert Boyer (1948–2004); Métis Cree artist, best known for his politically charged "Blanket Statements" series of paintings
- Maria Campbell, Métis writer and filmmaker; born in northern Saskatchewan in 1940; brought the struggles of modern-day Métis and Aboriginal people to the public through her breakthrough book, Halfbreed (1973), and the collaborative play, Jessica (1982); captured the sound and song of traditional stories through her work in dialect, Stories of the Road Allowance People (1996)
- Laura de Jonge, Métis family advocate, corporate social responsibility practitioner, filmmaker and magazine founder
- Cherie Dimaline, writer, was awarded the Anskohk Fiction Book of the Year Award in 2013
- Justin Ducharme, filmmaker and screenwriter
- Danis Goulet, filmmaker
- George R. D. Goulet, best-selling Métis author; books include The Trial of Louis Riel: Justice and Mercy Denied, The Metis: Memorable Events and Memorable Personalities, and The Métis in British Columbia: From Fur Trade Outposts to Colony
- Matthew MacKenzie, playwright
- Dylan Miner, Métis printmaker, writer and conceptual artist
- Rick Rivet (born 1949), painter
- Gregory Scofield, acclaimed poet, beadwork artist, dramatist, non-fiction writer, activist and educator
- Jesse Thistle, academic and writer
- Kamala Todd, community planner, filmmaker, curator
- Loretta Todd, filmmaker, producer, cultural theorist
- Venus, drag performer
- Katherena Vermette, writer
- Rhayne Vermette, filmmaker
- Christine Welsh, documentary filmmaker and academic
- Blair Palmer Yoxall, writer

=== Business people and entrepreneurs ===
- Keenan Beavis - entrepreneur and investor, founder of Longhouse

=== Musicians ===
- Arlette Alcock, musician, songwriter, and social activist
- Celeigh Cardinal, singer-songwriter
- iskwē, singer-songwriter
- Berk Jodoin, singer-songwriter
- Charlie Kerr, lead singer of Hotel Mira
- Jani Lauzon, musician
- Brianna Lizotte, fiddler
- Andrea Menard, actress, playwright, and singer
- Amanda Rheaume, singer-songwriter
- Sister Ray, singer-songwriter
- Andrina Turenne, singer-songwriter
- Laura Vinson, musician
- Ruby Waters, musician
- The Pelletier Boys, family band.

=== Politicians, activists, lawyers, physicians and judges ===
- André Beauchemin, politician in Manitoba
- Rod Bruinooge, member of Parliament, Parliamentary Secretary to the Minister of Indian Affairs & Northern Development, and Federal Interlocutor for Métis and Non-Status Indians
- Brian Bowman, mayor of Winnipeg
- Thelma J Chalifoux, first Indigenous woman appointed to the Senate of Canada, established Michif Cultural and Resource Institute
- Clément Chartier, president of the World Council of Indigenous Peoples
- David Chartrand, leader of the Manitoba Metis Federation
- Bertha Clark-Jones, Cree-Métis activist and Royal Canadian Air Force member
- Todd Ducharme, first Métis judge appointed to the Ontario Superior Court of Justice
- Shelly Glover, member of Parliament and Parliamentary Secretary for Official Languages
- Carole James, leader of the British Columbia New Democratic Party
- Rick Laliberte, member of Parliament
- Glen McCallum, president of Métis Nation—Saskatchewan
- Bob McLeod, member of the Legislative Assembly of the Northwest Territories
- D'Arcy McNickle, writer, Native American activist, college professor and administrator, and anthropologist
- Gerald Morin, president of the Métis National Council and the Métis Nation—Saskatchewan
- Derrick O'Keefe, Rabble.ca editor; Canadian anti-war movement leader
- Dan Vandal, member of Parliament and Parliamentary Secretary for Indigenous Services
- Muriel Stanley Venne, community leader and Indigenous rights activist

=== Military ===
- Francis Godon, member of the Royal Winnipeg Rifles during the Second World War
- Henry Norwest, First World War sniper

=== Sports ===
- Calen Addison, professional ice hockey player for the Utica Comets
- Arron Asham, professional ice hockey player

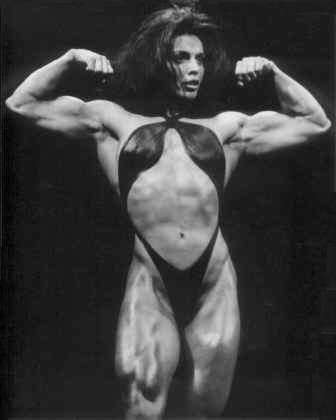
Sharon Bruneau, a Canadian champion bodybuilder

- René Bourque, professional ice hockey player
- Sharon Bruneau, bodybuilder and fitness model
- Kyle Chipchura, professional ice hockey player
- Connor Dewar, professional ice hockey player for the Pittsburgh Penguins
- Kerri Einarson, national curling champion
- Theoren Fleury, professional ice hockey player
- Terry Fox, creator of Marathon of Hope
- Travis Hamonic, professional ice hockey player for the Detroit Red Wings
- Dwight King, professional ice hockey player
- Heather Mandoli, Canadian Olympic rower
- Anthony Carelli, professional wrestler (known as Santino Marella)
- Vic Mercredi, Atlanta Flames first round draft pick
- Kevin O'Toole, 1996 North American light heavyweight bodybuilding champion
- Wade Redden, NHL defenceman
- Sheldon Souray, NHL defenceman
- Bryan Trottier, NHL Hall of Fame centre

=== Others ===
- Siera Bearchell, winner of Miss Universe Canada 2016
- Tantoo Cardinal, actress
- Riscylla Shaw, Anglican bishop
- Roseanne Supernault, actress
- Zoe Todd, academic

== See also ==
- List of Canadian Inuit
- List of First Nations people
- Indigenous Canadian personalities
