= Métis Art =

Métis Art refers to artwork that is produced by the Métis people. The identification of these works is usually done through certain styles and mediums—examples include creating intricate visual pieces using beads, working with leather and animal hide, and the creation of traditional sashes—but it can also be attributed simply as works done by one who identifies as Métis. The creation of these forms of art began as a combination of motifs and cultural symbols from both Indigenous and European cultures, and still carries through in Métis art made to this day. Métis artwork generally has themes of identity exploration and fluidity, the importance and power of familial connection, and contemporary issues among the people.

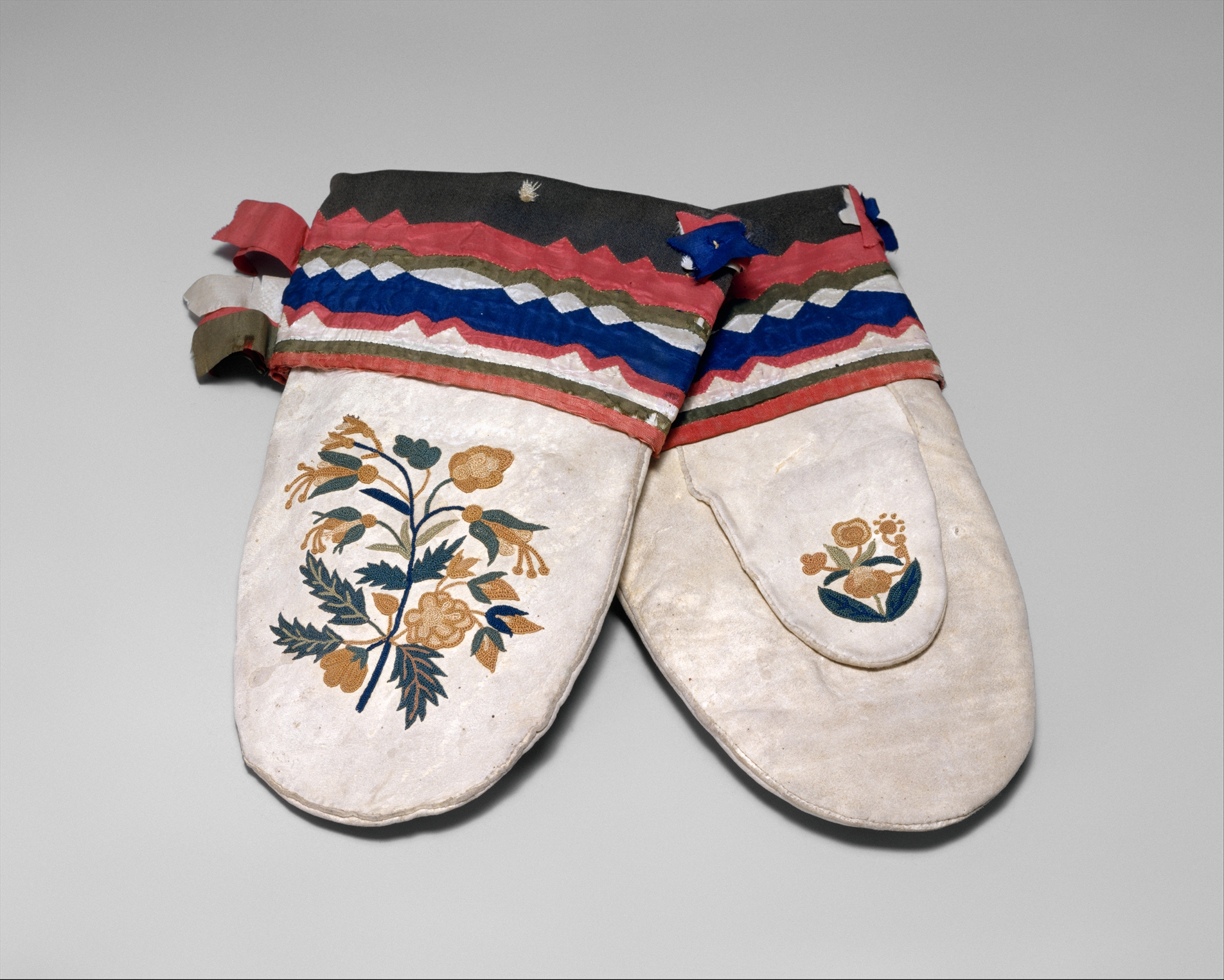
A pair of beaded mittens made by an unknown Cree/Métis artist, Metropolitan Museum of Art

== Types ==
=== Beading ===
Beading is a very prominent form of art that the Métis people use; so much so that the Métis people are also called the "flower beadwork people". In this form, there are usually many portrayals of certain kinds of flowers and plants, but it is not limited to that alone. The use of flowers comes from the combination of various First Nations beadwork styles and French-Canadian styles of making embroidery.

A bag made by an anonymous artist as a gift, containing a beaded floral pattern on it, Cleveland Museum of Art

=== Leatherwork and Clothing ===
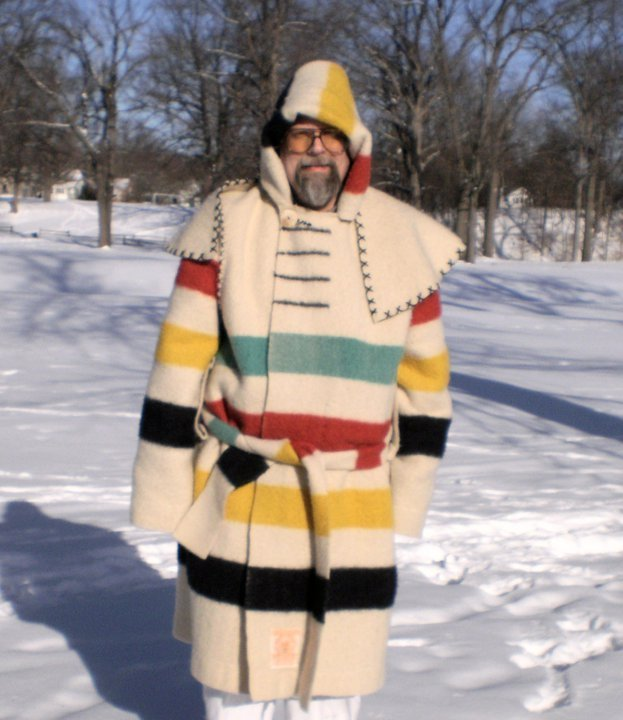
An example of a Capote, made with the Hudson's Bay point blanket

Along with beading, the Métis create articles of clothing and objects of use with leathers and animal hide. Such examples of these are mittens, hats, boots, and bags. Métis people made clothing using various materials, including some that come from the Hudson's Bay Company. Jackets made from wool that came from the company were called Capotes.

=== Painting ===
Styles for painting can vary. Some take a more contemporary form, while others are more stylized and even more reminiscent to beadwork. Depictions of scenes related to Métis history and contemporary issues within the community, along with depictions of flowers and plants akin to beading imagery are common in this style of artworks.

=== Jigging ===
Jigging is a form of dance that originated in Europe, then was taken in by the Métis people and changed into a Métis form of expression. Métis jigging came into existence around Winnipeg, once known as the Red River Settlement. It was created by mixing European and Indigenous musical forms, and then evolved into its own style of music and dance.

A pertinent song and dance that has to do with Métis jigging is the Red River Jig.

== Notable Métis Artists ==
- Christi Belcourt
- Katherine Boyer
- Robert Boyer
- Terril Calder
- Maria Campbell
- Joe Fafard
- Edward Poitras
- Deanna Parker
- Rick Rivet
- Gregory Scofield
- Adele Arseneau

== See also ==
- Category: Métis artists
- List of Métis People
- "Li Salay" Exhibition at the Art Gallery of Alberta
