= Boyars (surname) =

Boyars is a surname. Notable people with the name include:

- Arthur Boyars (1925–2017), British poet, musicologist, and publisher, married to Marion
- Marion Boyars (1927–1999), American-British book publisher, married to Arthur

== See also ==
- Boyer
- Boyar (surname)
