= Kevin O'Toole =

Kevin O'Toole may refer to:

- Kevin F. O'Toole, American attorney and gaming regulator
- Kevin J. O'Toole (born 1964), American politician
- Kevin O'Toole (bodybuilder) (born 1965), Canadian bodybuilder and mixed martial artist
- Kevin O'Toole (soccer), American soccer player
- "Kevin J. O'Toole", a song by Street Dogs on the album State of Grace
