= Metsla =

Metsla may refer to:

- Metsla, Järva County, Estonia
- Metsla, Viljandi County, Estonia
