= Boyar (surname) =

Boyar is a surname. Notable people with the name include:

- Burt Boyar (1927–2018), American voice actor and theatre writer
- Joan Boyar (born 1955), American-Danish computer scientist
- Lombardo Boyar (born 1973), American television and voice actor
- Monica Boyar (1920–2013), Dominican-American nightclub singer
- Robert M. Boyar (1937–1978), American physician and endocrinologist
- Sully Boyar (1923–2001), American film and television actor

== See also ==
- Boyer
- Boyars (surname)
