= Eduard von Gebhardt =

German painter (1838–1925)

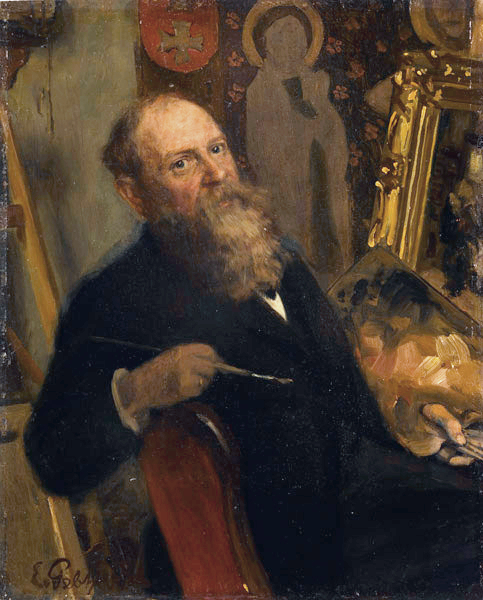
- Self-portrait (date unknown)
- Born: 13 June 1838; Järva-Jaani
- Died: 3 February 1925 (aged 86); Düsseldorf

Franz Karl Eduard von Gebhardt (13 June 1838 – 3 February 1925) was a Baltic German painter of portraits and historical scenes, and a professor at the Kunstakademie Düsseldorf.

== Biography ==
He was born to Ferdinand Theodor von Gebhardt (1803–1869), Provost and member of the Consistorial Council in Reval, and his wife, Wilhelmine, née von Glehn (1808–1880). He graduated from the local gymnasium at sixteen, and enrolled at the Imperial Academy of Arts in Saint Petersburg, where he studied for three years.

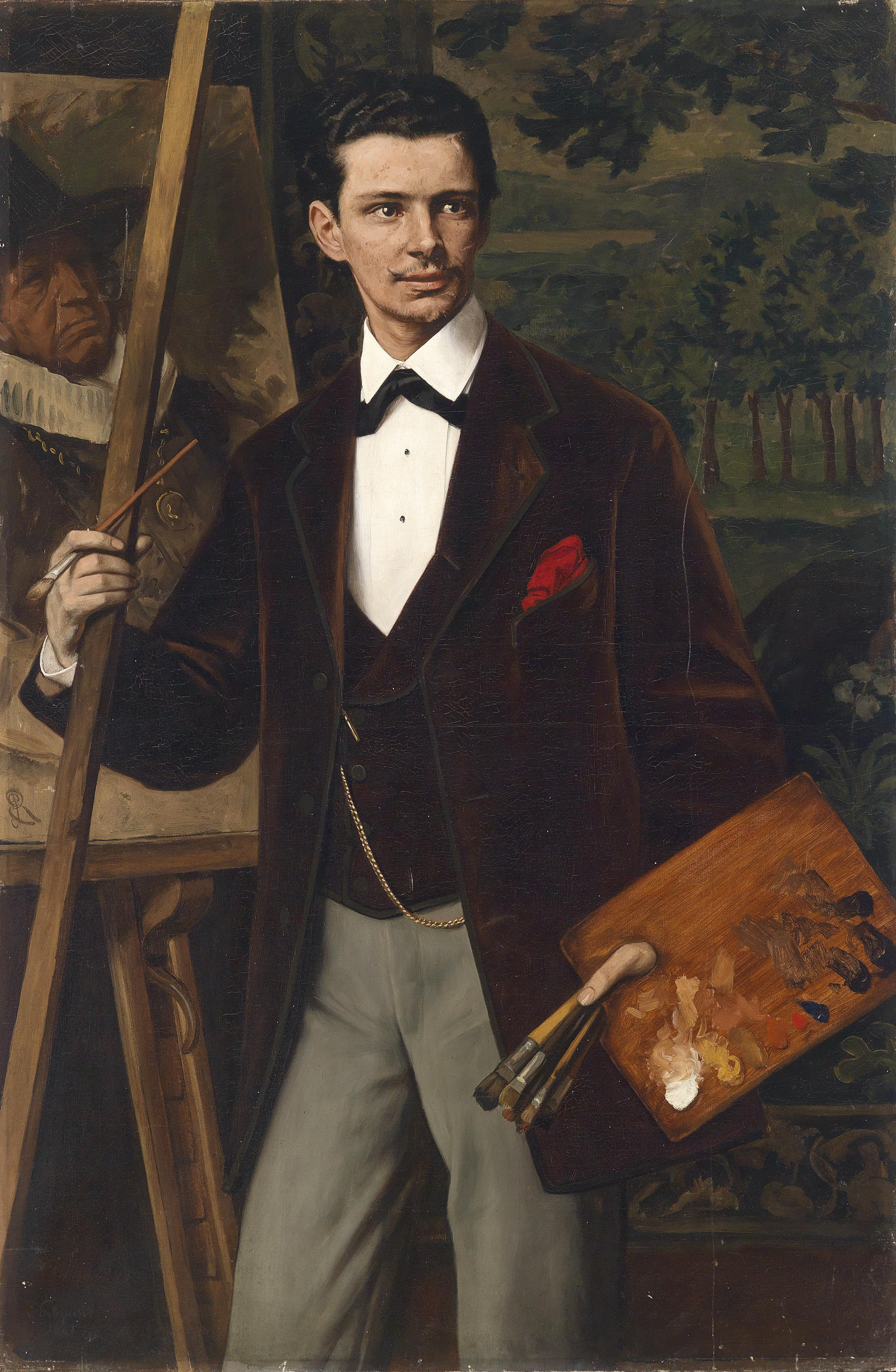
Portrait of Eduard von Gebhardt (1881)

He then spent two years travelling, spending some time in Karlsruhe, where he took classes at the Academy of Fine Arts. He arrived in Düsseldorf in 1860, and became a student of Wilhelm Sohn, who gave him such wholehearted encouragement that he decided to stay there. He settled on a street which was the home of several other artists and their studios.

In 1872, he married a local woman, Klara Jungnick (1851–1897). The following year, he was named a professor at the Kunstakademie. His best-known students included Otto Boyer and Carl Schmitz-Pleis.

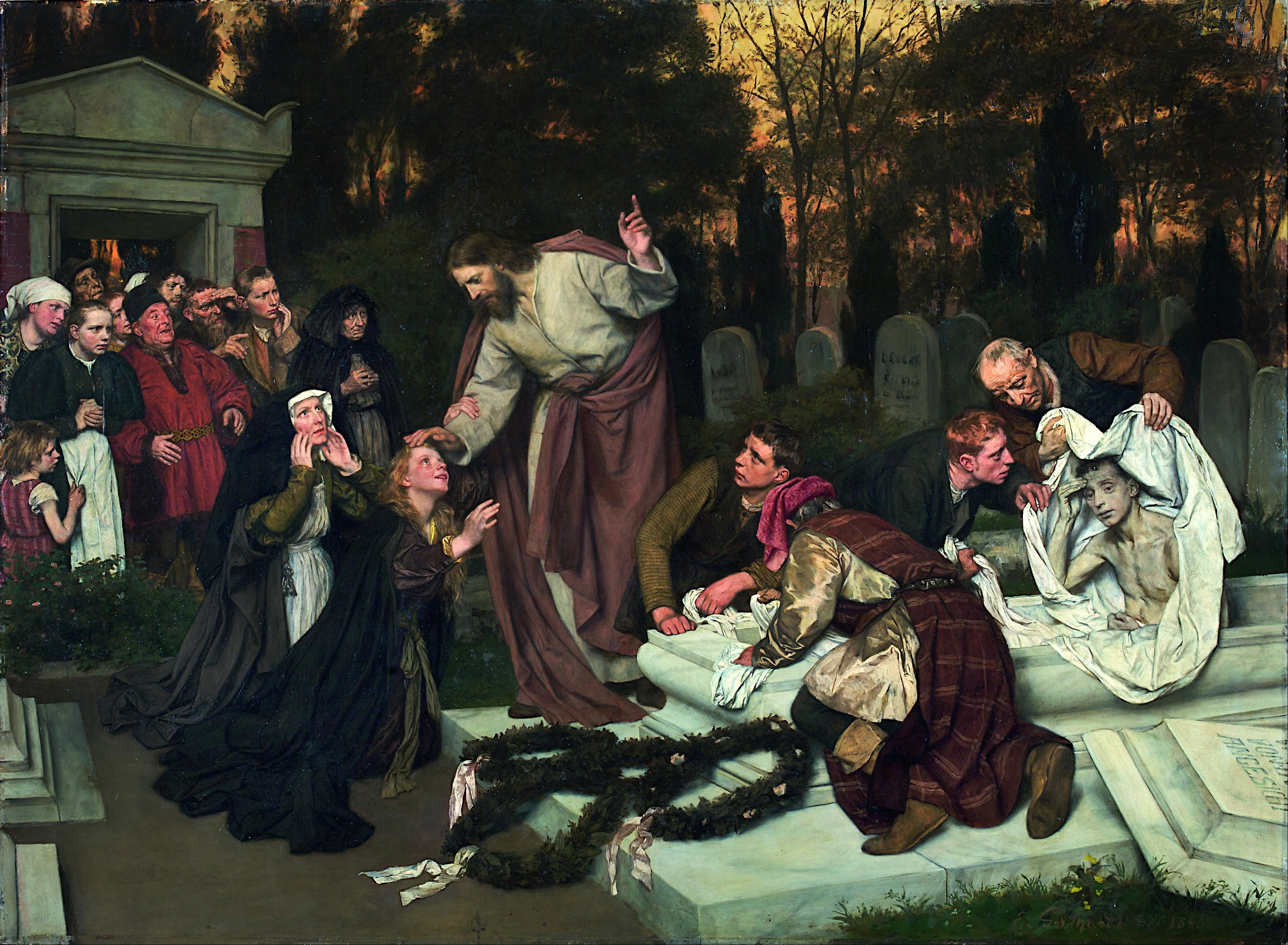
The Raising of Lazarus

On the occasion of his seventieth birthday, in 1908, the Galerie Eduard Schulte in Berlin held a large exhibit of his works. At the Große Berliner Kunstausstellung of 1918, he was awarded a gold medal. Not long before his death he became an Ehrenbürger (Honorary Citizen) of Düsseldorf. He was interred at the North Cemetery.

His home and studio at Rosenstraße Nr. 41 became a retirement home for the Mutual Aid Association of the Verein der Düsseldorfer Künstler. Streets were named after him in Essen and Wuppertal.

== Work ==
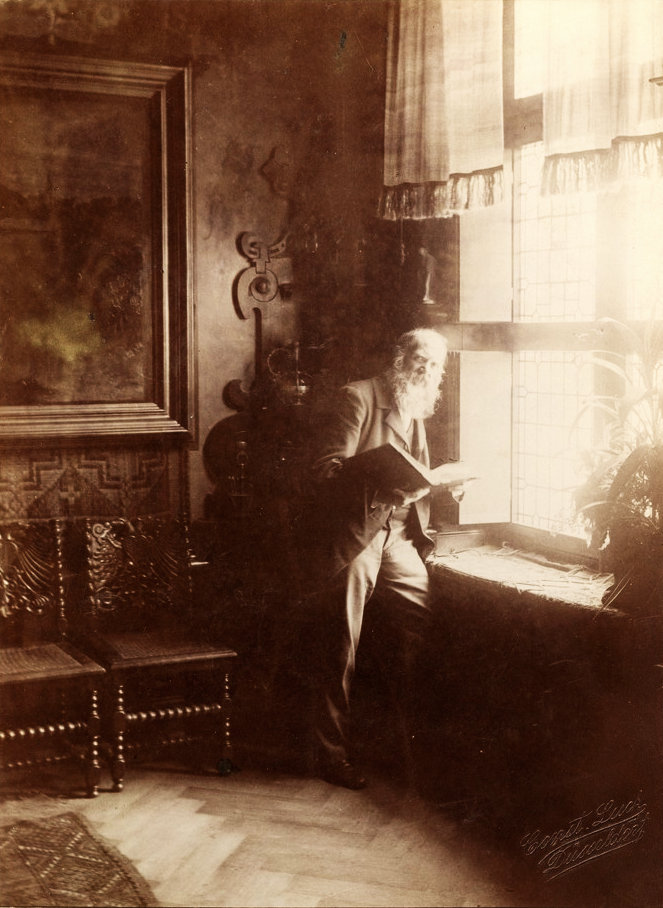
Eduard von Gebhardt

Due to his father's profession, he was inclined to religious themes from the beginning. His models were the Dutch and German masters of the 15th and 16th centuries, and he strove for a realistic presentation. It was said that what he gained in truthfulness was a loss for beauty. Some of his best-known Biblical scenes are:

- "Christ on the Cross" (1866, St Mary's Cathedral, Tallinn)
- "The Last Supper" (1870, National Gallery, Berlin)
- "Crucifixion" (1873, Hamburg Kunsthalle)
- "Ascension of Christ" (1881, National Gallery, Berlin)
- "Taking Care of Christ's Body" (1883, Dresden Gallery)
- "Jacob and the Angel" (1893, Dresden Gallery)
- "Christ and the Rich Youth" (1892, Düsseldorf Gallery)
- "Sermon on the Mount" (1893, Düsseldorf Gallery)
- "Healing of the Palsied" (1895, Breslau Museum)
- "The Raising of Lazarus" (1896, Museum Kunstpalast)

He also painted excellent portraits; making sketches of prototypical peasants, which he drew while visiting Estonia. There, he was a tutor to famous Estonian painters such as Ants Laikmaa, and the brothers, Kristjan and Paul Raud. Many of works were considered for inclusion in the series of trading cards issued by the Stollwerck chocolate company.

== Other selected works ==
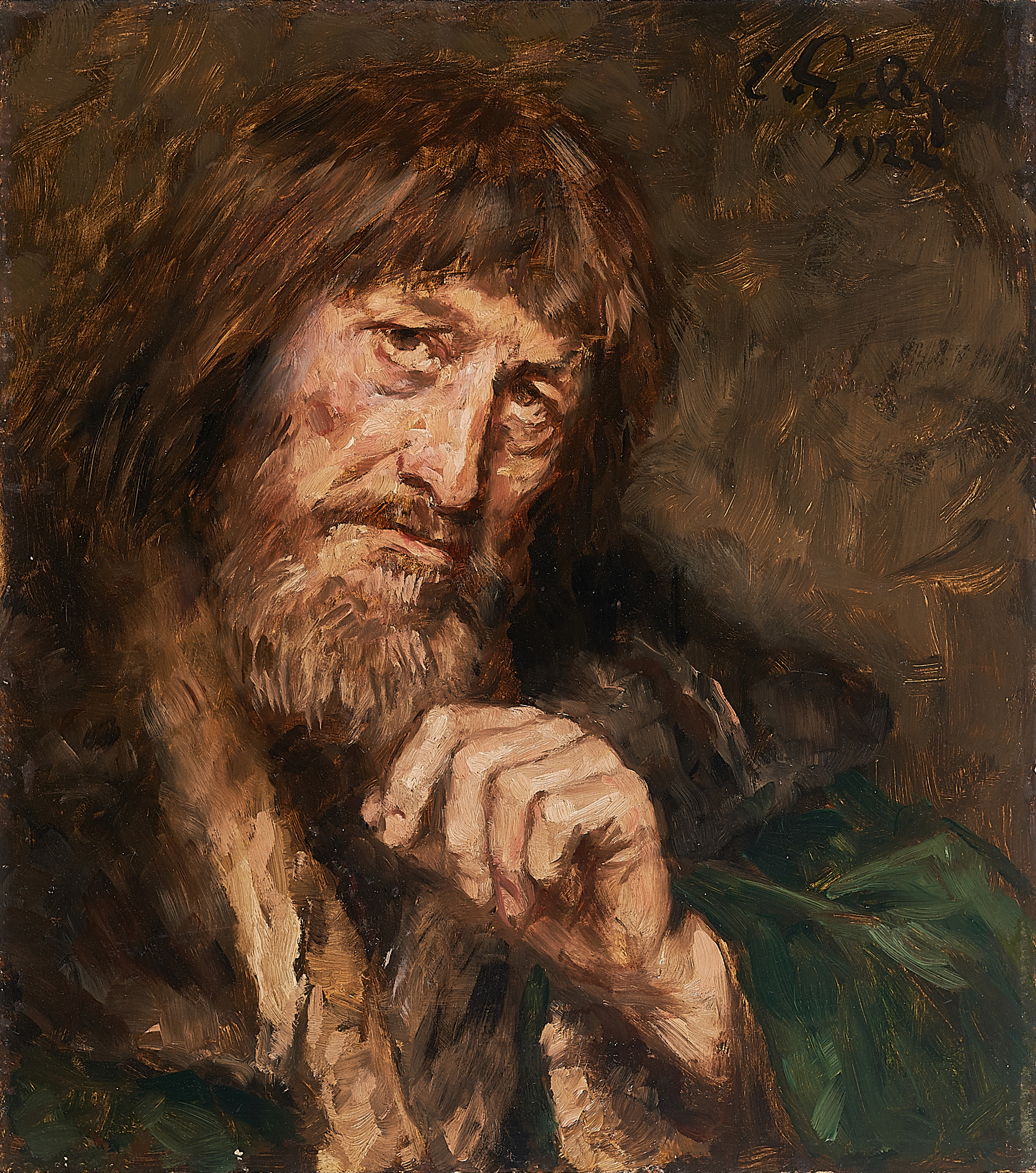
Thoughtful Man
with a Beard (1922)

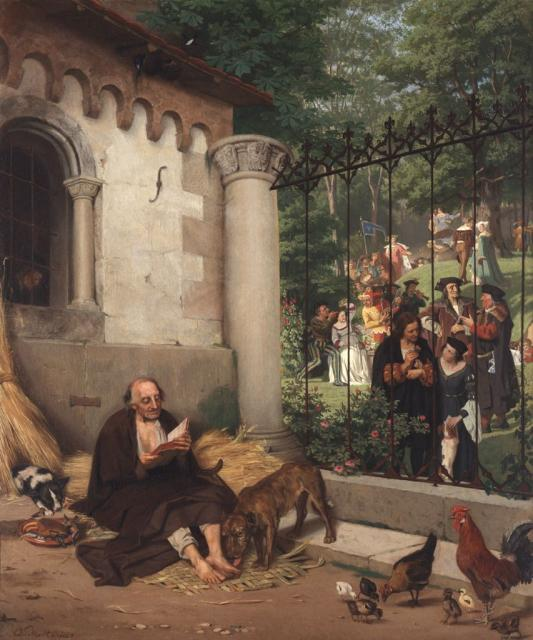
Lazarus and the
Rich Man (1865)

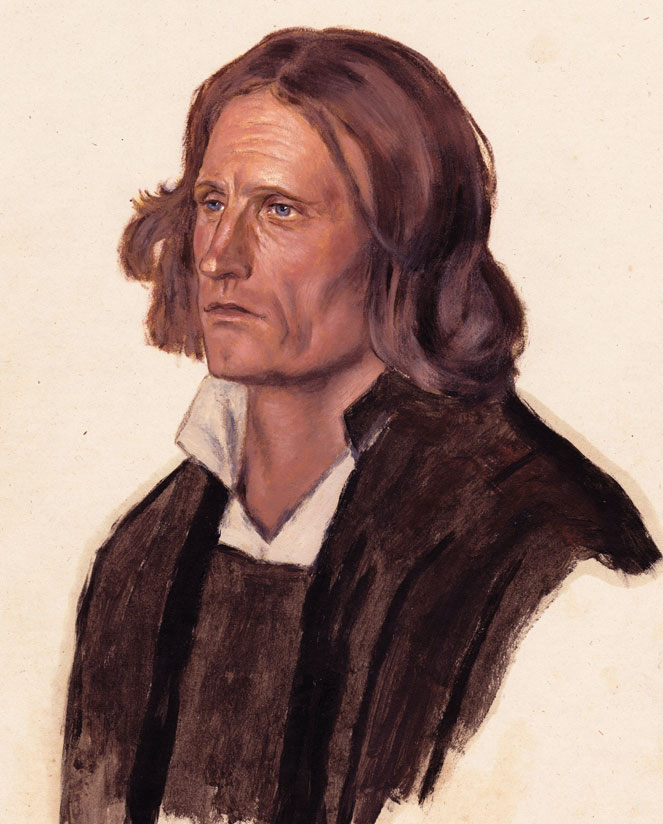
Estonian Peasant (1867)

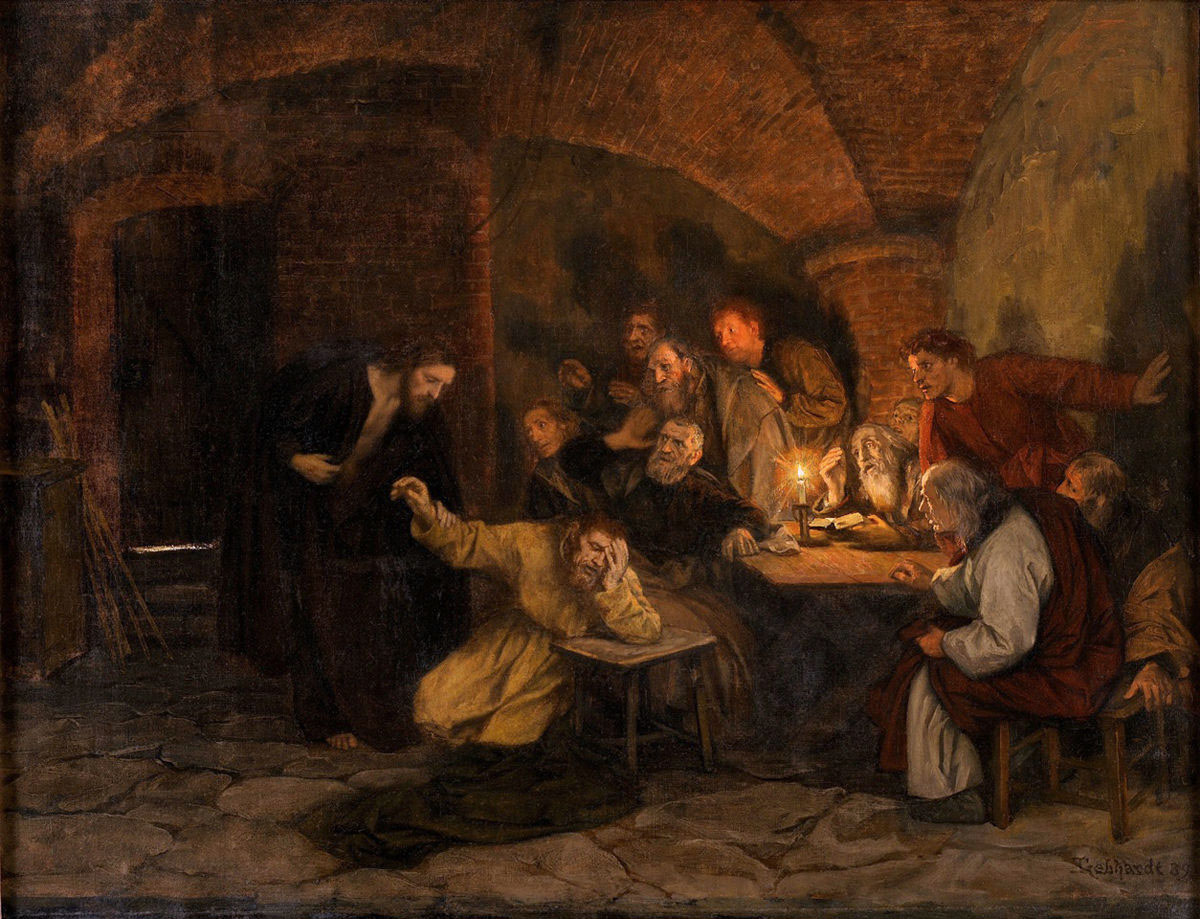
Doubting Thomas (date unknown)

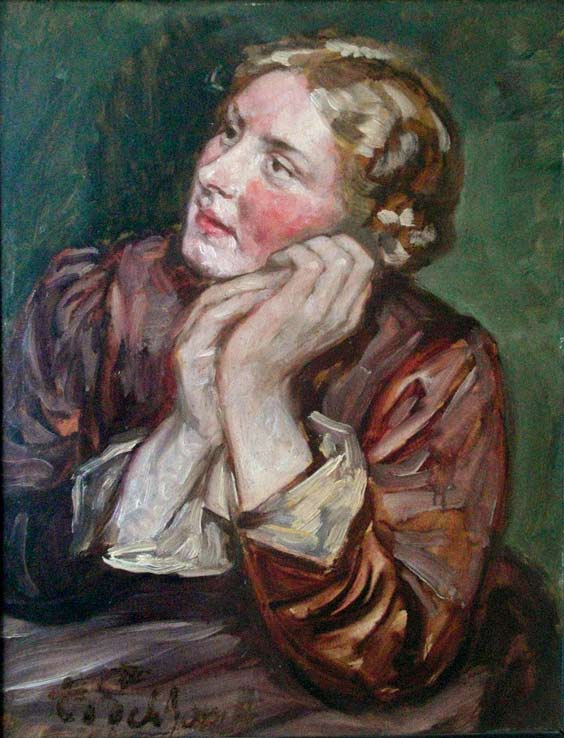
Portrait of a Woman (date unknown)
