= Johan Pitka =

Estonian military personnel

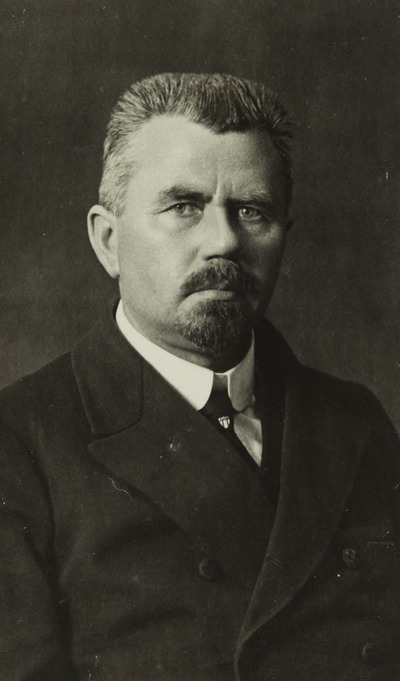
- Born: 19 February 1872; Jalgsema, Kreis Jerwen, Governorate of Estonia, Russian Empire
- Died: September 1944 (aged 72); Estonia or Baltic Sea
- Military career
- Allegiance: Estonia
- Branch: Estonian Navy
- Service years: 1918–1920
- Rank: Rear admiral
- Conflicts: Estonian War of Independence; World War II
- Awards: Cross of Liberty (Estonia); Order of St Michael and St George; Order of Lāčplēsis; Order of the Cross of the Eagle

Johan Pitka, VR I/1, KCMG (also Juhan Pitka; 19 February 1872 – September 1944) was an Estonian entrepreneur and sea captain who served as the Commander of the Estonian Navy during the Estonian War of Independence.

Pitka was one of the central figures in founding the Estonian Defence Forces and the Estonian Navy of the newly established Estonian Republic at the end of World War I in 1918. Pitka was appointed the Commander of the Estonian Navy in December 1918 and led it through the victorious Estonian War of Independence without losing a ship.

Due to his commitment to his country Pitka has been referred to as "the Spirit of the Estonian War of Independence".

== Early life ==
Johan Pitka was born on 19 February 1872 in Jalgsema, Kreis Jerwen in the Governorate of Estonia of the Russian Empire, into an Estonian family.

Pitka studied at Käsmu, Kuressaare and Paldiski marine schools and became a Master Mariner. From 1889 to 1907 he worked on sailing ships. In 1895, he was on the first sailing ship to transit the Kiel Canal in Germany. From 1904 to 1911, he lived in United Kingdom. After the beginning of the Russian Revolution in 1917, Pitka became active in Estonia and started organizing returning Estonian soldiers who fought in the Imperial Russian Army during World War I. After the Bolsheviks sentenced him to death, he was forced to go underground. When the Germans occupied Estonia in 1918, Pitka began to organize the Estonian Defence League.

== Estonian War of Independence ==
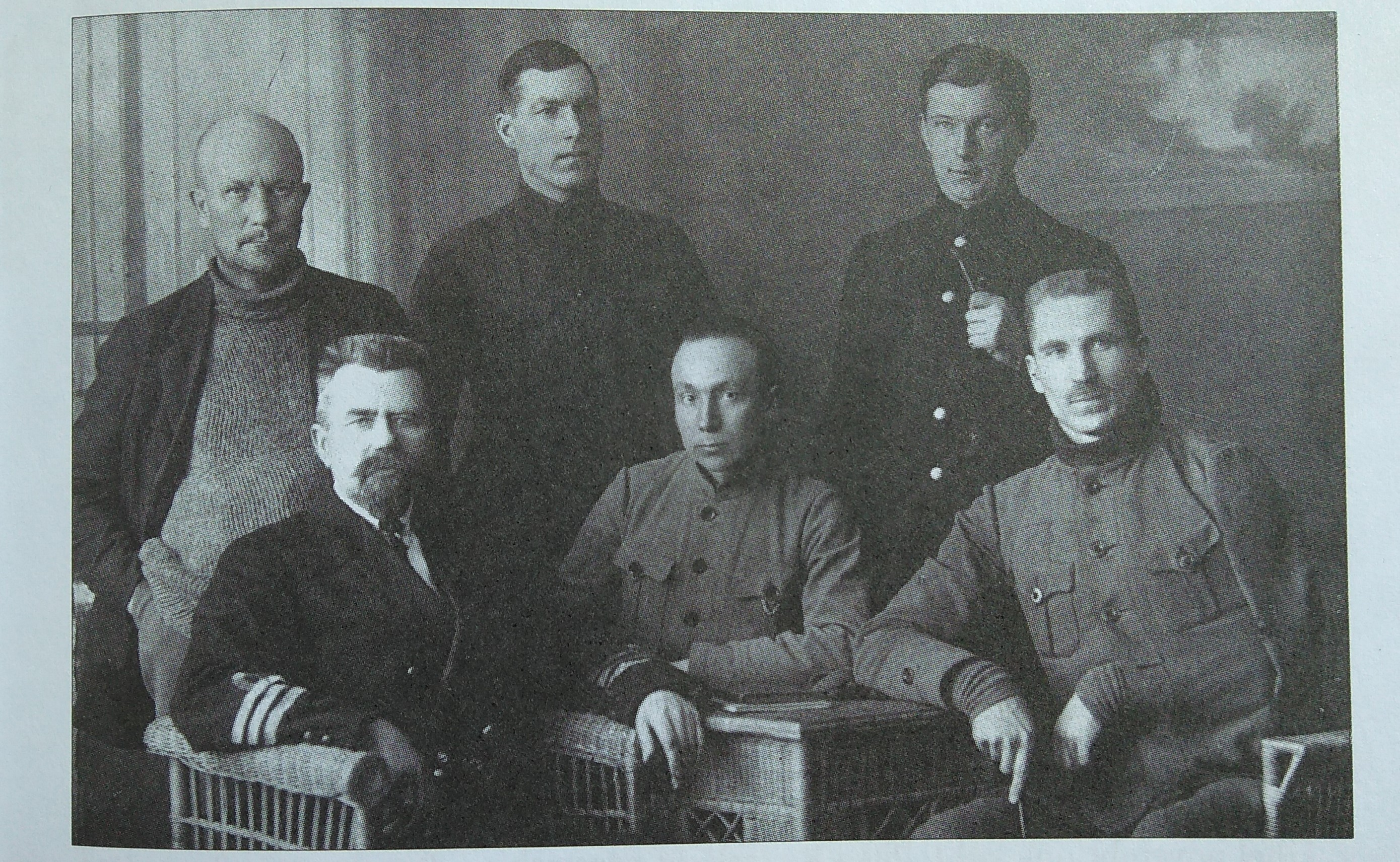
Commanders of armored trains in 1919, Johan Pitka is on the bottom left.

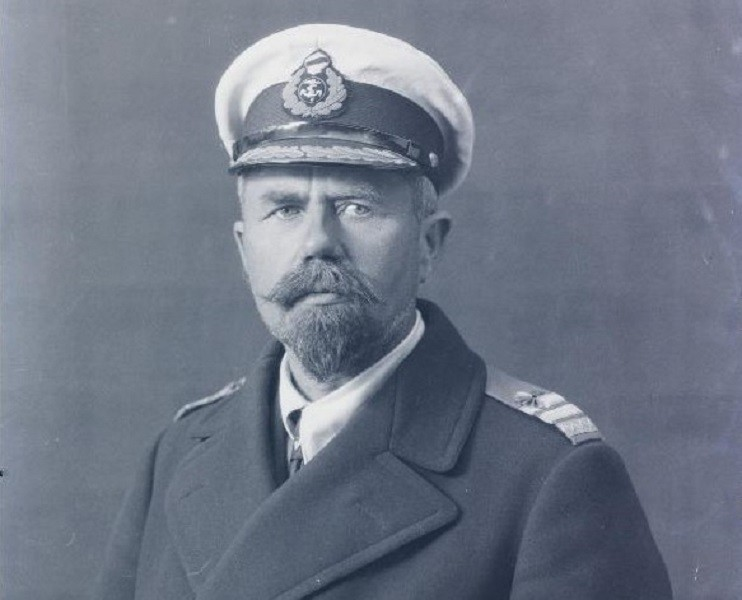
Johan Pitka

At the beginning of the Estonian War of Independence, the Defence League was one of the main forces of the Republic of Estonia, and at that time Pitka also started organising the armoured trains. The first armoured train was ready ten days after the beginning of the war, and the second became ready two weeks later. In total, 12 armoured trains were built during the war (only one was lost in battle), and they played a crucial role in Estonian victory in the war. Many called Pitka "the father of the armoured trains" and "the Spirit of the War of Independence" for this. Pitka was also one of the main organizers of the Estonian Navy, being appointed commander in December 1918 and leading it in all major operations, including supporting the Estonian 1st Division in the capture of Narva from the Russian SFSR in January 1919, and supporting the Estonian 3rd Division by attacking Landeswehr naval fortifications in Riga in July 1919. He achieved the rank of a rear admiral in September 1919.

Pitka retired from military activity in 1920, and for his service in the Baltic region during and after the Russian Revolution, he was awarded a knighthood – Knight Commander of St. Michael and St. George (KCMG) – by Britain's King George V upon the recommendation of British Admiral Sir Walter Cowan.

== Canada ==
As a former merchant seaman and Canadian Pacific Railway Co. representative, Pitka had some familiarity with Canada's immigration policies, the availability of land for homesteading, and Canada's natural beauty. The promise of new roads in and extension of the railway caused Pitka to establish a settlement in the Sowchea area of Fort St. James, British Columbia. The Sowchea area was on the other side of Stuart Lake from the Hudson's Bay Company trading post.

On 3 April 1924, a group of Estonian settlers arrived in Fort St. James whose population was about 50 Caucasians and 500 indigenous natives. The initial settlers were Pitka's family consisting of: Lady Mari-Helene Pitka, sons Edward and Stanley, daughters Saima and Linda and son-in law Lt. Aleksander Päären; families Andrekson, Rosin and Saar; Col. Steinman, Mr. Nilk and Mr. Pärtelson with wives; and Messrs. Kuusk, Olem, Puhm, Sulakatk, Vaimel, Unger and Wilmanson. They began homesteading on more than 300 hectares of land. The Estonian settlers were happy living with the Hudson Bay officials, the local Dakelh people and other residents. Although they tried growing crops, sheep farming, dairy farming and sawmilling, a sustainable existence proved elusive, largely because it was extremely difficult to get their goods to market given a change in the Provincial Government and a devaluation of the Canadian dollar during the Great Depression. The delayed local development and frustrating access to markets caused all members of the group to move elsewhere or return to Estonia by 1932. Landmarks around Fort St. James still bear their name (e.g. Pitka Mountain, Pitka Bay, Pitka Bay Resort, Lind(a) Lake, Colony Point and Paaren's Beach Provincial Park). In 2009, a monument honouring Pitka was unveiled in Fort St. James. The Pitkas had some prosperous years upon return to Estonia. Pitka was one of the leaders of the League of Liberators for a short time but left the organisation in 1932. He was also a member of the National Constituent Assembly (Rahvuskogu) in 1937. Following the Soviet occupation of Estonia in 1940, Pitka escaped to Finland, and his three sons were arrested by the Soviets and died in captivity.

== Disappearance ==
In April 1944, Pitka returned to Estonia as the frontline of the Eastern Front of World War II was approaching the country again. He entered Estonia without permission from German officials and began to organize a military defence while living underground. The Germans gave him permission to return after he had already been in the country for several months, and allowed him to establish his own armed unit. In September, when the Germans were retreating from Estonia, Jüri Uluots organized a new Estonian government headed by Otto Tief. An appeal by Pitka was published in a newspaper in Tallinn, calling for volunteers to fight against the imminent Red Army offensive. Around 600 men joined the unit and began training at a camp in Kehra, with the 20th Waffen Grenadier Division of the SS (1st Estonian). Pitka's unit fought the last defence of Tallinn against the Red Army, but were eventually pushed west and he disappeared. The circumstances of his disappearance remain unknown, and he is variously reported to have died in battle against Soviet forces or on the Baltic Sea while fleeing to Sweden.

After the Second World War, there were rumors that Pitka was still alive, leading Estonian partisans (the Forest Brothers) against Soviet forces.

Pitka's wife and daughters with their husbands fled to Sweden in 1944, re-immigrated to Canada in 1948, settled in Vancouver and are buried there.

== Awards ==
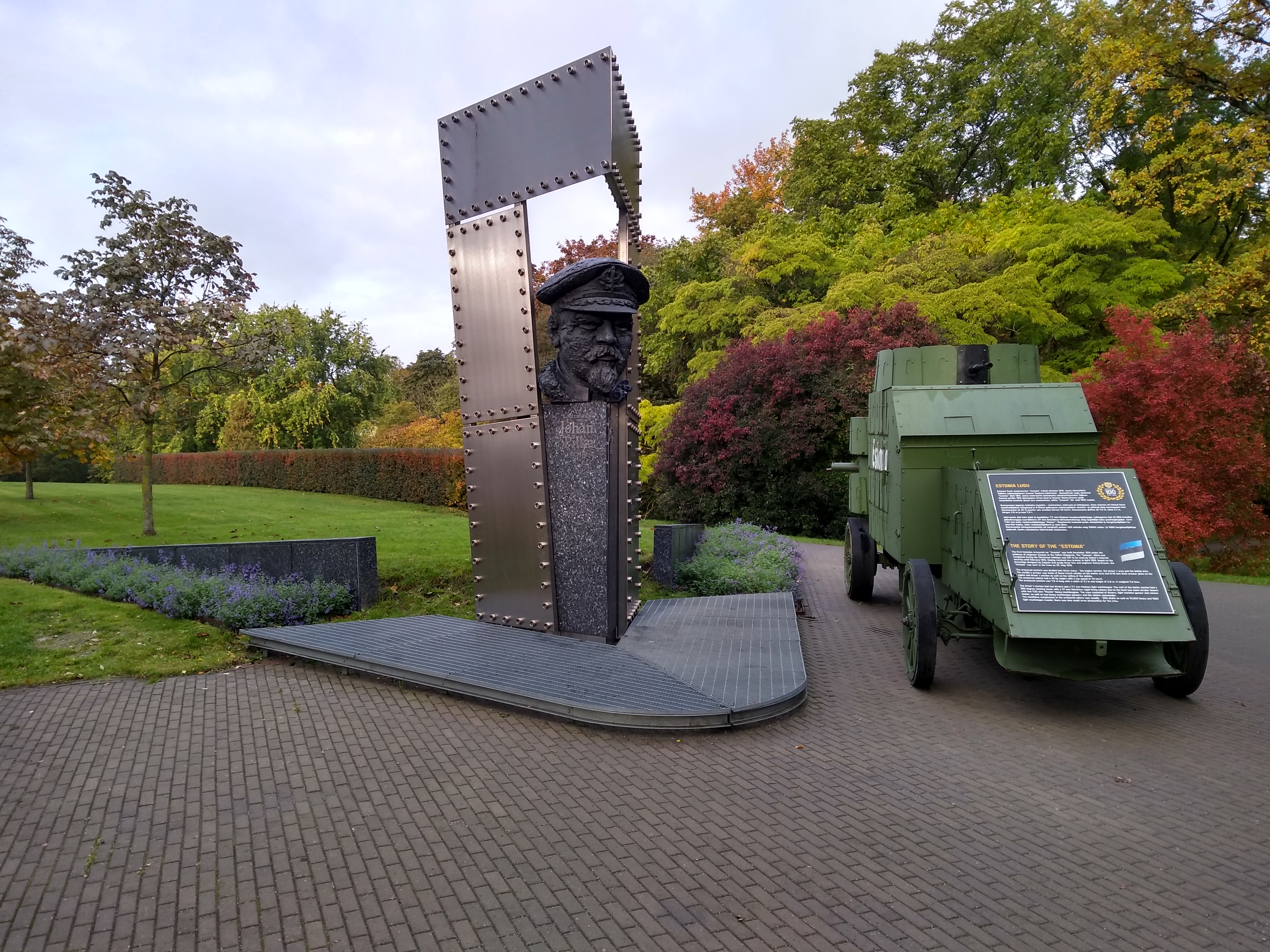
The monument to the Commander of the Estonian Navy in the Estonian War of Independence rear admiral Johan Pitka in Tallinn (with the replica of the first armoured car in the Estonian War of Independence - "Estonia")

In January 1920 to give recognition to his activities during the Great War, the KCMG Knight Commander of St. Michael and St. George was awarded to him by King George V. The Estonian government valued his contribution by awarding him the Cross of Liberty I/1. Pitka is also a recipient of the Latvian military Order of Lāčplēsis, 2nd class.

In 2009, Estonian officials and District of Fort St. James representatives dedicated a monument to Johan Pitka. Located in Spirit Square Park in Fort St. James, BC, Canada. This monument contains a time capsule to be opened upon the 100th anniversary of its placement.

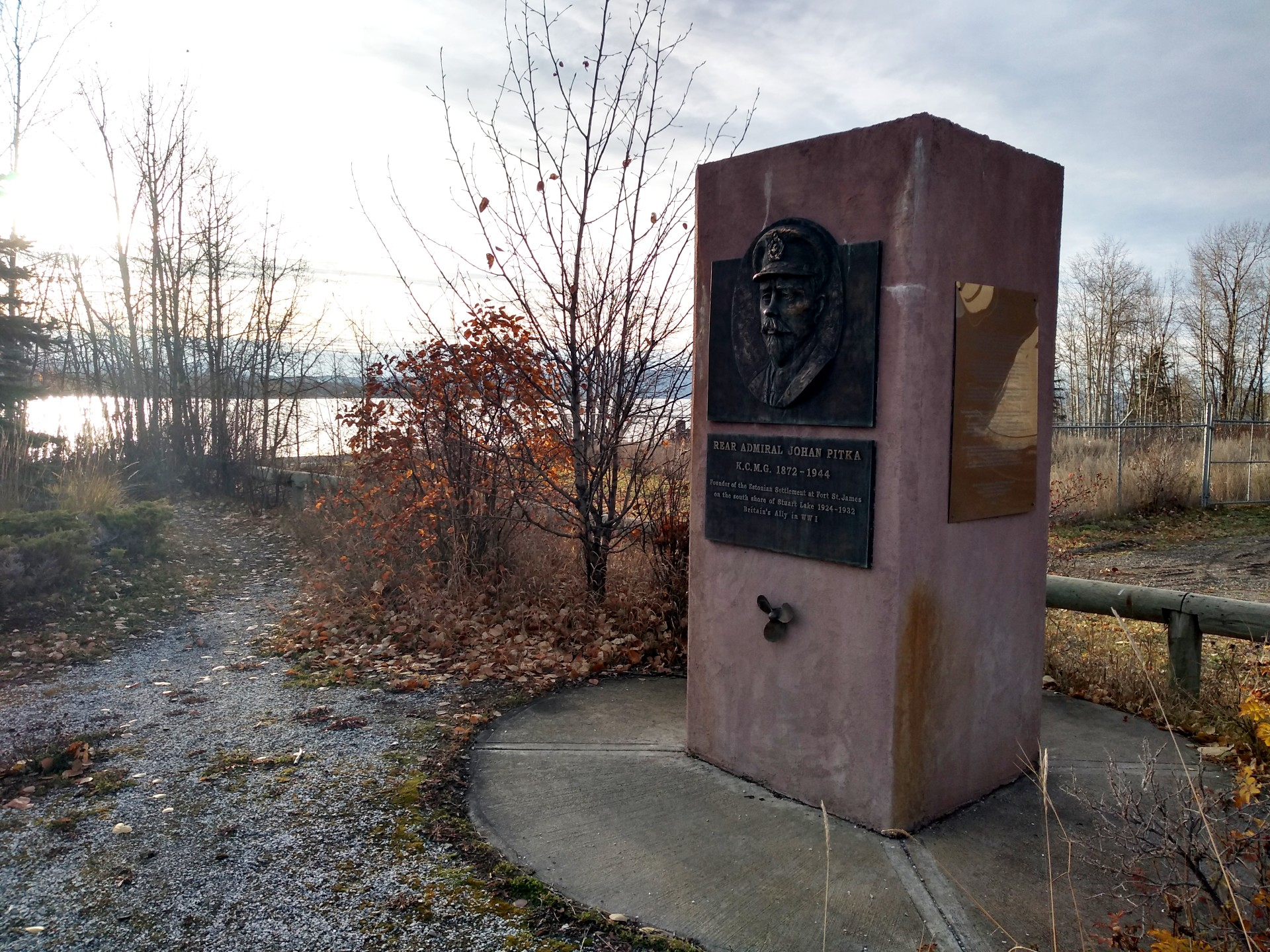
Located in Spirit Square Park in Fort St. James, BC, Canada, this monument commemorates Johan Pitka and his military service.

== Writings ==
Pitka was also a prolific author. He translated a book by Irving Cooper about fitness and health from English to Estonian in 1935 after he had returned from Canada. He also translated a spiritual work with a foreword by Helena Blavatsky. Pitka wrote about his years commanding the barque Lilly and also wrote his other memoirs in four volumes that were edited by Evald Past.

- Pitka, J., Minu Mälestused suure ilmasõja algusest Eesti vabadussõja lõpuni, Tallinna Eesti Kirjastus-Ühisus, 1921
- Pitka, J. Teed töelisele tervisele, tõlgitud inglise keelest, author Irving S. Cooper, koostõlkija Saima Smith, Eesti Ühistrükikoda, Tallinn, 1935
- Pitka, J., Minu Mälestused I, Laevandus, Kiirtrükk, Tallinn, 1937
- Pitka, J., Minu Mälestused II, Laevandus, Tallinn, Ilutrükk, Tartu, 1938.
- Pitka, J., Minu Mälestused III, Laevandus, Tallinn, Ilutrükk, Tartu, 1939.
- Pitka, J., Minu Mälestused IV, Orkaanis ja dûnglis, Vikerlane, Tallinn, Ilutrükk, Tartu, 1939.
- Pitka, J., My Formative Years, Master of barque Lilly 1896-1900, Booklocker, 2018, ISBN 9780986751011- an English translation of Pitka's four volume memoirs Minu Mälestused I-IV.
- Pitka, J., Väljavõtteid "Kuldsete õpetuste raamatust", avaldanud H.P. Blavatsky, eestitatud J. Pitka, Eesti Ühistrükikoda, Tallinn, 1939.
- Pitka, J., Minu Mälestused 1914-1920: Suure Ilmasõja algusest Eesti Vabadussõja lõpuni, Olion, Tallinna Raamatutrükikoda, 1993, [Reprint of his 1921 book.] ISBN 5450013221
- Pitka, J. Teed töelisele tervisele, tõlgitud inglise keelest, author Irving S. Cooper, koostõlkija Saima Smith, Nebadon, Ühiselu, Tallinn, 1994
- Pitka, J., Kuldsed aasta "Lillyga", Mats, Tallinna Raamatutrükikoda, 1998, ISBN 9985510399

== See also ==
- Freikorps in the Baltic
- List of people who disappeared
