= Jalgsema =

Village in Estonia

Coordinates: 59°05′N 25°54′E

- Village
- Interactive map of Jalgsema
- Country: Estonia
- County: Järva County
- Parish: Järva Parish
- Time zone: UTC+2 (EET)
  - Summer (DST): UTC+3 (EEST)

Jalgsema is a village in Järva Parish, Järva County, in north-central Estonia.

== Name ==
Jalgsema was attested in historical sources as Iolgesim in 1220, Jalxen in 1548, Jalxem in 1564, and Jalgsemast (in the elative case) in 1734. The first part of the toponym, jalg, genitive jala 'leg, foot', is probably related to the neighboring village name Jalalõpe. The ending -ma is apparently of later origin, from the 18th century, because earlier records do not support it. This casts doubt on Enn Tarvel's suggestion that the ending may refer to arable land.

== Notable people ==
The military commander Johan Pitka (1872–1944) was born in Jalgsema at the Terasaugu gamekeeper's house.
