= Richard Boyer =

Richard Boyer may refer to:

- Richard Boyer (broadcaster) (1891–1961), Australian broadcaster
- Richard O. Boyer (1903–1973), American journalist
- Rick Boyer (1943–2021), American author
- Richard Delmer Boyer (born 1958), American convicted murderer
