= Metstaguse =

Village in Estonia

- Village
- Location in Estonia
- Coordinates: 59°02′55″N 25°51′03″E
- Country: Estonia
- County: Järva County
- Municipality: Järva Parish

Population (2011 Census)
  - Total: 39

Metstaguse is a village in Järva Parish, Järva County in central Estonia. It is located just northwest of Järva-Jaani, the administrative centre of the municipality. As of the 2011 census, the settlement's population was 39.

Metstaguse is the location of Metstaguse knight manor (Metztacken), which was first mentioned in 1586. The modest one-storey wooden main building was constructed at the end of the 19th century.

Largest employer in the village is OÜ Metstaguse Agro, a milk and cereal producer.
