= Bouvier =

Bouvier may refer to:

== People ==
Bouvier, a French surname, is the last name of several notable people:

- Augustus Jules Bouvier, English artist
- Bertrand Bouvier (1929–2025), Swiss writer and translator
- Charles Bouvier, Swiss bobsledder
- Edith Bouvier, aunt of Jacqueline Kennedy Onassis; appeared in the documentary film Grey Gardens (1975)
- Eugène Louis Bouvier, French zoologist
- Hélène Bouvier, French mezzo-soprano
- Jacqueline Kennedy Onassis (née Bouvier), (1929–1994), the First Lady to John F. Kennedy, 35th president of the United States of America
- Jacqueline Pagnol (née Bouvier), (1920–2016), French actress and wife of author and filmmaker Marcel Pagnol
- Janet Lee Bouvier (1907–1989), mother of Jacqueline Kennedy Onassis and Lee Radziwill
- Jean-Baptiste Bouvier (1783–1854), French theologian and Bishop of Le Mans
- Jeanne Bouvier (1865–1964), a French textile worker and trade unionist
- John Bouvier (1787–1851), American jurist and compiler of famous law dictionary
- John Vernou Bouvier III ("Black Jack"), stockbroker and father of Jacqueline Kennedy Onassis and Lee Radziwill
- Lee Radziwill (née Bouvier) (1933–2019), sister of Jacqueline Kennedy Onassis
- Martín Bouvier (born 1992), Argentine footballer
- Nicolas Bouvier (1929–1998), Swiss writer and traveller
- Pierre Bouvier (born 1979), musician

== Fictional characters ==
- Anthony Bouvier, fictional character on the TV series Designing Women
- Pam Bouvier, fictional character (Bond girl) in the James Bond film Licence to Kill (1989)
- Bouvier is the last name of several fictional characters from the television series The Simpsons by Matt Groening:
  - Clancy Bouvier, Marge Simpson's deceased father
  - Jacqueline Ingrid Bouvier, Marge's mother
  - Ling Bouvier, Marge's niece and Selma's adopted daughter
  - Marge Simpson (née Bouvier)
  - Patty and Selma Bouvier, Marge's sisters
  - See also: Extended Bouvier family on The Simpsons

== Breeds of dog ==
- Bouvier Bernois (Bernese Mountain Dog)
- Bouvier des Ardennes
- Bouvier des Flandres

== Other uses ==
- Bouvier (grape), wine-grape variety grown primarily in Austria, Hungary and Slovenia
- Bouvier's Law Dictionary
- The Bouviers: Portrait of an American Family, a 1969 non-fiction book by John H. Davis
