= Jim Boyer =

Jim Boyer may refer to:

- Jim Boyer (umpire) (1909–1959), American baseball umpire
- Jim Boyer (audio engineer) (1951–2022), American audio engineer
