= Louis Boyer =

Louis Boyer may refer to:

- Louis Boyer (astronomer) (1901–1999), French astronomer
- Louis-Alphonse Boyer (1839–1916), Canadian merchant and political figure from Quebec
- Louis Boyer (merchant) (1795–1870), mason, merchant and land owner
- Louis Boyer (politician) (1921–2017), French politician

== See also ==
- Louis Bouyer (1913–2004), French Christian minister
