= Laurie Boyer =

American biomedical engineer and academic

Laurie A. Boyer
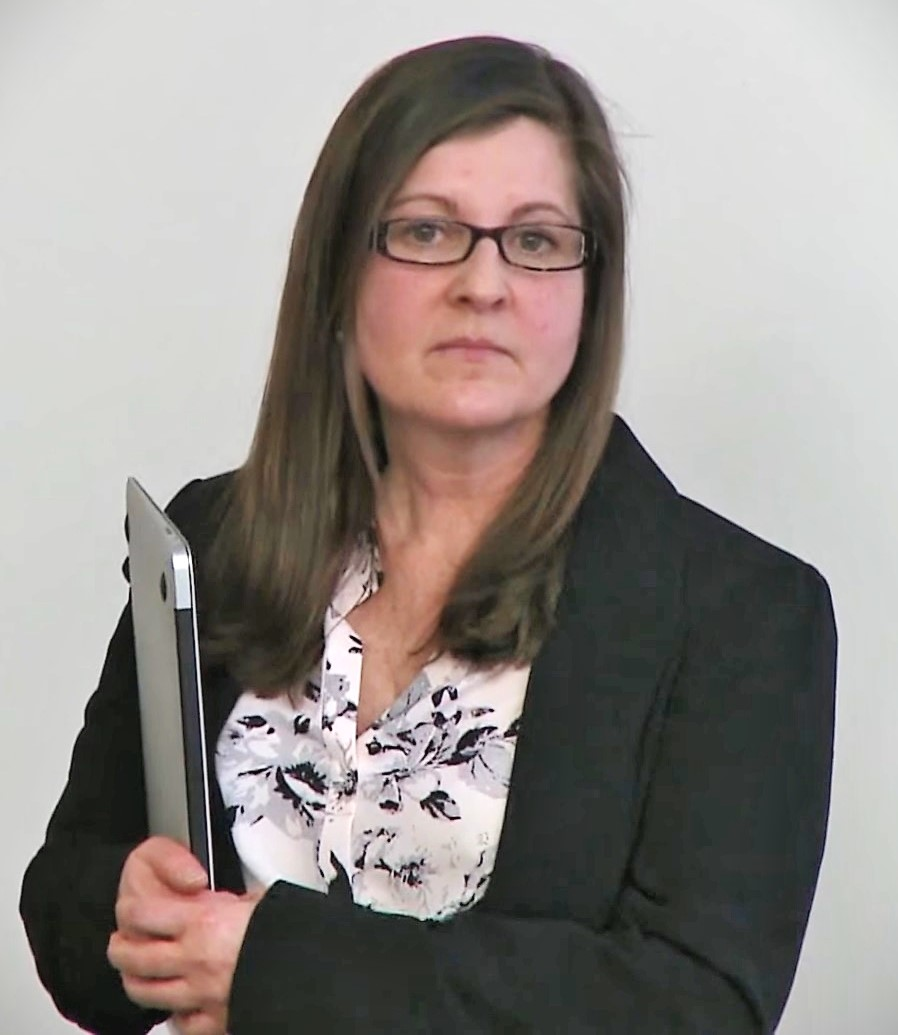
- Education: Framingham State University; University of Massachusetts Chan Medical School
- Scientific career
- Workplaces: Massachusetts Institute of Technology
- Thesis: Conserved features of chromatin remodeling enzymes : a dissertation (2000)

Laurie A. Boyer is an American biologist who is a Professor at the Massachusetts Institute of Technology. Her research focuses on the regulation of cell fate decisions and how faulty regulation leads to disease using human stem cells and mice as models.

== Early life and education ==
Boyer is from Western Massachusetts. She became interested in science and biology while in high school. She was an undergraduate student at Framingham State University where she studied biomedical sciences. She earned her PhD at the University of Massachusetts Chan Medical School, where she researched chromatin remodeling enzymes. Boyer was a postdoctoral researcher at the MIT Whitehead Institute.

== Research and career ==
Boyer focuses on how cells make decisions early in development to give rise to tissues and organs and how faulty regulation leads to disease with a focus on the heart. Boyer became the part of the Biology Department at MIT in 2007, and in 2015 she gained a title of an Associate Professor of Biological Engineering.

== Awards and honors ==
- 2006: Scientific American World's 50 Top Leaders in Research, Business or Policy
- 2007: Framingham State University Honorary Doctorate
- 2008: Pew Scholars Award in the Biomedical Sciences
- 2009: Smith Family Award for Excellence in Biomedical Science
- 2012: Irvin and Helen Sizer Career Development Award
- 2013: American Heart Association Innovative Research Award
- 2020: FLEXcyte 96 Research Grant

== Selected publications ==
- Laurie A Boyer; Tong Ihn Lee; Megan F Cole; et al. (23 September 2005). "Core transcriptional regulatory circuitry in human embryonic stem cells". Cell. 122 (6): 947–56. doi:10.1016/j.cell.2005.08.020. ISSN 0092-8674. PMC 3006442. PMID 16153702. Wikidata Q24322016.
- Laurie A Boyer; Kathrin Plath; Julia Zeitlinger; et al. (19 April 2006). "Polycomb complexes repress developmental regulators in murine embryonic stem cells". Nature. 441 (7091): 349–353. doi:10.1038/nature04733. ISSN 1476-4687. PMID 16625203. Wikidata Q29547274.
- Kundaje A; Meuleman W; Ernst J; et al. (19 February 2015). "Integrative analysis of 111 reference human epigenomes". Nature. 518 (7539): 317–30. doi:10.1038/nature14248. ISSN 1476-4687. PMC 4530010. PMID 25693563. Wikidata Q29615565.
