= Järva-Jaani =

Borough in Estonia

- Borough
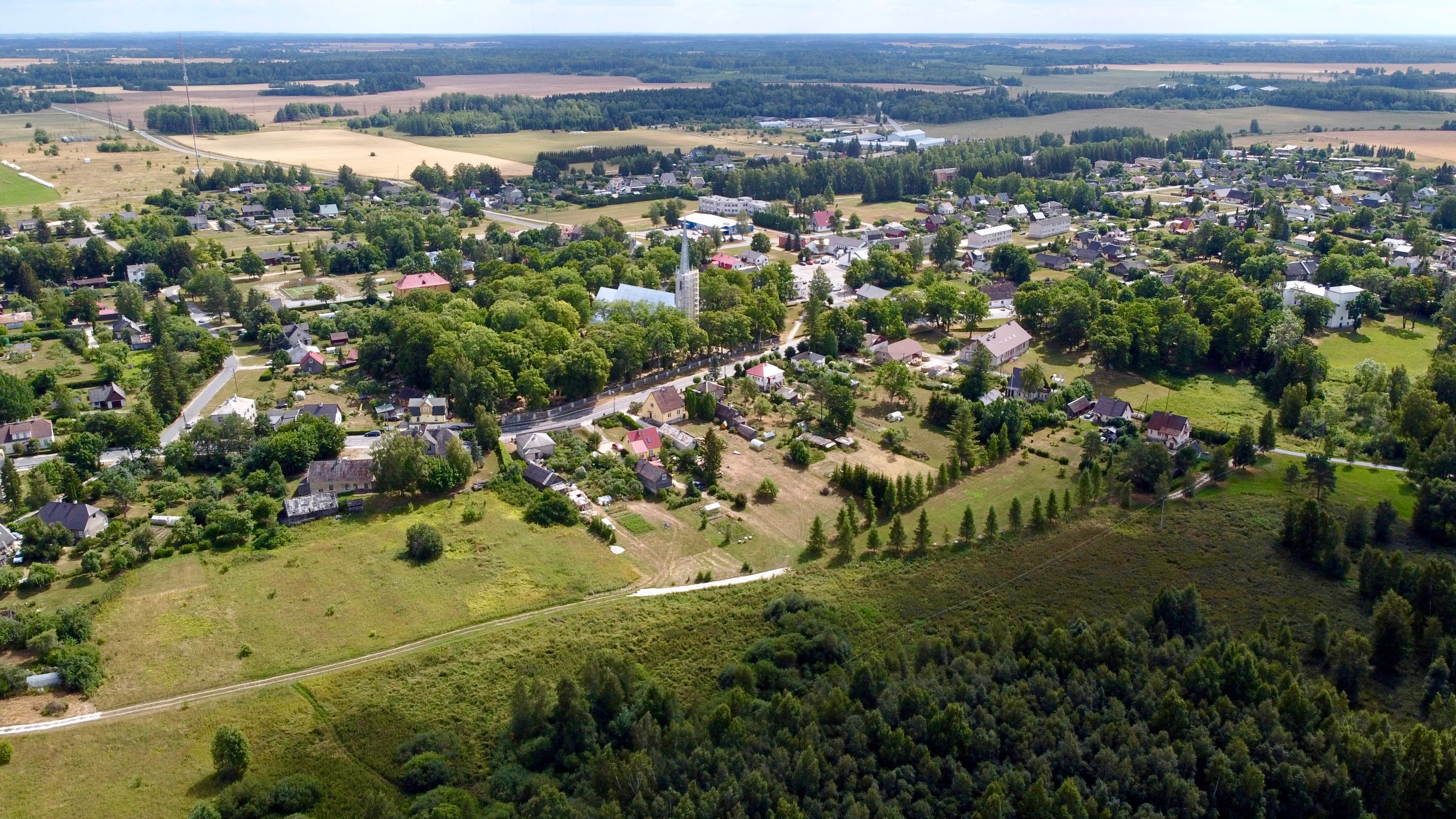
- The middle part of Järva-Jaani

- Location in Estonia
- Coordinates: 59°2′20″N 25°53′2″E
- Country: Estonia
- County: Järva County
- Municipality: Järva Parish

Drone video of Järva-Jaani, July 2021

Järva-Jaani (German: Sankt Johannis) is a borough (Estonian: alev) in Järva County, in Järva Parish, central Estonia. It was the administrative center of Järva-Jaani Parish.

== Notable people ==
- Eduard von Gebhardt (1838–1925), painter, was born in Järva-Jaani
