= Paul Boyer =

Paul Boyer may refer to:

- Paul Boyer (photographer) (1861–1908), French photographer
- Paul D. Boyer (1918–2018), American chemist and Nobel Prize winner
- Paul Boyer (historian) (1935–2012), American historian
- Paul Boyer (politician), American politician
- Paul Boyer, or sOAZ, (born 1994), French League of Legends player
- Paul Boyer (Slavist) (1864–1949), French slavist
