= Francis Godon =

Canadian Métis soldier (1924–2019)

Francis Godon (1924–2019) was a Canadian Métis soldier.

Born in Dunseith, North Dakota on 19 August 1924, Godon moved to Manitoba at age 5. He tried to enlist in the Canadian Army on three occasions but was rejected each time, only being accepted when on his fourth attempt he identified himself as French-Canadian rather than Métis. He shipped out to Europe as a member of the Royal Winnipeg Rifles. By 1944 he had attained the rank of corporal and participated in Operation Overlord. He was reported missing in action and was presumed dead, but was in fact a prisoner of war in a German labour camp. He spent 11 months in the camp before being liberated by American forces.

He received the French Legion of Honour medal in 2015 for his wartime service. After his death on 12 January 2019, his son Frank donated his uniform to the Juno Beach Centre.
