= Greg Boyer =

Greg Boyer or Gregory Boyer may refer to:

- Greg Boyer (musician) (born 1958), American trombonist
- Greg Boyer (water polo) (born 1958), American Olympic silver medalist in water polo
