= Bert Boyer =

American molecular biologist

Bert Boyer is an American molecular biologist who is the Professor of Molecular Biology for the Department of Biology and Wildlife at University of Alaska Fairbanks, Bob and Charlee Moore Endowed Professor, Director of Alaska Native Health Research, and OHSU Knight for the Cardiovascular Institute School of Medicine. He was instrumental in forming the Center for Alaska Native Health Research. Boyer's research group specifically focuses on genetic and environmental risk and prevention initiatives related to obesity and diabetes in Yup'ik Eskimos from Southwest Alaska.

== Education ==
In 1982, Boyer received a Bachelor of Arts degree from Texas Tech University, Lubbock, Texas. He then attended LSU Health Sciences Center New Orleans in New Orleans, Louisiana, where he obtained his Ph.D. for Physiology in 1988.

== Community-Based Participatory Research (CBPR) ==
Boyer's Community-based participatory research (CBPR) with the Yup'ik Eskimos, emphasizes the importance of collaboration with Alaskan Native community as equal partners in all phases of the research process with the goal of eliminating health disparities. Boyer and his colleagues have conducted a fifteen-year longitudinal study in rural Alaska, which involves about 2,000 Yup'ik Alaska Natives based in eleven communities around Alaska. Their research evaluates how the Native peoples subsistence style diet and physical activity may prevent chronic diseases, such as diabetes.

== Publications ==
- Grarup, N.; Moltke, I.; Andersen, M.K.; et al. (2018). "Identification of novel high-impact recessively inherited type 2 diabetes risk variants in Greenlandic Inuit". Diabetologia. 61: 2005. doi:10.1007/s00125-018-4659-2. PMC 6096637.
- Henderson, LM; Claw, KG; Woodahl, EL; et al. (2018). "P450 Pharmacogenetics in Indigenous North American Populations". J Pers Med. 8 (1): 9. doi:10.3390/jpm8010009. PMC 5872083.
- Koller, KR; Flanagan, CA; Day, GE; Patten, C; Umans, JG; Austin, MA; Hopkins, SE; Raindl, C; Boyer, B (2017). "High tobacco use prevalence with significant regional and sex differences in smokeless tobacco use among Western Alaska Native people: the WATCH study". Int J Circumpolar Health. 76 (1) 1398009. doi:10.1080/22423982.2017.1398009. PMC 5700538. PMID 29130421..
- Philip, J; Ryman, TK; Hopkins, SE; O'Brien, DM; Bersamin, A; Pomeroy, J; Thummel, KE; Austin, MA; Boyer, BB; Dombrowski, K (Nov 2017). "Bi-cultural dynamics for risk and protective factors for cardiometabolic health in an Alaska Native (Yup'ik) population". PLOS ONE. 12 (11) e0183451. Bibcode:2017PLoSO..1283451P. doi:10.1371/journal.pone.0183451. PMC 5665420. PMID 29091709..
- Au, NT; Ryman, T; Rettie, AE; Hopkins, SE; Boyer, BB; Black, J; Philip, J; Yracheta, J; Fohner, AE; Reyes, M; Thornton, TA; Austin, MA; Thummel, KE (Feb 2018). "Dietary Vitamin K and Association with Hepatic Vitamin K Status in a Yup'ik Study Population from Southwestern Alaska". Mol Nutr Food Res. 62 (3) 1700746: 3. doi:10.1002/mnfr.201700746. PMC 5803412. PMID 29094808..
- Au, NT; Reyes, M; Boyer, BB; Hopkins, SE; Black, J; O'Brien, D; Fohner, AE; Yracheta, J; Thornton, T; Austin, MA; Burke, W; Thummel, KE; Rettie, AE (2017). "Dietary and genetic influences on hemostasis in a Yup'ik Alaska Native population". PLOS ONE. 12 (4) e0173616. Bibcode:2017PLoSO..1273616A. doi:10.1371/journal.pone.0173616. PMC 5380313. PMID 28376131.
- Ryman, TK; Boyer, BB; Hopkins, SE; Philip, J; Thompson, B; Beresford, SAA; Thummel, KE; Austin, MA (2018). "Association between iq'mik smokeless tobacco use and cardiometabolic risk profile among Yup'ik Alaska Native people". Ethn Health. 23 (5): 488–502. doi:10.1080/13557858.2017.1280136. PMC 5796859. PMID 28116909.
- Lemas, DJ; Klimentidis, YC; Aslibekyan, S; Wiener, HW; O'Brien, DM; Hopkins, SE; Stanhope, KL; Havel, PJ; Allison, DB; Fernandez, JR; Tiwari, HK; Boyer, BB (2016). "Polymorphisms in stearoyl coa desaturase and sterol regulatory element binding protein interact with N-3 polyunsaturated fatty acid intake to modify associations with anthropometric variables and metabolic phenotypes in Yup'ik people". Mol Nutr Food Res. 60 (12): 2642–2653. doi:10.1002/mnfr.201600170. PMC 5148654. PMID 27467133..
- Aslibekyan, S; Vaughan, LK; Wiener, HW; Hidalgo, BA; Lemas, DJ; O'Brien, DM; Hopkins, SE; Stanhope, KL; Havel, PJ; Thummel, KE; Boyer, BB; Tiwari, HK (2016). "Linkage and association analysis of circulating vitamin D and parathyroid hormone identifies novel loci in Alaska Native Yup'ik people". Genes Nutr. 11 23. doi:10.1186/s12263-016-0538-y. PMC 4971612. PMID 27579147.
- O'Brien, DM; Thummel, KE; Bulkow, LR; Wang, Z; Corbin, B; Klejka, J; Hopkins, SE; Boyer, BB; Hennessy, TW; Singleton, R (2017). "Declines in traditional marine food intake and vitamin D levels from the 1960s to present in young Alaska Native women". Public Health Nutr. 20 (10): 1738–1745. doi:10.1017/S1368980016001853. PMC 5274583. PMID 27465921.
