= Martín Bouvier =

Argentine professional footballer

Personal information
- Full name: Juan Martín Bouvier
- Date of birth: 2 February 1992 (age 34)
- Place of birth: Luján, Argentina
- Height: 1.87 m (6 ft 2 in)
- Position: Centre-back

Team information
- Current team: Club Luján

Youth career
- Huracán

Senior career*
Years	Team	Apps	(Gls)
2012–2015	Huracán	2	(0)
2015	→ Deportivo Armenio (loan)	0	(0)
2015	→ San Lorenzo de Alem (loan)	25	(0)
2016–2019	Deportivo Español	44	(3)
2019–2021	UAI Urquiza	37	(1)
2022–	Club Luján	13	(1)
- * Club domestic league appearances and goals as of 08:13, 20 August 2022 (UTC)

Juan Martín Bouvier (born 2 February 1992) is an Argentine professional footballer who plays as a centre-back for Club Luján.

== Career ==
Bouvier started his career with Huracán. His two appearances for the club arrived in the 2012–13 Primera B Nacional campaign, appearing for the full duration of fixtures in October 2012 against Nueva Chicago and Olimpo. He remained for three further seasons without featuring. In January 2015, Bouvier was loaned to Deportivo Armenio. However, he returned to his parent club in February, prior to spending the rest of 2015 on loan with Torneo Federal A's San Lorenzo de Alem. Thirty appearances followed; twenty-nine starts. He received his first red card in April versus Andino.

In January 2016, Bouvier completed a move to Deportivo Español of Primera B Metropolitana. He scored his first senior goal versus Talleres on 28 October 2017. He remained until June 2019, having made forty-four appearances and scored three goals. After departing, the centre-back moved across the division to UAI Urquiza.

== Career statistics ==
As of 10 October 2020.

Appearances and goals by club, season and competition
Club	Season	League			Cup		League Cup		Continental		Other		Total	
Club	Season	Division	Apps	Goals	Apps	Goals	Apps	Goals	Apps	Goals	Apps	Goals	Apps	Goals
Huracán	2012–13	Primera B Nacional	2	0	0	0	—		—		0	0	2	0
Huracán	2013–14	Primera B Nacional	0	0	0	0	—		—		0	0	0	0
Huracán	2014	Primera B Nacional	0	0	0	0	—		—		0	0	0	0
Huracán	2015	Primera División	0	0	0	0	—		—		0	0	0	0
Huracán	Total		2	0	0	0	—		—		0	0	2	0
Deportivo Armenio (loan)	2015	Primera B Metropolitana	0	0	0	0	—		—		0	0	0	0
San Lorenzo (loan)	2015	Torneo Federal A	25	0	0	0	—		—		5 (Note: Appearance(s) in the Torneo Federal A play-offs)	0	30	0
Deportivo Español	2016	Primera B Metropolitana	5	0	0	0	—		—		0	0	5	0
Deportivo Español	2016–17	Primera B Metropolitana	1	0	0	0	—		—		0	0	1	0
Deportivo Español	2017–18	Primera B Metropolitana	23	1	0	0	—		—		0	0	23	1
Deportivo Español	2018–19	Primera B Metropolitana	15	2	0	0	—		—		0	0	15	2
Deportivo Español	Total		44	3	0	0	—		—		0	0	44	3
UAI Urquiza	2019–20	Primera B Metropolitana	11	0	0	0	—		—		0	0	11	0
Career total			82	3	0	0	—		—		5	0	87	3
