= Denise Boyer-Merdich =

American soccer player (born 1962)

Personal information
- Full name: Denise Marie Merdich
- Birth name: Denise Marie Boyer
- Date of birth: June 8, 1962 (age 64)
- Place of birth: San Diego County, California, U.S.
- Height: 5 ft 2 in (1.57 m)
- Position: Right winger

Youth career
- Tacoma Cozars

College career
Years	Team	Apps	(Gls)
1980–1984	Puget Sound Loggers		

International career
1985–1987	United States	7	(1)

Denise Marie Merdich (née Boyer; born June 8, 1962) is an American former soccer player who played as a right winger, making seven appearances for the United States women's national team.

== Career ==
Boyer-Merdich made her international debut for the United States in the team's inaugural match on August 18, 1985, in a friendly match against Italy. In total, she made seven appearances for the U.S. and scored one goal, earning her final cap on July 11, 1987, in a friendly match against Norway.

== Career statistics ==
=== International ===
United States
Year	Apps	Goals
1985	4	0
1987	3	1
Total	7	1

=== International goals ===
No.	Date	Venue	Opponent	Result	Competition
1	July 7, 1987	Blaine, Minnesota, United States	Canada	4–2	Friendly
