= Otto Boyer =

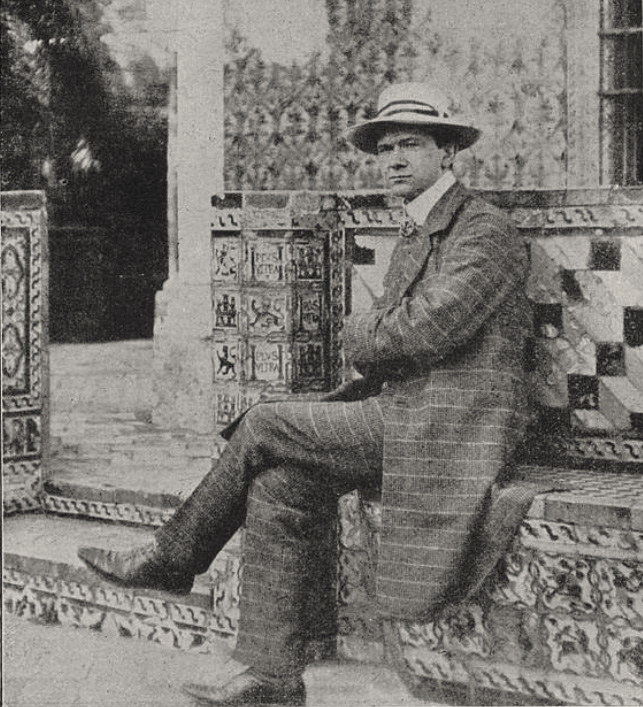
- Otto Boyer on a study trip to Granada c. 1910
- Born: June 21, 1874; Gelsenkirchen, German Empire
- Died: December 30, 1912 (aged 38); Jena, German Empire
- Education: Kunstakademie Düsseldorf (1894–1902)
- Known for: Genre painting, writing
- Awards: Civil Order of Alfonso XII (1906)

Otto Boyer (21 June 1874 – 30 December 1912) was a German genre painter and writer.

== Life and work ==
He was born in Gelsenkirchen. His father, also named Otto Boyer, was an engineer. After completing his secondary education, he enrolled at the Kunstakademie Düsseldorf, where he studied from 1894 to 1902. His first instructor was Heinrich Lauenstein. Later, he was accepted into the master class taught by Eduard von Gebhardt. This was followed by a series of study trips throughout the Mediterranean region and the Near East, including the Caucasus. In 1906, he participated in the National Exhibition of Fine Arts in Madrid and was awarded the Civil Order of Alfonso XII.

He was a member of the progressive artists' society, Malkasten, and the Freie Vereinigung Düsseldorfer Künstler. He also took part in the artistic and literary discussions that were held from 1909 to 1911 at the Rosenkränzchen (Rosary), a wine bar in Düsseldorf's old town.

His last home and studio was in the Oberkassel district, which he left to the painter Adolf Münzer when he moved to Weimar. There, he shared a house with a sculptor named Hugo Lange and joined the local literary society.

Shortly after, he died, aged only thirty-eight, in Jena. The cause of death was apparently not made public. His body was cremated, and the ashes placed in the local columbarium. The memorial speech was delivered by his friend, the novelist Wilhelm Hegeler. The estate sale was managed by the Deutsche Schillerstiftung.

In addition to his art, he was the author of a novel; Fuegos Fatuos. Fragment aus dem Leben eines fantasierenden Müßiggängers (Will-o'-the Wisps. A Fragment from the life of a fantasizing idler), issued by the Verlag von Schmitz und Olbert in 1910. It has not been translated or republished.

== Selected paintings ==
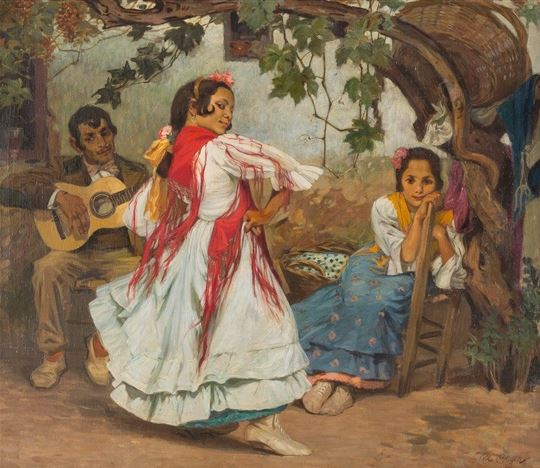
Spanish Dancer

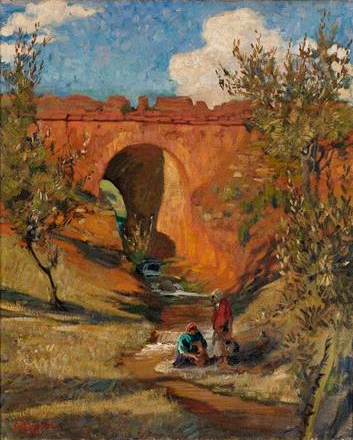
Mediterranean Landscape

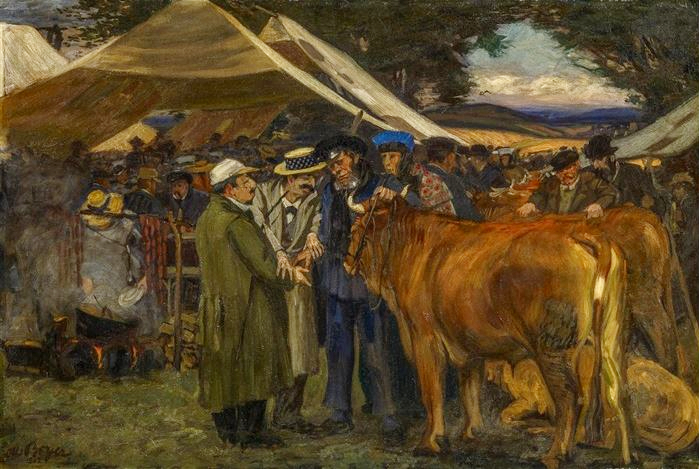
Trading Cows:
An Animal Market in the Hunsrück

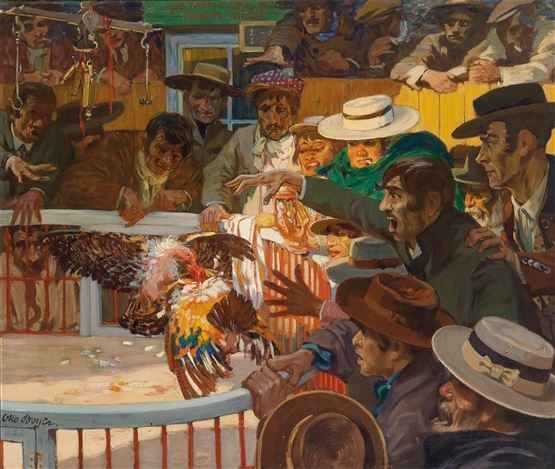
Cockfight in Sevilla
