= Ferdinand Boyer =

French politician

Ferdinand Boyer (French: [fɛʁdinɑ̃ bwaje]; 12 October 1823, Nîmes - 26 July 1885) was a French Legitimist politician. He was a member of the National Assembly from 1871 to 1876 and a member of the Chamber of Deputies from 1876 to 1885.
