= Jacques Boyer-Andrivet =

French politician (1918–1990)

Jacques Boyer-Andrivet (born on February 21, 1918, in Saint-Pey-de-Castets — June 8, 1990 in Saint-Pey-de-Castets), was a French politician and senator from Gironde.

== Local mandates ==
- 1947 — 1949 : municipal councilor of Saint-Pey-de-Castets
- 1977 — 1983 : municipal councilor of Castillon-la-Bataille
- 1949 — 1953 : Mayor of Saint-Pey-de-Castets
- 1953 — 1959 : Mayor of Saint-Pey-de-Castets
- 1959 — 1965 : Mayor of Saint-Pey-de-Castets
- 1965 — 1971 : Mayor of Saint-Pey-de-Castets
- 1971 — 1977 : Mayor of Castillon-la-Bataille
- 1970 — 1976 : general councilor of the canton of Castillon-la-Bataille
- 1976 — 1982 : general councilor of the canton of Castillon-la-Bataille
- 1982 — 1988 : general councilor of the canton of Castillon-la-Bataille
- 1988 — June 8, 1990: general councilor of the canton of Castillon-la-Bataille

== Parliamentary mandates ==
- February 10, 1966 — April 2, 1967: member of the 9th constituency of the Gironde
- May 8, 1967 — May 30, 1968: member of the 9th constituency of the Gironde
- September 26, 1971 — October 1, 1980: senator from Gironde
- February 21, 1987 — October 1, 1989: senator from Gironde

== Books ==
- Regards sur la Gironde
