= Robert M. Boyar =

American physician (1937–1978)

- Robert M. Boyar
- Born: March 10, 1937; New York
- Died: November 27, 1978 (aged 41); Dallas, Texas
- Occupations: physician, endocrinologist
- Known for: neuroendocrine studies of puberty

Robert Martin Boyar (March 10, 1937, New York – November 27, 1978, Dallas, Texas) was a physician and endocrinologist known for his studies of the neuroendocrinology of puberty.

== Early years and education ==
Boyar received his MD from Albert Einstein College of Medicine, Bronx, New York, 1962. He was a Navy physician during the Vietnam War, and on the medical staff of Montefiore Medical Center. For 2½ years he was Associate Professor of Internal Medicine, University of Texas Southwestern Medical School, Dallas.

== Scientific discoveries ==
Boyar is best known for his studies of gonadotropin secretion in puberty. An American physiologist, Ernst Knobil, discovered that the anterior pituitary produces pulses of Luteinizing hormone at about hourly intervals. The luteinizing hormone pulses are the consequence of pulsatile gonadotropin releasing hormone secretion by the hypothalamus into the pituitary portal circulation that, in turn, is the result of an oscillator or signal generator in the central nervous system (the "gonadotropin releasing hormone pulse generator"). Boyar demonstrated that in children approaching puberty the Luteinizing Hormone pulses occur only during sleep. This sleep related gonadotropin secretion initiates testosterone secretion in boys and estradiol secretion in girls, which ultimately result in the clinical characteristics associated with human puberty. Some investigators have attributed the onset of puberty to a resonance of oscillators in the brain. By this mechanism, the gonadotropin pulses that occur during sleep in puberty represent beats.

== Bibliography ==
- Sizonenko, PC. Role of sex steroids during development—integration. in Bourguignon, Jean Pierre & Tony M. Plant. The Onset of Puberty in Perspective: Proceedings of the 5th International Conference on the Control of the Onset of Puberty, Held in Liège, Belgium, 26–28 September 1999. Elsevier. Amsterdam & New York 2000. ISBN 0-444-50296-3 pp 299–306.
- Vilaplana, J; Madrid, JA; Sánchez-Vázquez, J; Campuzano, A; Cambras, T; Díez-Noguera, A (1995). "Influence of period length of light/dark cycles on the body weight and food intake of young rats". Physiology & Behavior. 58 (1): 9–13. doi:10.1016/0031-9384(95)00021-A. PMID 7667433. S2CID 43118869.
