= Merle Boyer =

American modernist art jeweler

Merle Newport Boyer (9 May 1920 – 29 Aug 2009) was an American modernist studio art jeweler and sculptor, as well as inventor, machinist, teacher and mentor.

== Life ==
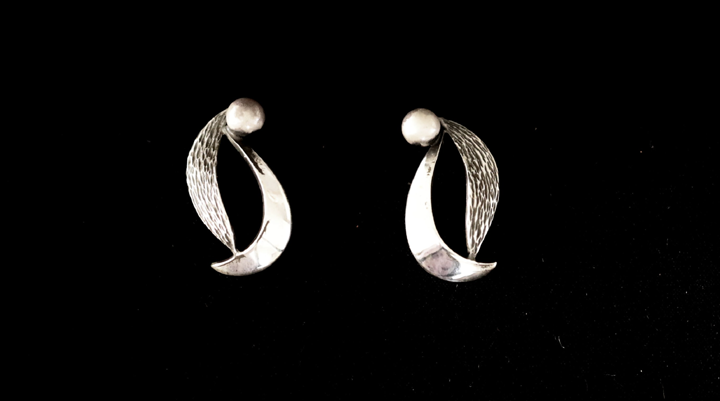
Hand-wrought Sterling Silver Earrings with Pearls, 1950s. Hatsue Higa Collection.

Boyer was born in Portland, Oregon. He graduated from Bradley Polytechnic Institute in Peoria, Illinois, where he took courses in horology, engraving and jewelry design before moving to territorial Honolulu in 1940. There he began working for C. G. Benny as a watchmaker and engraver. He studied at the Honolulu Academy of Arts School, he presented his work in Academy-sponsored shows, exhibitions and demonstrations throughout the war years.

In 1949 and 1950 he participated in juried shows sponsored by the Honolulu Academy of Arts, winning recognition for his work in sculpture.

Boyer opened his first jewelry studio on Fort St. in downtown Honolulu in 1950, where he produced hand-wrought contemporary pieces in gold and silver under the name M.N. Boyer.

He was active in Hawai`i's craft and art community throughout the 1950's, serving as President and Vice President of the Hawaii Craft Association, and teaching courses in jewelry at the Honolulu Academy of Arts School.

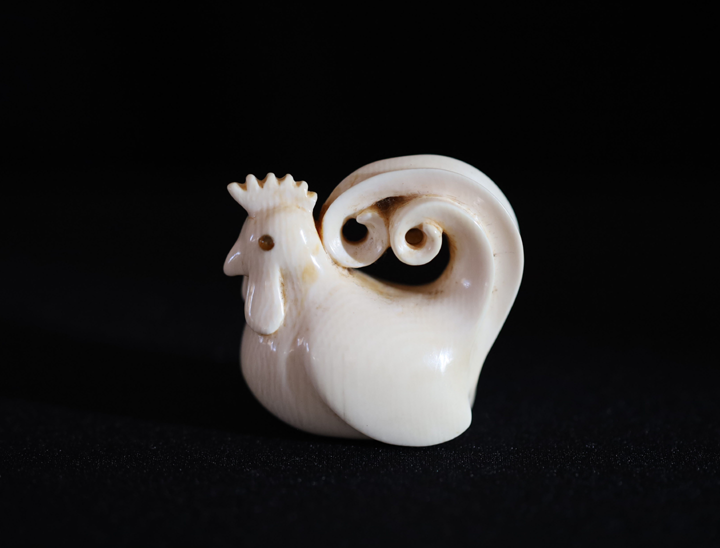
Netsuke-inspired, hand-carved ivory pendant, 1990s. Hatsue Higa Collection.

Boyer Jewelers opened on Ke`eaumoku St. in 1956. He continued to produce custom pieces while developing original designs for the growing tourist market in Hawai`i. He moved his business to a one man operation in 1974, working from Young Street in Honolulu. He retired his business in 1984. Boyer continued to create works for friends, family and loyal clients until 2008.

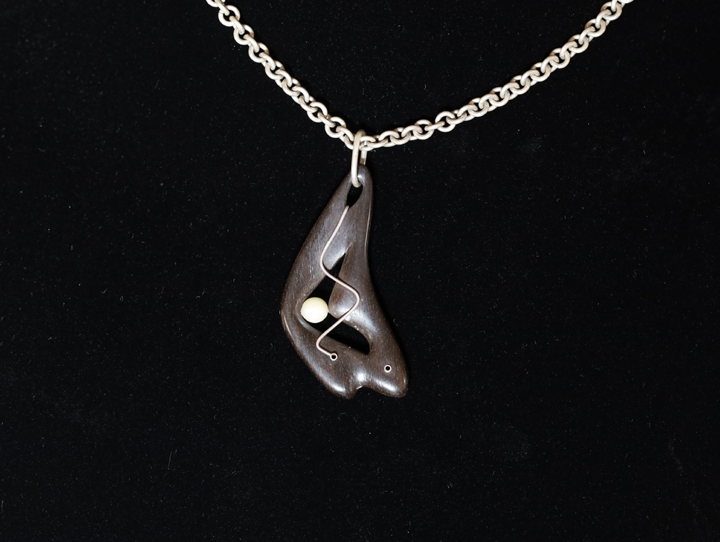
Ebony pearl and silver pendant, 1955. Walker Art Center, exhibit on paper.

In the 1990s Boyer returned to sculpture. Spending several months a year traveling throughout the US and in Canada, he created works on two scales. Inspired by Japanese netsuke, he carved dozens of small wearable art pieces in ivory and wood. An equal number of larger scale works in stone reflected his interest in abstract shapes and complex curves, as well as a lifelong interest with animal forms.

== Modernist Jeweler ==
Boyerʻs pieces incorporated themes and techniques of the modernist studio art jewelry movement. He worked with a wide range of materials from precious metals to found bits of shell, stones and wood. He created works in gold and silver, precious and semi-precious stones, ivory and ebony, as well a variety of native Hawaiian woods, nuts and coral. Duane Preble, a University of Hawaii art history professor, notes the "highly sculptural" setting in a contemporary piece featured in his Art Forms.

Pieces using silver and baroque pearl and black coral are among his most widely circulated. Boyer used a variety of marks. Mid century pieces may be marked: Boyer, Hawaii, or Sterling, alone or in combination.

During the 1950ʻs and into the 1960ʻs Boyer participated in exhibitions highlighting the mid-century modernist work of studio jewelers, to include the American Jewelry and Related Objects in Huntington, West Virginia. and its subsequent traveling exhibition; the National Decorating Arts-Ceramics Exhibition in Wichita (the Wichita National); Fiber-Clay-Metal at the St. Paul Gallery and School of Art, St. Paul, MN; the Walker exhibition on paper, presented through Design Quarterly; and the Contemporary Craftsmen of the Far West at the Museum of Contemporary Crafts, NY in 1961, and its subsequent traveling show the following year.

His original pieces were sold in venues such as the John Young Gallery in Waikiki, where he took proprietorship in 1959, and Pocketbook Man at the Ala Moana Shopping Center.

His approach to his art is featured in the 1969 KHET TV special, “Metals,” part of the PBS series, Directions in Design.

His work was included in the 2005 show at the Honolulu Academy of Arts entitled, Jewelry of Hawaiʻi: Art and artifice in Paradise, curated by Carol Anne Dickson.

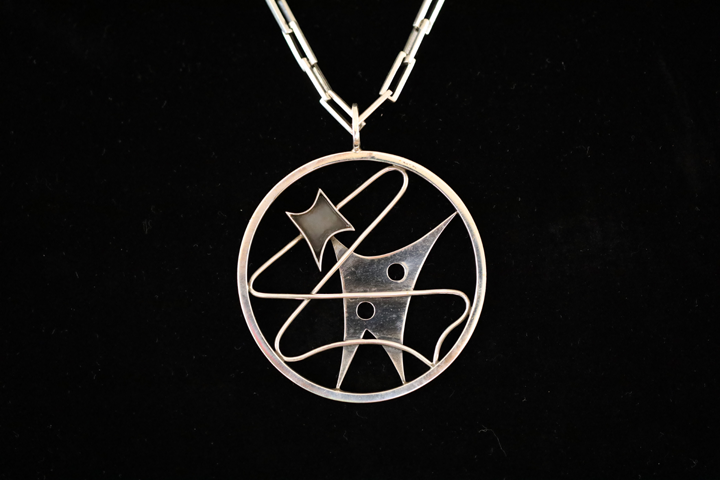
Hand-wrought silver pendant and chain. Hatsue Higa Collection.

== Exhibitions ==
1942: Oct 18-Nov 7, Honolulu Academy of Arts.

1943: Apr 13-May 2, Modern Jewelry and Metal Objects, Honolulu Academy of Arts.

1943: Oct 19-Nov 14, Juried Craft Exhibit, Honolulu Academy of Arts

1949: Mar 3-Mar 16, Juried Art Show; Honolulu Academy of Arts, Best sculpture, “Bird.”

1950: Feb 2-26, “Artists of Hawaii”, juried art show, Honolulu Academy of Arts; Honorable Mention - sculpture, “Mother and Child.”

1952: Mar 6-Apr 27, “Art in America Today”, Honolulu Academy of Art.

1953: “The Craftsmen Fair,” Honolulu Craftsmen Association.

1954: 9th National Decorating Arts-Ceramics Exhibition, Wichita Art Association, Wichita, KS.

1955: Walker Arts Center “Exhibition on Paper”. Design Quarterly 33 p. 17.

1955: Feb 6-27, 2nd American Jewelry and Related Objects, Huntington Galleries, Huntington W. VA.

1955: Fiber-Clay-Metal, St. Paul Gallery and School of Art, St. Paul, Minn.

1955, 1956, 1957: One Man Show; Library of Hawaii, Honolulu.

1956: John Young Gallery, Honolulu, HI.

1956-57: 2nd Exhibition of American Jewelry and Related Objects, traveling exhibition.

1961: Contemporary Craftsmen of the Far West; Museum of Contemporary Crafts, NY.

1962: Contemporary Craftsmen of the Far West, traveling exhibition:

Rochester Memorial Gallery, New York

Cincinnati Art Institute

Des Moines Art Center, Iowa

Museum of History and Industry, Seattle, Washington

1973: Daisy Gallery, Honolulu, Hawaii.

1973: May 1–3, Honolulu Academy of Arts

2005-2006: Oct 28-Feb 13, Jewelry of Hawaii: Art and Artifice in Paradise, Honolulu Academy of Arts.
