= G. Bruce Boyer =

Fashion journalist (born 1941)

G. Bruce Boyer (born 1941) is an American journalist who was the fashion editor for Town & Country. Often cited as an authority on men's fashion, he was formerly fashion editor for GQ and Esquire. Before his career in menswear journalism, Boyer studied English literature at Moravian College and holds a graduate and master's degree in the subject. He has also worked as an English literature professor for seven years.

== Bibliography ==
- Elegance: A Guide to Quality in Menswear (Norton, 1985)
- Eminently Suitable (Norton, 1990)
- Fred Astaire Style (Assouline, 2004)
- Rebel Style (Assouline, 2006)
- Gary Cooper – Enduring Style (PowerHouse Books, 2011)
- True Style: The History & Principles of Classic Menswear (Basic Books, 2015)
