= India Boyer =

American architect

India Boyer (1907–1998) was an American architect who was the first woman to pass Ohio's architectural licensing exam. She also worked as head of the U.S. Army Corps of Engineers' architecture department.

== Early life and education ==
India Boyer was born on June 27, 1907, to Ethel and Calvin Boyer in Shelby County, Ohio. She was named after India Schoaff, a family friend. India's mother was the first woman to serve on the Perry Township Board of Education, while her father was an agriculturalist. She had two brothers, Ralph and Howard, one of whom became an engineer and the other a metallurgist. In 1925, India graduated as valedictorian of her class at Pemberton High School and enrolled in the Ohio State University's Department of Architecture in 1926 along with six other women. Boyer was surprised to learn that military training was a requirement of the architectural program, but she refused to participate in it.

Boyer's fellow students were cool towards her at first, but her perseverance earned their respect and eventually they warmed up enough to lend a hand with a critical design project towards the end of her time in the program. However, serious obstacles remained: at one point she learned that she was not eligible to take part in a competitive examination that allowed the winner to study architecture in France over the summer. She protested her exclusion and was told that the reason for it was that she "might win and there were no facilities for women there."

During her junior and senior year, she worked for local architect Joseph Bradford. She graduated in 1930 along with 11 architects with Boyer being the only woman.

== Career ==
The Great Depression struck just as Boyer entered the job market and she struggled to make a career in architecture. She was eventually hired by the U.S. Army Corps for Engineers where she worked on navigation and flood control projects, including the construction of the Beachmont levy in Cincinnati. In 1939, she was promoted to head of the Corps of Engineers' architecture department, a position she held for seven years. During World War II, she was involved in designing buildings for wartime needs, including hospitals, airports, supply depots, warehouses, and housing.

In 1941, she made history as the first woman in Ohio to sit and pass the state architecture exam. After four more years with the Corps of Engineers, Boyer and colleagues Robert C. Vogt and William J. Ivers resigned and founded the architectural firm of Vogt, Ivers and Associates in Cincinnati, Ohio. Despite not being included in the firm's name, India became head of the firm and found herself up against tough competition from all-male practices. Boyer's interests ranged from commercial to industrial, recreational, educational buildings, including Elmwood Place School and the Shawnee Park. During this time, the Ryerson Steel Company was expanding and Boyer helped with their architectural plans.

In 1946, Boyer became the first female member of the Cincinnati chapter of the American Institute of Architects (AIA).

== Later life ==
Boyer suffered a heart attack in 1975 and as a consequence had to retire early, although she continued to work as a consultant. Boyer received the YMCA Women of Achievement award and the Distinguished Alumna Award from the Ohio State University College of Engineering in 1983. In 1994 a group of women who considered her a role model established the India Boyer Guild of Women in Architecture in her honor. She died in Cincinnati on February 9, 1998, at the age of 90.

== Papers ==
Boyer's architectural drawings and archives are held at the University of Cincinnati's College of Design, Architecture, Art, and Planning Library.
