= Todd Ducharme =

Canadian judge

Todd Ducharme is a Canadian judge. In 2004, he was the first Métis to be appointed to the Ontario Superior Court of Justice.

== Background ==
He received a Bachelor of Arts degree from McGill University, a Master of Arts in Political Science degree from Yale University, a Bachelor of Law degree in 1986 from the University of Toronto and a Master of Laws degree in 1991 from Yale Law School.
