= Seliküla =

Village in Estonia

- Village
- Location within Estonia
- Coordinates: 59°05′N 25°50′E
- Country: Estonia
- County: Järva County
- Parish: Järva Parish
- Time zone: UTC+2 (EET)
  - Summer (DST): UTC+3 (EEST)

Seliküla is a village in Järva Parish, Järva County in northern-central Estonia.
