= Andre Boyer =

Andre Boyer may refer to:

- Andre Boyer (actor), Japanese-born American film and television actor
- Andre Boyer (poker player), French-Canadian poker player
