= Rick Boyer =

American writer (1943–2021)

- Born: Richard Lewis Boyer; October 13, 1943; Evanston, Illinois, U.S.
- Died: January 19, 2021 (aged 77)
- Education: Denison University; University of Iowa (MFA)
- Occupation: Writer
- Writing career
- Genre: Crime fiction
- Notable awards: Edgar Award (1983)

Richard Lewis Boyer (13 October 1943 – 19 January 2021) was an American writer, best known for series of crime novels featuring Charlie "Doc" Adams, a dental surgeon in New England. His debut novel Billingsgate Shoal received the Edgar Award for best novel in 1983. In 1981, Boyer originated the Places Rated Almanac, a ranking of the country's 333 metropolitan areas according to the most important factors that influence the quality of life: climate, cost of living, jobs, arts, recreation, health care and environment, education, transportation, and crime. The Places Rated Almanac was updated with new editions throughout the 1990s.

Boyer was born in Evanston, Illinois. He majored in English at Denison University and earned an MFA in creative writing at the University of Iowa, studying under Kurt Vonnegut. Boyer worked as a high school teacher, a sales representative for publishing company and taught English at Western Carolina University until his retirement in 2008.

Boyer died on January 19, 2021, after a long battle with Alzheimer's Disease, at the age of 77.

== Bibliography ==
=== Doc Adams novels ===
- Billingsgate Shoal (1982)
- The Penny Ferry (1984)
- The Daisy Ducks (1986)
- Moscow Metal (1987)
- The Whale's Footprints (1988)
- Gone to Earth (1990)
- Yellow Bird (1991)
- Pirate Trade (1994)
- The Man Who Whispered (1998)

=== Other works ===
- The Giant Rat of Sumatra (1976)
- A Sherlockian Quartet (1999); short story collection
- Mzungu Mjinga: Swahili for Crazy White Man (2004)
- Buck Gentry (2005)
- The Quintessential Sherlock Holmes (2008) (His last published work)
