= Kevin O'Toole (bodybuilder) =

Canadian bodybuilder (born 1965)

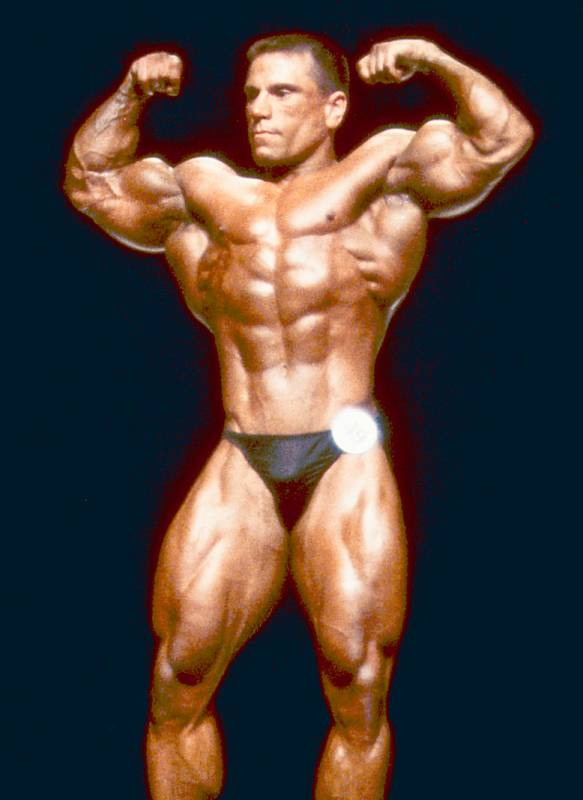
Kevin O'Toole at the 1996 North American Bodybuilding Championships

Kevin O'Toole (born May 24, 1965 in Vancouver, British Columbia) is a Canadian bodybuilder.

== Background ==
O'Toole is of Métis and Irish background and grew up in the cities of New Westminster and North Vancouver, British Columbia.

O'Toole, a self-identified Métis, has proven his Métis ancestry and is also widely recognized as Métis in the world of body building. His success on the National and International level makes his Métis status recognizable over a large population.

In his childhood, O'Toole played hockey up to the Midget 'A' level. Becoming inspired by the Arnold Schwarzenegger movie Pumping Iron, and already a weight training enthusiast, O'Toole was encouraged to compete in bodybuilding because of his impressive genetics. O'Toole would compete in two weight divisions throughout his career, middleweight (154.25 lbs to 176.25 lbs) and light-heavy weight (over 176.25lbs to 198.25 lbs). The extra weight seemed to pay off as O'Toole would win three championships when competing as a light-heavy weight.

A late starter, he entered his first competition, a novice show known as the Gator's Classic, in 1992, and won the middleweight class, tying for the overall - despite reportedly arriving so late he did not even have time to put on his bronzer. The following year, he earned his BCRPA Fitness Knowledge certification and a BCRPA Weight Room Instructor certificate. In 1994, O'Toole competed at the British Columbia Bodybuilding Championships where a scoring error gave the initial light heavyweight class win to another competitor. This decision was reversed by the organization a few weeks later, but only the class win could be reversed and not the overall competition, which all those present including guest poser Dennis Newman had assumed would go to O'Toole

O'Toole entered the last-ever Western Canada Bodybuilding Championships the following year and won the Light Heavyweight as well as the Overall competitions. In 1996, he competed in the Canadian Bodybuilding Championships, placing second in the light heavyweights, but went on two weeks later to compete in the North American Championships, easily winning the light heavyweight title. This made him the second man ever to win both the overall Western Canada championship and a weight class win at the North American championship (the other being fellow British Columbian Franco Cavaleri).

Unwilling to engage in heavy drug use to put on the extra mass to compete as a professional, O'Toole retired from bodybuilding competition after the 1996 North American championships and began pursuing a career as a personal trainer. O'Toole's physique remains notable in the bodybuilding world because of his symmetry and aesthetics, which have been compared to Shawn Ray and Mike Mentzer. Today, O'Toole owns and operates KO Fitness, a facility located in his home town of North Vancouver, where he continues his profession as a personal trainer.

In 1998, he began training with British Columbia mixed martial arts pioneers, Chris Franco, Lance Gibson, and their World Class Team. O'Toole placed 1st, in his Submission Wrestling Bracket, at the 1999 'Fireball Challenge' (formerly the BC Championships).

== Contest history ==
- 1992: Gator's Classic Middleweight Championship, and tied for Overall Champion
- 1994: British Columbia Light Heavyweight Champion (lost the overall winner due to a scoring error)
- 1995: Western Canadian Light Heavyweight and Overall Champion
- 1996: North American Light Heavyweight Champion
- 1999: Light-Heavyweight Champion, 'Fireball Submission Wrestling
