= Rick Rivet =

Metís artist from Canada

- Born: Richard James Rivet; 1949 (age 76–77); Aklavik, Northwest Territories, Canada
- Education: MFA University of Saskatchewan (1985)
- Known for: Mixed media, Painting
- Awards: Eiteljorg Fellowship (1999)
- Website: http://www.rickrivet.ca/

Rick Rivet (born 1949 in Aklavik, Northwest Territories) is a Sahtu–Métis painter living in Canada.

== Background and education ==
Rivet's family lived both in the country and in town at Aklavik, which was a Métis trading center. Métis have a specific culture with First Nations and European roots. He began school in Aklavik at age seven.

Rivet earned four degrees: his Bachelor of Arts from the University of Alberta in 1972; his Bachelor of Fine Arts from the University of Victoria in 1980; his Master of Fine Arts from the University of Saskatchewan in 1985, and Bachelor of Education from the University of Saskatchewan in 1986.

== Artwork ==
His art is deeply influenced by ideas of fusion and hybridity of cultures. He works primarily in acrylic on canvas in a style he has referred to as "an expressionist/primitivist approach." In 1999, he was awarded with a Eiteljorg Contemporary Art Fellowship. In 2023, Rivet presented a one-person show, Journeys, Mounds and the Metaphysical, at the IAIA Museum of Contemporary Native Arts.

== Collections and public art ==
Rivet's permanent public art mural, Millenium Mural, is installed at the David S. Strong Building at the Univerysity of Victoria, and other works of his are held in the permanent collection of the Maltwood Museum and Art Gallery, University of Victoria, Victoria, B.C. Rivet's work is held in the permanent collection of the Museum of Fine Art, Boston.
