= Katherine Boyer =

Canadian Métis artist

- Born: Regina, Saskatchewan, Canada
- Education: University of Regina; University of Manitoba
- Known for: Sculpture, printmaking and beadwork
- Website: katherineboyerart.com

Katherine Boyer is a Métis artist, whose multidisciplinary practice focuses primarily on the mediums of sculpture, printmaking and beadwork. She was born and raised in Regina, Saskatchewan, but currently resides in Winnipeg, Manitoba—a location that has had a direct influence on her current artistic practice.

As an artist of Métis ancestry, Boyer's personal connection to the traditional narratives and practices of her Indigenous culture are continually articulated within her work. The combination of these complex historical narratives coupled with an investigation of personal familial stories join together in shaping Boyer's research and artistic practice, as she explores themes of place and identity.

== Early life and education ==
In 2010, Boyer received her Bachelor of Fine Arts at the University of Regina, and she proceeded to complete her MFA at the University of Manitoba in 2018. Over the course of her educational journey, Boyer also worked as the gallery and collections coordinator of the First Nations University of Canada. While maintaining this position, Boyer organized several symposiums, and in 2015 she aided in the implementation of Performing Turtle Island: Fluid Identities and Community Continuities—a national symposium focused on investigating the connection between Indigenous theatre and performance and Indigenous identity and community health.

== Career ==
Dedicated to the investigation and contemplation of Métis visual culture, Boyer explores her concepts through various mediums. Her contemporary beading practice is rooted in the traditions of Indigenous culture and has also extended toward feminist contemplations of agency for Indigenous women in craft — a subject that was highlighted in the exhibition Material Girls, Dunlops Art Gallery, which toured nationally across Canada in 2015, including venues such as Rodman Hall Art Centre at Brock University, and Contemporary Calgary. For Boyer, the commitment she devotes to the labour-intensive process of beading is motivated by the connection it evokes with her familial memories; it is a practice of care and connection that has been shared among generations of women in her family.

More recently, as a prolific beadworker, Boyer has also developed an extensive body of beadwork executed as "visualmaps". They are pieces that allude to stories of identity and place and can be "read as microcosms of an intersection of cultural and physical space".

Water Meets Body is a solo exhibition, held at the University of Winnipeg's Gallery 1C03, which will run from February 28-April 6 (2019), and the installations it features are created with video, sculpture and textiles. Referencing the specific intersection of the Red and Assiniboine Rivers, Boyer explores her personal relation to this geographic space.

== Selected exhibitions ==
- Material Girls, Dunlop Art Gallery, Regina (2015)
- Anishnaabensag Biimskowebshkigewag (Native Kids Ride Bikes), Dunlop Art Gallery, Regina (2016)
- BeadSpeak at Slate Fine Art Gallery Regina (2016)
- LandMarks 2017/ Repères 2017, Place and Placelessness, Winnipeg (2017)
- Out of Repetition, Difference, Zalucky Contemporary, Toronto (2017)
- Crafting the Future, OCADU Canadian Craft Biennial (2017)
- Li Salay, Art Gallery of Alberta, Edmonton (2018)
- Labour is the Body; Time is the Bridge, School of Art Gallery, Winnipeg (2018)
- The Prairie Rose Won't Mourn Us, Zalucky Contemporary, Toronto (2018)
- Water Meets Body, Gallery 1C03, Winnipeg (2019)
- Radical Stitch, MacKenzie Art Gallery (2022).
