= 1992 in Canada =

- Decades: 1970s; 1980s; 1990s; 2000s; 2010s
- See also: History of Canada; Timeline of Canadian history; List of years in Canada

Events from the year 1992 in Canada.

== Incumbents ==
=== Crown ===
- Monarch – Elizabeth II

=== Federal government ===
- Governor General – Ray Hnatyshyn
- Prime Minister – Brian Mulroney
- Chief Justice – Antonio Lamer (Quebec)
- Parliament – 34th

=== Provincial governments ===
==== Lieutenant governors ====
- Lieutenant Governor of Alberta – Gordon Towers
- Lieutenant Governor of British Columbia – David Lam
- Lieutenant Governor of Manitoba – George Johnson
- Lieutenant Governor of New Brunswick – Gilbert Finn
- Lieutenant Governor of Newfoundland – Frederick Russell
- Lieutenant Governor of Nova Scotia – Lloyd Crouse
- Lieutenant Governor of Ontario – Hal Jackman
- Lieutenant Governor of Prince Edward Island – Marion Reid
- Lieutenant Governor of Quebec – Martial Asselin
- Lieutenant Governor of Saskatchewan – Sylvia Fedoruk

==== Premiers ====
- Premier of Alberta – Don Getty (until December 14) then Ralph Klein
- Premier of British Columbia – Mike Harcourt
- Premier of Manitoba – Gary Filmon
- Premier of New Brunswick – Frank McKenna
- Premier of Newfoundland – Clyde Wells
- Premier of Nova Scotia – Donald Cameron
- Premier of Ontario – Bob Rae
- Premier of Prince Edward Island – Joe Ghiz
- Premier of Quebec – Robert Bourassa
- Premier of Saskatchewan – Roy Romanow

=== Territorial governments ===
==== Commissioners ====
- Commissioner of Yukon – John Kenneth McKinnon
- Commissioner of Northwest Territories – Daniel L. Norris

==== Premiers ====
- Premier of the Northwest Territories – Nellie Cournoyea
- Premier of Yukon – Tony Penikett (until November 7) then John Ostashek

== Events ==
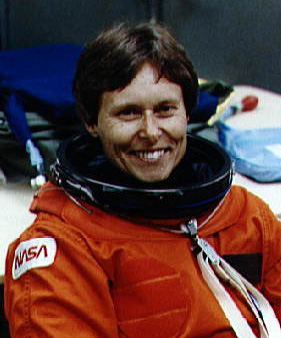
Dr. Roberta Bondar becomes the first Canadian woman in space on January 22

=== January to June ===
- January: CBC Television's documentary series The Valour and the Horror is criticized by Canadian veterans' groups for reportedly misrepresenting Canadian military conduct during World War II.
- January 22: On STS-42, Dr. Roberta Bondar becomes the first Canadian woman in space.
- February 6: Ruby Jubilee of Elizabeth II's accession as Queen of Canada
- April 5: The Iranian embassy in Ottawa is stormed by members of MEK, an Iraq-supported religious right group.
- April 16 to 19: Abduction and murder of Kristen French.
- May: Geological Survey of Canada expedition measures elevation of Mount Logan to 5,959 m.
- May 7: Three employees are murdered and one permanently disabled during a robbery at a McDonald's restaurant in Sydney River, Nova Scotia.
- May 9: 26 miners are killed in the Westray Mine Disaster.
- May 17: Official opening of celebrations of the 350th anniversary of Montreal.

=== July to September ===
- July 1:
  - Celebrations of the 125th anniversary of Confederation.
  - The Van Doos launch a successful operation to secure control of Sarajevo's airport.
  - Snowdrift, Northwest Territories, is renamed Łutselkʼe
- July 2: a two-year shutdown of the cod fishery is announced.
- August 8: During the Guns N' Roses/Metallica Stadium Tour, Metallica frontman and guitarist James Hetfield suffers second and third-degree burns during the band's concert at Olympic Stadium in Montreal. A riot broke out after Guns N' Roses singer Axl Rose complained of throat problems and called off the band's set after just 55 minutes.
- August 12: the details of North American Free Trade Agreement (NAFTA) are released.
- August 22: The final draft of the Charlottetown Accord, a proposed package of constitutional amendments, is released.
- August 24: A mechanical engineering professor, Valery Fabrikant, opens fire at Concordia University in Montreal killing four people.
- September 4: Nine workers at the Giant Mine are killed after striking employee Roger Warren detonates a bomb in the mine shaft.

=== October to December ===
- October: The ban on homosexuals in the Canadian military is lifted, following a legal challenge by Michelle Douglas.
- October 19: Yukon elections: John Ostashek's YP wins only a minority.
- October 24: The Toronto Blue Jays defeat the Atlanta Braves, 4 games to 2, winning their first World Series Title and becoming the first Canadian team to win the World Series.
- October 26: The Charlottetown Accord is rejected in a nationwide referendum.
- October 28: The 1992 Manitoba municipal elections take place.
- November 5: A referendum endorsing the creation of Nunavut is successful in the Northwest Territories.
- November 7: John Ostashek becomes government leader of the Yukon, replacing Tony Penikett.
- December 15: The first members of the Canadian Airborne Regiment arrive in Somalia on an ill-fated humanitarian mission.
- December 16: Ralph Klein succeeds Don Getty as Premier of Alberta.
- December 17: Prime Minister Brian Mulroney signs the NAFTA deal.

=== Full date unknown ===
- Rudolph A. Marcus wins the Nobel Prize for Chemistry.
- Agriculture Canada introduces a national BSE prevention program.
- Delwin Vriend, an Alberta teacher, wins a court case against the Alberta Human Rights Commission regarding the status of LGBT persons under the province's human rights legislation. The case was appealed to the Alberta Court of Appeal; see 1994 in Canada.
- Charles de Gaulle Obelisk, Montreal unveiled.
- Remsoft, an asset management software provider is founded.

== Arts and literature ==
=== New books ===
- The English Patient: Michael Ondaatje
- Tales from Firozsha Baag: Rohinton Mistry
- Inkorrect thots: bill bissett
- Mother, not mother: Di Brandt

=== Awards ===
- Michael Ondaatje's The English Patient wins the Booker Prize, the first Canadian to do so.
- See 1992 Governor General's Awards for a complete list of winners and finalists for those awards.
- Books in Canada First Novel Award: Rohinton Mistry, Such a Long Journey
- Gerald Lampert Award: Joanne Arnott, Wiles of Girlhood
- Pat Lowther Award: Kate Braid, Covering Rough Ground
- Marian Engel Award: Joan Barfoot
- Stephen Leacock Award: Roch Carrier, Prayers of a Very Wise Child
- Trillium Book Award: Michael Ondaatje, The English Patient
- Vicky Metcalf Award: Kevin Major

=== Music ===
- Alanis, Now Is the Time
- Barenaked Ladies, Gordon
- Beau Dommage, Beau Dommage au Forum
- Blue Rodeo, Lost Together
- Bootsauce, Bull
- La Bottine Souriante, Jusqu'aux p'tites heures
- Bourbon Tabernacle Choir, Superior Cackling Hen
- The Box, Decade of the Box
- Change of Heart, Smile
- Leonard Cohen, The Future
- Cowboy Junkies, Black Eyed Man
- 54-40, Dear Dear
- Front Line Assembly, Tactical Neural Implant
- Hart-Rouge, Le dernier mois de l'année
- hHead, Fireman
- Intermix, Intermix
- Jr. Gone Wild, Pull the Goalie
- Lava Hay, With a Picture in Mind
- Leslie Spit Treeo, Book of Rejection
- Martha and the Muffins, Modern Lullaby
- Moxy Früvous, Moxy Früvous
- Sarah McLachlan, Live EP
- The Northern Pikes, Neptune
- The Nylons, Live to Love
- The Rankin Family, Fare Thee Well Love
- Rheostatics, Whale Music
- Jane Siberry, A Collection 1984–1989 and Summer in the Yukon
- Skydiggers, Restless
- Sloan, Peppermint and Smeared
- The Tragically Hip, Fully Completely
- The Waltons, Lik My Trakter
- The Watchmen, mclarenfurnaceroom

=== Television ===
- August 28 : The last episode of the children's series The Raccoons on CBC Television

== Sport ==
- February 8–February 23 – 1992 Winter Olympics are held in Albertville, France. Canada finishes ninth in the medal count.
- May 17 – The Kamloops Blazers win their first Memorial Cup by defeating the Sault Ste. Marie Greyhounds 5 to 4.
- June 1 – Montreal's Mario Lemieux of the Pittsburgh Penguins wins his second consecutive Conn Smythe Trophy
- July 25–August 9 – At the 1992 Summer Olympics, the 295 Canadian Olympians win 7 gold medals, 4 silvers, and 7 bronzes.
- October 8 – The new Ottawa Senators are established and become the National Hockey League's eighth Canadian team. They defeat the Montreal Canadiens at the Ottawa Civic Centre in their first game back
- October 24 – The Toronto Blue Jays become the first Canadian team to win the World Series by defeating the Atlanta Braves 4 games to 2.
- November 21 – The Queen's Golden Gaels win their third Vanier Cup by defeating the St. Mary's Huskies 31 to 0 in the 28th Vanier Cup
- November 29 – The Calgary Stampeders win their third Grey Cup by defeating the Winnipeg Blue Bombers 24 to 10 in the 80th Grey Cup played at SkyDome in Toronto. Toronto's own Dave Sapunjis is awarded the Most Valuable Canadian for the second consecutive Cup.

== Births ==
=== January to March ===
- January 1 – Freddie Hamilton, ice hockey player
- January 7 – Erik Gudbranson, ice hockey player
- January 11
  - Laysla De Oliveira, actress
  - Mark Pysyk, ice hockey player
- January 21 – Quinton Howden, ice hockey player
- January 27 – Connor Widdows, actor
- January 31 – Tyler Seguin, ice hockey player
- February 3 – Lovell Adams-Gray, actor
- February 6 – Nora Fatehi, actress, dancer, and singer
- February 9 – Avan Jogia, actor, author, and director
- February 12 – Amanda Laine, model
- February 18
  - Brandon Gormley, ice hockey player
  - Melinda Shankar, actress
- March 7 – Justin Kelly, actor
- March 23
  - Typical Gamer, YouTuber
  - Vanessa Morgan, actress and singer

=== April to June ===
- April 1 – Gabriela Dabrowski, tennis player
- April 2 – John McFarland, ice hockey player
- April 5 – Emmalyn, singer
- April 11 – Victoria Hayward, softball player
- April 15 – Calvin Pickard, ice hockey player
- April 20 – Dylan McIlrath, ice hockey player
- April 21 – Maude Jacques, Paralympic wheelchair basketball player (died 2023)
- April 27 – J.P. Anderson, ice hockey player
- April 29 – Sarah Freeman, junior alpine skier
- May 2 – Brett Connolly, ice hockey player
- May 5 – Antoine Gélinas-Beaulieu, short track speed skater
- May 6 – Brendan Gallagher, ice hockey player
- May 7 – Alexander Ludwig, actor
- May 13
  - Keltie Hansen, freestyle skier
  - Mark Stone, ice hockey player
- May 14 – A.J. Saudin, actor
- May 16 – Jeff Skinner, ice hockey player
- May 18 – Laurie Kingsbury, ice hockey player
- May 27
  - Aaron Brown, sprinter
  - Laurence Vincent-Lapointe, canoeist
- May 31 – VanossGaming, YouTuber
- June 4
  - Annie Clark, actress
  - Savannah King, swimmer
- June 19 – Dylan Playfair, actor
- June 23 – Louis-Philippe Dury, actor
- June 24 – Jessica Campbell, ice hockey player and coach
- June 25 – Jaden Schwartz, ice hockey player

=== July to December ===
- July 24 – Mikaël Kingsbury, freestyle skier
- July 27 – Tory Lanez, rapper
- July 31 – Ryan Johansen, ice hockey player
- August 7 – Mark Visentin, ice hockey player
- August 9 – Burkely Duffield, actor
- September 3 – Nicholas Lindsay, soccer player
- September 19 – Kelsey Balkwill, athlete
- September 28 – Keir Gilchrist, actor
- October 5 – Eric Cabral, actor
- October 6 – Josh Archibald, ice hockey player
- October 17 – Mikaël Grenier, racing driver
- October 28 – Zack Phillips, ice hockey player
- November 4 – Josh Janniere, soccer player
- November 22 – Natalie Achonwa, basketball player
- December 5 – Natalie Sourisseau, field hockey player
- December 7 – Sean Couturier, ice hockey player
- December 10 – Melissa Roxburgh, actress
- December 11 – Dalton Pompey, baseball player
- December 21 – Andrew Chalmers, teen actor

== Deaths ==
=== January to March ===
- February 1 – Gary Lautens, humorist and newspaper columnist (born 1928)
- February 5 – Maxwell Meighen, financier (born 1908)
- February 25 – Louis Harrington Lewry, politician and reporter (born 1919)
- February 27 – S. I. Hayakawa, academic and politician (born 1906)
- March 3 – Robert Beatty, actor (born 1909)
- March 14 – Bill Allum, ice hockey player (born 1916)
- March 26 – Barbara Frum, radio and television journalist (born 1937)

=== April to June ===
- April 10 – Cec Linder, actor (born 1921)
- April 15 – Mud Bruneteau, professional ice hockey forward who player (born 1914)
- April 19 – Kristen French, murder victim (born 1976)
- May 9 – James Allan, politician (born 1894)

=== July to December ===
- July 5 – Pauline Jewett, politician and educator (born 1922)
- July 11 – Munroe Bourne, swimmer (born 1910)
- July 24 – Sam Berger, lawyer, businessman and football player (born 1900)
- July 30 – Joe Shuster, comic book artist (born 1914)
- September 3 – Émile Benoît, musician (born 1913)
- September 14 – Paul Martin Sr., politician (born 1903)
- September 27 – Hugh Llewellyn Keenleyside, diplomat, civil servant and 5th Commissioner of the Northwest Territories (born 1898)
- November 4 – George Klein, inventor (born 1904)
- November 14 – Greg Curnoe, painter (born 1936)
- December 13 – K. C. Irving, entrepreneur and industrialist (born 1899)
- December 28 – Pudlo Pudlat, artist (born 1916)

== See also ==
- 1992 in Canadian television
- List of Canadian films of 1992
