= 1900 in Canada =

- Decades: 1880s; 1890s; 1900s; 1910s; 1920s
- See also: History of Canada; Timeline of Canadian history; List of years in Canada

Events from the year 1900 in Canada.

== Incumbents ==
=== Crown ===
- Monarch – Victoria

=== Federal government ===
- Governor General – Gilbert Elliot-Murray-Kynynmound, 4th Earl of Minto
- Prime Minister – Wilfrid Laurier
- Chief Justice – Samuel Henry Strong (Ontario)
- Parliament – 8th (until 9 October)

=== Provincial governments ===
==== Lieutenant governors ====
- Lieutenant Governor of British Columbia – Thomas Robert McInnes (until June 21) then Henri-Gustave Joly de Lotbinière
- Lieutenant Governor of Manitoba – James Colebrooke Patterson (until October 10) then Daniel Hunter McMillan
- Lieutenant Governor of New Brunswick – Jabez Bunting Snowball
- Lieutenant Governor of Nova Scotia – Malachy Bowes Daly (until July 26) then Alfred Gilpin Jones
- Lieutenant Governor of Ontario – Oliver Mowat
- Lieutenant Governor of Prince Edward Island – Peter Adolphus McIntyre
- Lieutenant Governor of Quebec – Louis-Amable Jetté

==== Premiers ====
- Premier of British Columbia – Charles Augustus Semlin (until February 28) then Joseph Martin (February 28 to June 15) then Edward Gawler Prior
- Premier of Manitoba – Thomas Greenway (until January 10) then Hugh John Macdonald (January 10 to October 29) then Rodmond Roblin
- Premier of New Brunswick – Henry Emmerson (until August 31) then Lemuel John Tweedie
- Premier of Nova Scotia – George Henry Murray
- Premier of Ontario – George William Ross
- Premier of Prince Edward Island – Donald Farquharson
- Premier of Quebec – Félix-Gabriel Marchand (until October 8) then Simon-Napoléon Parent

=== Territorial governments ===
==== Commissioners ====
- Commissioner of Yukon – William Ogilvie

==== Lieutenant governors ====
- Lieutenant Governor of Keewatin – James Colebrooke Patterson (until October 10) then Daniel Hunter McMillan
- Lieutenant Governor of the North-West Territories – Amédée E. Forget

==== Premiers ====
- Premier of North-West Territories – Frederick Haultain

== Events ==
=== January to June ===
- January 8 – Hugh John Macdonald becomes premier of Manitoba, replacing Thomas Greenway.
- February 18 – February 27 – Boer War: The Royal Canadian Regiment of Infantry plays a decisive role in the Battle of Paardeberg.
- February 27 – Charles Semlin is dismissed as premier of British Columbia.
- February 28 – Joseph Martin becomes premier of British Columbia.
- March 16 – Boer War: Strathcona's Horse leave for South Africa.

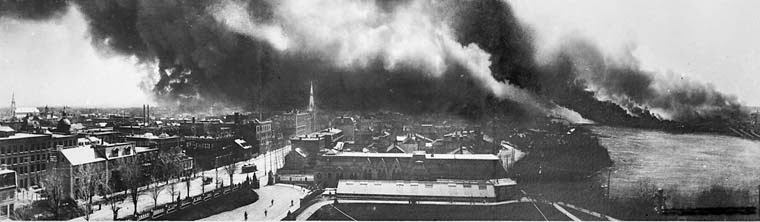
Hull fire on April 26, 1900.

- April 26 – Two-thirds of Hull, Quebec, is destroyed in a fire.
- June 15 – James Dunsmuir becomes premier of British Columbia, replacing Joseph Martin.

=== July to December ===
- August 31 – Lemuel John Tweedie becomes premier of New Brunswick, replacing Henry Emmerson.
- September 25 – Félix-Gabriel Marchand, Premier of Quebec, dies in office.
- October 8 – Simon-Napoléon Parent becomes premier of Quebec.
- October 29 – Sir Rodmond Roblin becomes premier of Manitoba, replacing Hugh John Macdonald.
- November 7
  - Federal election: Sir Wilfrid Laurier's Liberals win a second consecutive majority.
  - Boer War: The Battle of Leliefontein begins. Three Canadians receive the Victoria Cross for their valour in the engagement.
- December 6 – Alphonse Desjardins founds Mouvement Desjardins, the first credit union in North America.

=== Full date unknown ===
- The federal government doubles the head tax on Chinese immigrants
- The Canadian Tuberculosis Association meets for the first time

== Births ==
=== January to June ===
- January 1 – Sam Berger, lawyer, businessman and football player (d.1992)
- January 8
  - Harry Cassidy, academic, social reformer and civil servant (d.1951)
  - Solon Earl Low, politician (d.1962)
- February 20 – Graham Spry, broadcasting pioneer, business executive, diplomat and socialist (d.1983)
- March 12 – David Croll, politician (d.1991)
- April 3 – Albert Walsh, Lieutenant Governor of Newfoundland (d. 1958)
- April 19 – Roland Michener, lawyer, politician, diplomat and Governor-General of Canada (d.1991)
- April 30 – David Manners, actor (d.1998)
- May 25 – Alain Grandbois, poet (d.1975)

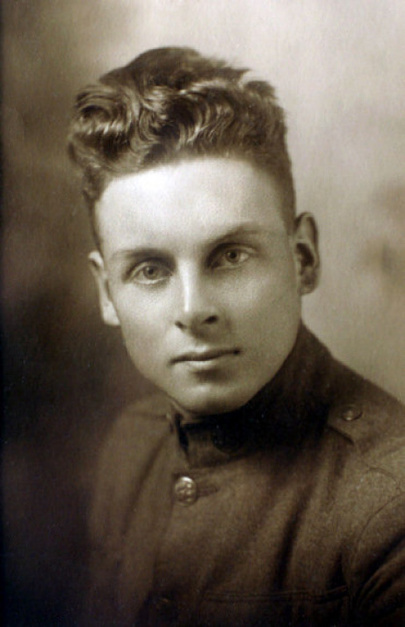
John Babcock in 1920

- May 25 – Malcolm Norris, Métis leader (d.1967)
- May 29 – Antonio Talbot, politician (d.1980)
- June 3 – Gordon Sinclair, journalist, writer and commentator (d.1984)
- June 21 – Edward S. Rogers, Sr., inventor and radio pioneer (d.1939)

=== July to December ===
- July 6 – Paul Métivier, World War I veteran (d. 2004)
- July 23 – John Babcock, Canada's last surviving World War I veteran (d.2010)
- August 13 – Gordon Sparling, filmmaker (d.1994)
- August 23 – Frances Adaskin, pianist (d. 2001)
- August 31 – James Campbell Clouston, naval officer (d.1940 in Dunkirk evacuation)
- September 6 – W. A. C. Bennett, Premier of British Columbia (d.1979)
- October 2 – Rod Keller, general (d. 1954)
- November 20 – Athole Shearer, actress (d.1985)
- November 27 – Jovette Bernier, journalist, author and radio show host (d.1981)
- November 28 – Mary Bothwell, classical vocalist and painter (d. mid-1970s)

== Deaths ==
- February 25 – Benjamin Pâquet, Roman Catholic priest and educationist (b.1832)
- March 1 – Frederick Carter, Premier of Newfoundland (b.1819)
- March 20 – George Hope Bertram, politician (b. 1847)
- August 4 – Marc-Aurèle Plamondon, lawyer, journalist, publisher, and judge (b.1823)
- August 11 – Georges-Isidore Barthe, lawyer, publisher, journalist and politician (b.1834)
- September 25 – Félix-Gabriel Marchand, journalist, author, notary, politician and 11th Premier of Quebec (b.1832)
- December 21 – Désiré Olivier Bourbeau, politician and merchant (b.1834)
