= Aubrey Jean Hanson =

Aubrey Jean Hanson is a Métis Nation of Alberta scholar, writer, and Associate Professor in Education at the University of Calgary. Hanson has published her work in English Studies in Canada, The Walrus, and Studies in American Indian Literatures. She is a member of the Otipemiswak Métis Government.

== Biography ==
Hanson grew up in Calgary. Her ancestors are Métis, German, Icelandic, French, Scottish, and English. She earned her Bachelor of Arts (Honours) in English from the University of Victoria and a BEd at OISE/UT. She obtined her PhD in Curriculum and Learning at the University of Calgary.

Hanson initially had a teaching career at the Calgary Board of Education. She joined the Werklund School of Education as a faculty member in 2015. She was Director of Indigenous Education for the Werklund School of Education. She is faculty member in Curriculum and Learning and co-coordinates the MEd Interdisciplinary Option Indigenous Education for Teachers. She is author of Literatures, communities, and Learning: Conversations with Indigenous Writers. She co-initiated the activation of the new University of Calgary online database to support teacher build foundational knowledge required to teaching Indigenous knowledge and perspectives for K-12 classrooms.

== Selected publications ==
- Literatures, Communities, and Learning: Conversations with Indigenous Writers. Hanson, A.. Wilfrid Laurier University Press. (2020)
- Reading Chrystos for feminisms that honour two-spirit erotics. . Hanson, A.. In S. Nickel & A. Fehr (Eds.), In good relation: History, gender, and kinship in Indigenous feminisms. University of Manitoba Press. 123-135. (2020)

== Awards ==
- Award for Leadership in Education, Werklund School of Education Academic Awards. 2024
- Award for Indigenous Ways of Knowing, University of Calgary Teaching Awards. 2022
- Experiential Learning Project in Sustainability Award, University of Calgary Sustainability Awards. 2020
- F.E.L. Priestley Prize, Association of Canadian College and University Teachers of English (ACCUTE). 2019
- Award for Teaching in Online Environments, University of Calgary Teaching Awards. 2018
- Top 40 Under 40, Avenue magazine. 2017
