= Otipemisiwak Métis Government =

Non-profit organisation

- Formation: 1928; 98 years ago
- Founder: Felice Callihoo, Joseph Dion, James P. Brady, Malcolm Norris, and Peter Tompkins.
- Type: Not-for-profit
- Headquarters: Delia Gray Building; 11738 Kingsway Ave; Edmonton, Alberta, T5G 0X5
- Services: Métis representation
- Members: 70,000 (2024)
- President: Andrea Sandmaier
- Main organ: Citizens' Council
- Affiliations: Métis National Council
- Website: albertametis.com
- Formerly called: Association des Métis Alberta et les Territoires du Nord-Ouest, Métis Association of Alberta, Métis Nation of Alberta

The Otipemisiwak Métis Government of Métis Nation within Alberta is a representative body for Métis people in Alberta, Canada. The full name describes two entities: the Métis Nation within Alberta (MNA) is the group of citizens or "one of the rights-bearing Métis collectivities that makes up the Métis Nation", and the Otipemisiwak Métis Government is the institution that represents those people. Although the body was founded as a simple not-for-profit society in 1928, since 2023 the organization has styled itself as a government and claims to be sovereign. However, as the Government of Canada does not recognize this sovereignty, the organization remains registered under the Societies Act in Alberta under the name Métis Nation of Alberta Association.

The organization formed in 1928 as the Association des Métis Alberta et les Territoires du Nord-Ouest; primary founding members included Felice Callihoo, Joseph Dion, James P. Brady, Malcolm Norris, and Peter Tompkins.

The Otipemisiwak Métis Government is led by a democratically elected President, a position held by Andrea Sandmaier since 2023, as well as by an elected Women's Representative and a Youth Representative. The organization also has 22 regionally-elected Citizens' Representatives and District Captains, who, together with the President, Women's Representative and Youth Representative, make up the Otipemisiwak Métis Government.

The organization and its 22 Districts have branches that deal with unemployment, child services, land-agreements, and the rights of Métis people as aboriginal peoples in Canada (as recognized and affirmed in Section 35 of the Constitution Act, 1982).

The MNA as of 2025 has over 72,000 registered citizens. Alberta itself is home to eight Métis Settlements established by Alberta provincial legislation from the 1930s; many Métis Settlement members are also registered MNA citizens, but many are not. The Métis Settlements are the only secure Métis land-base in Canada.

== History ==
The Métis Nation within Alberta is an integral part of the larger Métis Nation—a distinct Indigenous people whose homeland stretches across west-central North America.

By the early 1800s, the Métis Nation emerged as a new and distinct Indigenous people in what is now western Canada. The Métis Nation developed its own group identity, language (Michif), culture, way of life, and forms of self-government throughout the inter-related communities and territory of their homeland. The Métis Nation Homeland spans present day Manitoba, Saskatchewan, and Alberta, and extends into Ontario, British Columbia, the Northwest Territories, and the northern United States.

Since the early 20th century, the Métis in Alberta have organized at the provincial level to advocate for the rights and interests that we hold together as an Aboriginal people.

In 1928, Felice Callihoo, Joseph Dion, James P. Brady, Malcolm Norris, and Peter Tompkins founded the Association des Métis Alberta et les Territoires du Nord-Ouest, which would later be known as the Métis Association of Alberta (MAA; later renamed the Métis Nation of Alberta). The organization would be the manifestation of the Métis Nation within Alberta's long struggle to have their self-government, rights, and interests recognized within the province.

In 1934, in response to MAA lobbying, Alberta appointed the "Half-breed Commission" to examine and report on Métis health, education, homelessness, and land issues. The MAA's leadership consistently attended the commission's hearings. After a two-year investigation, the Commission recommended that the province provide Métis with a secure land base and adequate services. In 1938, Alberta responded by adopting the Métis Population Betterment Act, which created the province's 12 original Métis colonies (between 1941 and 1960, Alberta rescinded four of these colonies).

In 1961, the MAA was first incorporated and registered under provincial legislation. This registration was mainly done because governments began making funding available to Indigenous representative organizations such as the MNA but insisted that such organizations be incorporated in order to be legally-recognized entities and obtain the funding available. MAA's leaders chose to incorporate the organization to act as a legal and administrative complement to Métis self-government.

In 1975, the Alberta Federation of Metis Settlements Association (FMS) was incorporated and registered under provincial legislation. It aimed to provide the remaining Métis colonies with a united voice. One of the FMS' earliest leaders, Adrian Hope, was a proud member of the MAA who had attended the hearings of the Half -breed Commission on the MAA's behalf and had served as MAA president from 1961 to 1967. The FMS negotiated with the Government of Alberta for increased political, cultural, social, and economic development on the eight remaining Métis colonies.

Ultimately, these negotiations culminated in the signing of the Alberta-Metis Settlements Accord in 1989. The following year, pursuant to the Accord, Alberta passed the Metis Settlements Act and related legislation, and granted the Metis Settlements General Council (MSGC) fee-simple title to the lands of what are now known as the Metis Settlements. This was done for the benefit of all Métis in Alberta:

[T]his legislation is for all Métis of Alberta. Yes, it's directed to the settlements because that is in fact where the land base of 1.25 million acres is located, on the eight settlements. But any Métis can access membership and the rights to live and follow the Métis culture on these settlements... The Métis Association of Alberta, which is more or less the umbrella group for off-settlement Métis, concurs in this process. That in itself is historic because the Métis community have come together on this process realizing that they all win, they all have access to it. So I don't think we're establishing two classes of people. That's not the intent. We're doing this for the Métis of Alberta ....

The MNA has the only objectively verifiable registry of citizens of the Métis Nation within Alberta, a registry funded by the federal government, which is the level of government with constitutional responsibility for Métis. Citizens of the Metis Nation exist both on and off of the Metis Settlements and Métis Settlement membership, in of itself, does not necessarily identify rights-bearing citizens of the Métis Nation.

On 16 November 2017, the MNA and Canada signed a Framework Agreement that set the stage for self-government negotiations with the Métis Nation within Alberta. In particular, the Framework Agreement commits the parties to making best-efforts to reach a self-government agreement within two years (by 16 November 2019) that would provide for recognition of a constitution, which would establish the core functions of a self-government for the Métis Nation within Alberta. On June 27, 2019, the Government of Canada and the Métis Nation of Alberta signed a Métis Government Recognition and Self-Government Agreement (MGRSA) which recognizes the MNA as the government of the Metis Nation within Alberta and identifies the path for formalizing that recognition of the MNA as the government of the Métis Nation within Alberta within the Canadian legal system.

=== 2020s: Defections and a new constitution ===
In 2020, six locals of the MNA voted to leave the MNA and start a new body called the Alberta Metis Federation. This was at the same time that the MNA was in a dispute with the Manitoba Metis Federation.

In 2021 the MNA sued the province for breaking off negotiations over a Metis Consultation Policy (MCP). In January 2022, Justice Bernadette Ho of the Alberta Court of King's Bench ruled that the Government had the right to stop negotiations and that the "MNA has not provided a conclusive answer to the question of who speaks for the non-settlement Métis".

In December 2022, MNA members voted to approve the Otipemisiwak Métis Government Constitution. The legality of this document has been challenged in court by the Metis Settlements General Council and the MNA local Grande Cache.

On February 24, 2023, the MNA signed the Métis Nation Within Alberta Self-Government Recognition and Implementation Agreement with the Government of Canada. Métis Settlements General Council has filed a notice in the federal court for a judicial review of this agreement. The Fort Macy Metis has also challenged this agreement on the basis that the agreement "adopts and deploys the term 'Métis Nation within Alberta' in order to assert a province-wide geographical scope of the MNA's self-government that will, or has the potential to, subsume and/or supplant rights-bearing Métis Communities."

The official name of the organization was changed to "Otipemisiwak Métis Government of the Métis Nation within Alberta" on September 29, 2023.

== Organization and governance ==
The Otipemisiwak Métis Government (OMG) is led by a democratically elected President a position currently (as of 2023) held by Andrea Sandmaier since 2023, as well as an elected Women's Representative and Youth Representative. The organization also has 22 regionally-elected Citizens' Representatives and District Captains, who, together with the Provincial President, Women's Representative and Youth Representative, make up the Otipemisiwak Métis Government.

The organization has branches that deal with unemployment, child services, land agreements, and the rights of Métis people as Aboriginal peoples in Canada (as recognized and affirmed in Section 35 of the Constitution Act, 1982). The OMG currently has over 72,000 registered citizens. These branches have appointed Secretaries that deal with their respective portfolios. Secretaries are members of the Citizens' Council, that are appointed to Cabinet (government) by the President. These Secretaries meet with government officials and stakeholders.

Provincially Elected Roles:

Role	Name (as of 2025)
President	Andrea Sandmaier
Women's Representative	Gabrielle Blatz
Youth Representative	Rebecca Lavallee

The MNA is divided into 22 Districts across Alberta, each with its own Citizens' Representative and District Captain:

District	Citizens' Representative / District Captain (as of 2026)	Approx. Region
1 Foothills	Darryl W. Campbell / Guy L’Heureux	Southern Alberta
2 Medicine Hat	Catherine Schnell / Heather Seale	South East Alberta
3 Red Deer	Joe Chodzicki / Bernie Ouellette	Red Deer County
4 Rocky View	Trevor Ward / Vacant	South Central Alberta
5 Calgary Nose Hill	Nelson Anthony Lussier / Kevin Metz	North Calgary
6 Calgary Elbow	Jason Chernow / Carmen Lasante	South Calgary
7 Jasper House	Kaila Mitchell / Terry Rudyk	Central Western Alberta
8 Lac Ste. Anne	Lisa Wolfe / Mike Hanly	Central Alberta, Lac Ste. Anne County
9 Fort Edmonton	Sarah Wolfe / Joseph René de Meulles	South Edmonton
10 Edmonton Whitemud	Aura Leddy / Vacant	North Edmonton
11 St. Albert	Alfred L'Hirondelle / Brad Martin	St. Albert, Alberta, Beaumont, Alberta, Leduc, Alberta
12 St. Paul-Cold Lake	Karen Collins / Bernie Poitras	Central East Alberta
13 Grande Prairie	Shannon Dunfield / Vacant	Grande Prairie
14 Peace River	Barry Dibb / Vacant	Peace River
15 Fort Vermilion	Bobbi Paul-Alook / Vacant	Northwestern Alberta
16 Fort Chipewyan	Judy Ann Cardinal / Vacant	North Eastern Alberta
17 Fort McMurray	Brooke Bramfield / Kelly Myers	North Eastern Alberta, Fort McMurray
18 Conklin	Valerie Quintal / Vacant	North Eastern Alberta
19 Lac La Biche	Jason Ekeberg / Chantel Sparklingeyes	Eastern Alberta, Lac La Biche
20 Athabasca Landing	Joseph Noel Tremblay / Brian Ladouceur	Central Alberta
21 Lesser Slave Lake	Grant Lacombe / Brenda Genaille	Northern Alberta, Lesser Slave Lake
22 Wabasca-Desmarais	Cindy Moore / Diane Kim Peredery	Northern Alberta

The Otipemisiwak Métis Government Cabinet:

Position	Member (as of 2026)	District
President; Chair of Cabinet; Secretary of Self-Government, Métis Rights & Consultation, Intergovernmental Relations, Truth & Reconciliation, & Tourism; Governor of Métis National Council	Andrea Sandmaier	Provincially Elected
Acting President; Secretary of Citizenship & Registry; Governor of Métis National Council	Joseph Chodzicky	3 Red Deer
Secretary of Treasury	Jason Ekeburg	19 Lac La Biche
Secretary of Records	Sarah Wolfe	9 Fort Edmonton
Secretary of Women, Gender Equity, & Inclusivity	Rebecca Lavallee	Provincially Elected
Secretary of Youth & Sport	Rebecca Lavallee	Provincially Elected
Health, Wellbeing & Seniors	Kaila Mitchell	7 Jasper House
Secretary of Children & Family Services	Brooke Bramfield	17 Fort McMurray
Secretary of Housing & Infrastructure	Valerie Quintal	18 Conklin
Secretary of Education, Training, & Veteran Affairs	Lisa Wolfe	8 Lac Ste. Anne
Secretary of Harvesting & Culture	Grant Lacombe	21 Lesser Slave Lake
Secretary of Métis Settlement & First Nation Relations & Language Revitalization	Karen (KC) Collins	12 St. Paul-Cold Lake
Secretary of Environment, Climate Change, & Emergency Management	Aura Leddy	10 Edmonton Whitemud
Secretary of Justice	Nelson Lussier	5 Calgary Nose Hill
Secretary of Economic & Rural Development	Barry Dibb	14 Peace River

== Métis Settlements General Council ==
The Métis of Alberta are the only Métis in Canada to have a negotiated and legislated land base. There are eight Metis settlements covering an area of 1,400,000 acres (5,700 km^{2}). The land was granted by letters patent in 1990 and is held collectively in fee simple through the Métis Settlements General Council, the only governing political assembly of the Metis territories.

The eight settlements are listed below.

List of Métis settlements in Alberta
Name	Municipal district or specialized municipality	2021 Census of Population				
Name	Municipal district or specialized municipality	Population (2021)	Population (2016)	Change (%)	Land area (km^{2})	Population density (/km^{2})
Buffalo Lake	Smoky Lake County	379	712	−46.8%	335.68	1.1
East Prairie	Big Lakes County	310	304	+2.0%	328.42	0.9
Elizabeth	MD of Bonnyville No. 87	594	653	−9.0%	246.45	2.4
Fishing Lake	MD of Bonnyville No. 87	414	446	−7.2%	348.64	1.2
Gift Lake (Note: Gift Lake comprises two parts. The majority is located within Big Lakes County, while the balance is located within Northern Sunrise County. The Big Lakes County portion (part "A") had a population of 625 living on 802.46 km^{2} (309.83 mi^{2}) in 2021, while the Northern Sunrise County portion (part "B") had a population of 0 living on 0.83 km^{2} (0.32 mi^{2}).)	Big Lakes County; Northern Sunrise County	625	658	−5.0%	803.29	0.8
Kikino (Note: Kikino comprises two parts. The majority is located within Smoky Lake County, while the balance is located within Lac La Biche County. The Smoky Lake County portion (part "A") had a population of 978 living on 440.92 km^{2} (170.24 mi^{2}) in 2021, while the Lac La Biche County portion (part "B") had a population of 0 living on 0.77 km^{2} (0.30 mi^{2}).)	Smoky Lake County; Lac La Biche County	978	934	+4.7%	441.69	2.2
Paddle Prairie	County of Northern Lights	551	544	+1.3%	1,726.45	0.3
Peavine	Big Lakes County	387	607	−36.2%	798.95	0.5
Total Métis settlements		4,238	4,858	−12.8%	5,029.57	0.8

== Notable people ==
- Muriel Stanley Venne (1937–2024), community leader and Indigenous rights activist
- Deborah Saucier, neuroscientist and academic administrator

== See also ==
- Mobile diabetes screening initiative
