= Sarah Freeman =

Sarah Freeman may refer to:

- Sarah Freeman (skier) (born 1992), Canadian junior alpine skier
- Sarah Wilkerson Freeman (born 1956), American historian and curator
