= 1898 in Canada =

- Decades: 1870s; 1880s; 1890s; 1900s; 1910s
- See also: History of Canada; Timeline of Canadian history; List of years in Canada

Events from the year 1898 in Canada.

== Incumbents ==
=== Crown ===
- Monarch – Victoria

=== Federal government ===
- Governor General – John Hamilton-Gordon, 7th Earl of Aberdeen (until November 12) then Gilbert Elliot-Murray-Kynynmound, 4th Earl of Minto
- Prime Minister – Wilfrid Laurier
- Chief Justice – Samuel Henry Strong (Ontario)
- Parliament – 8th

=== Provincial governments ===
==== Lieutenant governors ====
- Lieutenant Governor of British Columbia – Thomas Robert McInnes
- Lieutenant Governor of Manitoba – James Colebrooke Patterson
- Lieutenant Governor of New Brunswick – Jabez Bunting Snowball
- Lieutenant Governor of Nova Scotia – Malachy Bowes Daly
- Lieutenant Governor of Ontario – Oliver Mowat
- Lieutenant Governor of Prince Edward Island – George William Howlan
- Lieutenant Governor of Quebec – Joseph-Adolphe Chapleau (until January 20) then Louis-Amable Jetté

==== Premiers ====
- Premier of British Columbia – John Herbert Turner (until August 15) then Charles Augustus Semlin
- Premier of Manitoba – Thomas Greenway
- Premier of New Brunswick – Henry Emmerson
- Premier of Nova Scotia – George Henry Murray
- Premier of Ontario – Arthur Sturgis Hardy
- Premier of Prince Edward Island – Alexander Warburton (until August 1) then Donald Farquharson
- Premier of Quebec – Félix-Gabriel Marchand

=== Territorial governments ===
==== Commissioners ====
- Commissioner of Yukon – James Morrow Walsh (until July 5) then William Ogilvie

==== Lieutenant governors ====
- Lieutenant Governor of Keewatin – James Colebrooke Patterson
- Lieutenant Governor of the North-West Territories – Charles Herbert Mackintosh (until May 30) then Malcolm Colin Cameron (May 30 to September 26) then Amédée E. Forget (from October 4)

==== Premiers ====
- Premier of North-West Territories – Frederick Haultain

== Events ==
- March 1 – 1898 Ontario election: A. S. Hardy's Liberals win a majority.
- June 13 – Yukon becomes a distinct territory from the North-West Territories.
- July 29 – White Pass and Yukon Route opens (Skagway–Whitehorse).
- August – Donald Farquharson becomes Premier of Prince Edward Island, replacing A. B. Warburton.
- August 8 – John Herbert Turner is dismissed as premier of British Columbia.
- August 15 – Charles Semlin becomes premier of British Columbia.
- September 11 – New Westminster, British Columbia destroyed by fire.
- September 29 – The Canadian referendum on the prohibition of alcohol.
- November 4 – The fourth election of the North-West Legislative Assembly.

=== Full date unknown ===
- The Parliament of Canada passes the Quebec Boundary Extension Act, expanding the provincial boundaries northward to include the lands of the aboriginal Cree.
- Kit Coleman covers the Spanish–American War as Canada's first female war correspondent.

== Births ==
- May 17 – A. J. Casson, Canadian painter (d. 1992)
- May 20 – Paul Gouin, politician (d.1976)
- May 27 – William Arthur Irwin, journalist
- July 7 – Hugh Llewellyn Keenleyside, diplomat, civil servant and 5th Commissioner of the Northwest Territories (d.1992)
- July 15 – Howard Graham, army officer (d. 1986)
- July 17 – Osmond Borradaile, cameraman, cinematographer and veteran of First and Second World War (d.1999)
- August 23 – Brooke Claxton, politician and Minister (d.1960)
- August 27
  - Gaspard Fauteux, politician, Speaker of the House of Commons of Canada and Lieutenant-Governor of Quebec (d.1963)
  - John Hamilton, bank robber (d. 1934)
- August 30 – Gleason Belzile, politician (d.1950)
- November 9 – Emmett Matthew Hall, jurist, civil libertarian and Supreme Court justice (d.1995)
- December 1 – Stuart Garson, politician, Minister and 12th Premier of Manitoba (d.1977)
- December 15 – George Lawrence Price, last Commonwealth casualty of World War I (d.1918)

=== Full date unknown ===
- Maurice Spector, Chairman of the Communist Party of Canada (d.1968)

== Deaths ==
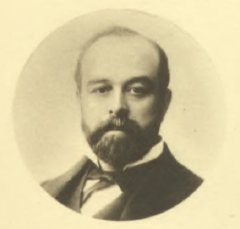
Theodore Davie

- January 1 – John Arthur Fraser, artist (b.1838)
- February 15 – Wilfrid Prévost, lawyer and politician (b.1832)
- March 7 – Theodore Davie, lawyer, politician and 9th Premier of British Columbia (b.1852)
- May 1 – Nazaire-Nicolas Olivier, lawyer and politician (b. c1860)
- May 13 – François Bourassa, farmer and politician (b.1813)

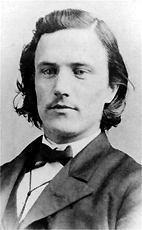
Joseph-Adolphe Chapleau

- April 12 – Elzéar-Alexandre Taschereau, Archbishop of Quebec (b.1820)
- June 13 – Joseph-Adolphe Chapleau, lawyer, politician and 5th Premier of Quebec (b.1840)
- July 14 – Louis-François Richer Laflèche, diocese of Trois-Rivières (b.1818)
- August 24 – Casimir Gzowski, engineer (b.1813)

== See also ==
- List of Canadian films
