= 1841 in Canada =

- Decades: 1820s; 1830s; 1840s; 1850s; 1860s
- See also: History of Canada; Timeline of Canadian history; List of years in Canada

Events from the year 1841 in Canada.

== Incumbents ==
- Monarch: Victoria

=== Federal government ===
- Parliament: 1st (starting June 15)

=== Governors ===
- Governor General of the Province of Canada: Charles Poulett Thomson, 1st Baron Sydenham (until 16 September); vacant then
- Governor of New Brunswick: William MacBean George Colebrooke
- Governor of Nova Scotia: Lucius Cary, 10th Viscount Falkland
- Civil Governor of Newfoundland: John Harvey
- Governor of Prince Edward Island: Henry Vere Huntley
- Governor of Canada West: John Clitherow then Richard Downes Jackson
- Governor of Upper Canada: Charles Poulett Thomson

=== Premiers ===
- Joint Premiers of the Province of Canada —
  - William Henry Draper, Canada West Premier
  - Samuel Harrison, Canada East Premier

== Events ==
- February 10 – The Union of Upper and Lower Canada establishes the Province of Canada.
- June 15 – The 1st Parliament of the Province of Canada meets at Kingston.
- October 2 – The Canada Gazette publishes its first issue.
- December 20 – The Kingston Common Council establishes a police force.
- The Dawn Settlement, in what is now Dresden, Ontario, is established to provide self-help for Blacks in agricultural communities.

== Births ==
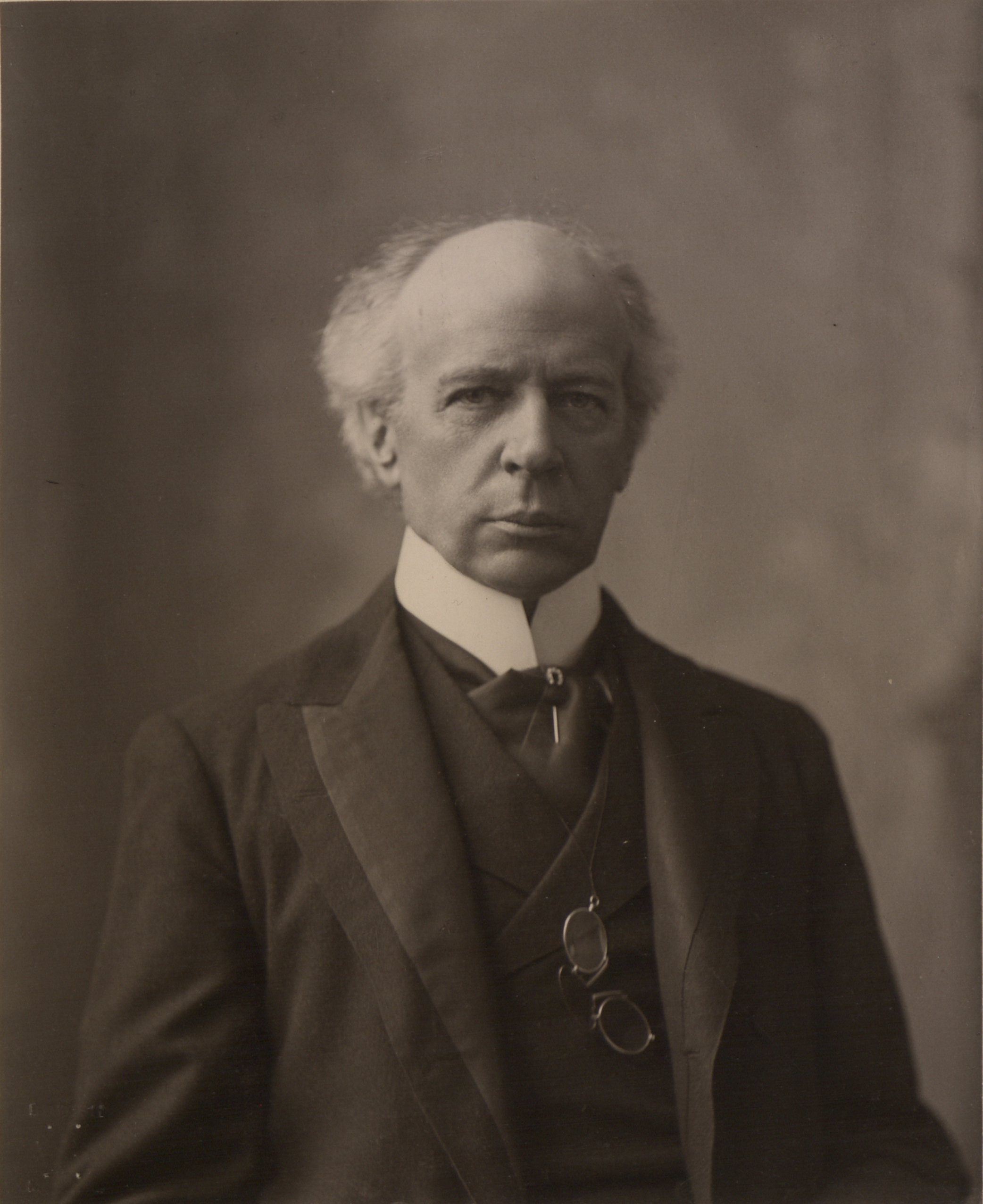
Wilfrid Laurier

- January 15 – Frederick Stanley, 16th Earl of Derby, Governor General of Canada (died 1908)
- March 9 – Robert Atkinson Davis, businessman, politician and 4th Premier of Manitoba (died 1903)
- April 15 – Joseph E. Seagram, distillery founder, politician, philanthropist and racehorse owner (died 1919)
- April 21 – Jennie Kidd Trout, physician, first woman in Canada legally to become a medical doctor and only woman in Canada licensed to practice medicine until 1880 (died 1921)
- May 8 – John Norquay, politician and 5th Premier of Manitoba (died 1889)
- August 3 – Juliana Horatio Ewing, poet and writer of children's novels set in Canada.(died 1885)
- August 10
  - James David Edgar, politician (died 1899)
  - Oronhyatekha, Mohawk physician, CEO of an international benefit society, native statesman, scholar, rights campaigner and international shooter (died 1907)

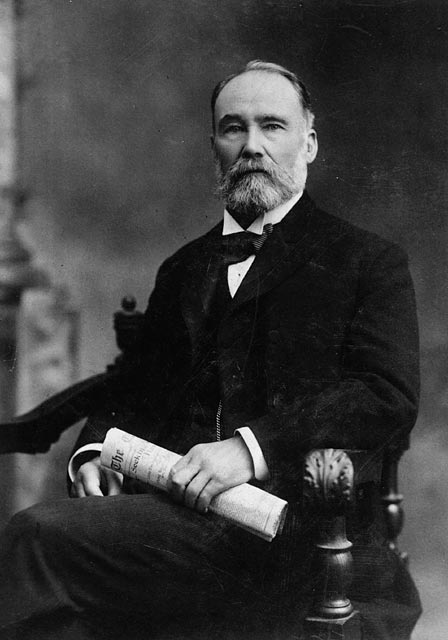
George William Ross

- September 13 – George Airey Kirkpatrick, politician (died 1899)
- September 18 – George William Ross, educator, politician and 5th Premier of Ontario (died 1914)
- November 20 – Wilfrid Laurier, politician and 7th Prime Minister of Canada (died 1919)
- December 23 – John Brown, politician, miller, mining consultant and prospector (died 1905)
