= Mobile diabetes screening initiative =

Health screening program in Alberta, Canada

The Mobile Diabetes Screening Initiative (MDSi) is a diabetes screening program based at the University of Alberta, Edmonton, Alberta, Canada, and is part of the BRAID Diabetes Research Group. MDSi has a field team of health professionals, which travels to remote and rural communities in Alberta, particularly off-reserve Aboriginal Communities (including the eight incorporated Métis Settlements in Alberta) to carry out diabetes and cardiovascular screening.

Little is known about diabetes and Métis people. MDSi is collecting the first clinical data on Alberta's Métis population. So far, MDSi has tested 25% of Métis people living in the eight Métis Settlements.

MDSi began operations in 2003. The program is funded by Alberta Health and Wellness as part of Alberta's 10-year Diabetes Strategy (2003–2013).
