= Amanda Laine =

Canadian model (born 1992)

- Born: February 12, 1992 (age 34); Orillia, Ontario, Canada
- Modeling information
- Height: 5 ft 11 in / 180 cm
- Hair color: Brown
- Eye color: Hazel
- Agency: Elmer Olsen Model Management, Next Model Management

Amanda Laine (born February 12, 1992) is a Canadian model. She was named one of the top ten newcomers in 2008 by models.com.

== Early life and career ==
Laine was born in Orillia, Ontario, Canada. Her modeling career started when she won the V Magazine and Supreme Model Management search in December 2007, and then signed a 3-year contract with Supreme Management. Laine then debuted in the fall Alexander Wang and Rad Hourani shows in 2008. Throughout 2008 she has opened for Alexander McQueen and Miu Miu shows in Paris, the spring Vera Wang, Philosophy di, Rebecca Taylor, Alberta Ferretti, Paul Smith, Burberry, Luella, and Jeremy Laing shows in New York, London, and Milan. She has also walked for many designers at LG Fashion Week like Joe Fresh. For six consecutive seasons she has walked for Emilio Pucci at Milan Fashion Week.

Laine has also appeared at the Prada show in Milan, and was referred to as a "Canadian teen supermodel" by the Toronto Star.
