= James P. Brady =

Canadian Métis political leader (1908–1967)

Jim Brady
- Born: Gunner James Patrick Brady; April 11, 1908; St. Vincent, Alberta
- Disappeared: June 7, 1967 (aged 59) northern Saskatchewan
- Status: Missing for 59 years, 4 months and 14 days
- Relatives: Berkley Brady (great-niece)

James Patrick Brady, better known as Jim Brady (March 11, 1908 – disappeared June 7, 1967), was a Canadian Métis political leader and activist in Saskatchewan and Alberta. Along with Malcolm Norris, he is generally regarded as one of the two most influential Métis leaders of his era. Brady was a self-educated Marxist, Socialist, and Métis nationalist, as well as a member of the Communist Party of Canada. Brady was a strong advocate and voice for the Métis of Alberta and would go on to become an instrumental part in the formalization of today's contemporary Métis Settlements in Alberta. Brady is a member of the historic Metis Settlements "Famous Five" leadership alongside Norris, Felix Callihoo, Joseph Dion, Pete Tomkins.

In addition to his political work, Brady was a well-known photographer. Primarily showcasing woodlands or hunting scenes, Brady used the lens to argue for Métis political resurgence and self-determination. In notable works collected by the Glenbow Museum, Brady's peers can be seen demonstrating principles of self-sufficiency and living off the land, central to the artist's ideology. Brady practiced until his disappearance, and saw this pastime as a tool of resistance against settler colonialism.

== Biography ==
He was born on March 11, 1908, parented by Philomena Garneau, a daughter of Métis Strathcona, Alberta pioneer couple, Laurent and Eleanor Garneau, and Irish immigrant James Brady Sr.

He helped to found numerous Métis political organizations in Western Canada. These included the Métis Association of Alberta, the Métis Association of Saskatchewan, and the Métis Association of La Ronge. He and Norris were motive force behind formation of Alberta's Metis settlements, founded in the 1938.

Brady served in the Canadian Army in the European Theatre of World War II.

== Disappearance ==
Jim Brady's disappearance is still the subject of mystery and controversy. He disappeared in northern Saskatchewan while on a prospecting trip with a Cree friend in June 1967. Their remains were never found, fueling speculation that they may have been murdered, or assassinated for his political activities.

== See also ==
- List of people who disappeared
- Métis in Alberta
- Politics of Saskatchewan
