= Métis Population Betterment Act =

Alberta (Canada) government act of 1938

The Métis Population Betterment Act was a 1938 act of the Alberta Legislature in Canada that created a committee of members of the Métis and the government to plot out lands for allocation to the Métis.

== History ==
Alberta had been established as a provisional district within Canada in 1882, and was expanded and promoted to province status in 1905. This led to an expansion of its population and government oversight as well. As the population grew, the province began to allocate reserve land for agricultural purposes. By the 1930s, this had created trouble for the Métis people, many of whom had been living and hunting in areas that were now being given to new settlers. As the Great Depression strengthened, the Métis people's situation grew worse, and they began to organize to gain a political voice. This led to the 1934 creation of the Ewing Commission, a royal commission intended to develop effective Métis-related policies. The results of the commission's studies formed the basis of the Métis Population Betterment Act, which was passed on November 22, 1938.

The act laid out twelve areas for allocation to the Métis, which were mapped out in 1938 and 1939. The original Act gave the Métis substantial autonomy on these lands, creating ongoing cooperation between the Métis and Crown representatives toward the improvement of quality of life for the Métis. Revisions to the act in 1940, however, reduced the role of the Métis in their own affairs, removing language within the act that required "conferences and negotiations" between representatives of the Albertan government and of the Métis people in determining how the Métis lands were handled. This reduced their autonomy and left them in charge of land occupation and timber, among several other things. Throughout the subsequent decade, the Métis received government funds to construct schools, roads, housing, engage in commercial fishing, and extracting timber. Meanwhile, it came to light that certain lands given to the Métis were insufficient to create a living for the people placed there, and these settlements were rescinded. By 1960, only eight of the original lands were still in the hands of the Métis.

== See also ==
- Métis in Alberta
