= Remsoft =

Software company in Canada

- Type: Private
- Industry: Software; Asset Management
- Founded: 1992
- Headquarters: Fredericton, New Brunswick, Canada
- Key people: Andrea Feuenekes, CEO; Ugo Feuenekes, CTO
- Products: Asset Management and Asset optimization solutions
- Website: www.remsoft.com

Remsoft is a Canadian provider of asset management and asset optimization solutions for forestry, natural resource, environmental, transportation, and infrastructure assets "to help them manage long-term priority and financial planning." The company was founded in 1992 by Andrea Feunekes, CEO, and Ugo Feunekes, CTO and is headquartered in Fredericton, New Brunswick, Canada.
It was named a Gartner Cool Vendor in 2011.

== Technology ==
Remsoft's technology uses a combination of Metamodeling, Business process modeling and Heuristic analysis to analyze variables and arrive at preferred outcomes. The most recent updates to its technology platform were released in December 2018.

== Management ==
On 9 July 2020, Remsoft has confirmed Corinne Watson 's role as General Manager, Asia Pacific. In her position she will help on-the-ground consumer satisfaction and accelerate development in the Australasia region.

== Customers ==
The company's customers include:

- American Forest Management
- Department of Transportation (New Brunswick)
- Forestry Tasmania
- Washington Department of Natural Resources

== Services ==
- Road Optimizer Assessment Service - road planning.
- Model Integration Service - free up the time to work on more critical studies.
- Model Audit Service - offers professional feedback and suggestions on model development and opportunities for change.
- Enhanced Support Service - provides an expanded service standard that goes above that provided by Annual Maintenance and Support.
