= Paul Métivier =

Canadian veteran (1900–2004)

- Born: Paul Antonio Métivier; July 6, 1900; Montreal, Quebec, Canada
- Died: December 22, 2004 (aged 104); Canada
- Known for: One of the last surviving the First World War veterans

Paul Antonio Métivier (July 6, 1900 – December 22, 2004) was one of the last surviving Canadian veterans of the First World War. He was born in Montreal, Quebec.

== Service ==
Metiver enlisted in the Canadian Expeditionary Force at the age of 16, having told the recruiter he was 19. He served with the 4th Canadian Division Ammunition Column, delivering munitions by mule. He was awarded the British War Medal and Victory Medal.

During the Second World War, his son Joseph Roland was killed in combat on August 17, 1942 while serving with 58 Squadron of the Royal Canadian Air Force; he has no known grave.

== Veteran ==
In later life, Metivier was awarded the French Légion d'honneur for his service in the First World War and a certificate of appreciation for his selfless contribution to the war effort, signed by Her Majesty Queen Elizabeth. For his military service he was awarded the British War and Victory medals and a Class A Service Badge.

He became well known for his attendance at the Remembrance Day ceremony in Ottawa every November 11, despite his advanced age, regardless of the weather or even his own health. He was also involved with Veterans Affairs Canada in the repatriation of Canada's Unknown Soldier from Vimy, France in 2000.

He became the sole surviving veteran of World War I living in Ottawa, Ontario and, upon his death, one of only six veterans of the First World War still living in Canada. He was survived by four children, 11 grandchildren and 13 great-grandchildren. His wife Flore had died in 1992, after some 72 years of marriage.

Paul Métivier Drive, a street running east to west between Woodroffe Avenue and Longfields, in Ottawa, Ontario was named in his honour.
