= Eric Cabral =

Canadian former child actor

- Born: October 5, 1992 (age 33); London, Ontario
- Occupations: Actor; Voice actor University Professor
- Years active: 2000-2004, 2015-Present
- Height: 5 ft 8 in (173 cm)
- Spouse(s): Adam Cabral (Brother); Dave Cabral (brother); John Cabral (brother); Roxie (kitty)

Eric Cabral (born October 5, 1992) is a Canadian former child actor, who acted in television films and series.

== Personal life ==
Eric Cabral was born in London, Ontario. He is the second youngest child, with Adam, who is also an actor and voice actor, being the youngest. Eric and David both have two older brothers Dave and John respectively.

== Filmography ==
=== Films ===
- Rated X - Young Artie Jay Mitchell (2000) (TV film)
- Witchblade - Young Nottingham (uncredited) (2000) (TV film)
- Wild Iris - Lonnie Bravard (age 6) (2001) (TV film)
- Detention - Young boy (2003)

=== Television ===
- More Haunted Houses - Young Child (2000)
- Falcone - Christopher Napoli (2000)
- The Strange Legacy of Cameron Cruz - Kid #1 (2002)
- Witchblade - Young Nottingham (uncredited) (2002) (Episode: "Consectatio")
- Odyssey 5 - Isaac Sussman (2002) (Episode: "The Choices We Make")
- Train 48 - – Eric (2004) (1 Episode)
