= Métis =

Mixed Indigenous ethnic group of Canada and the US

Métis Michif

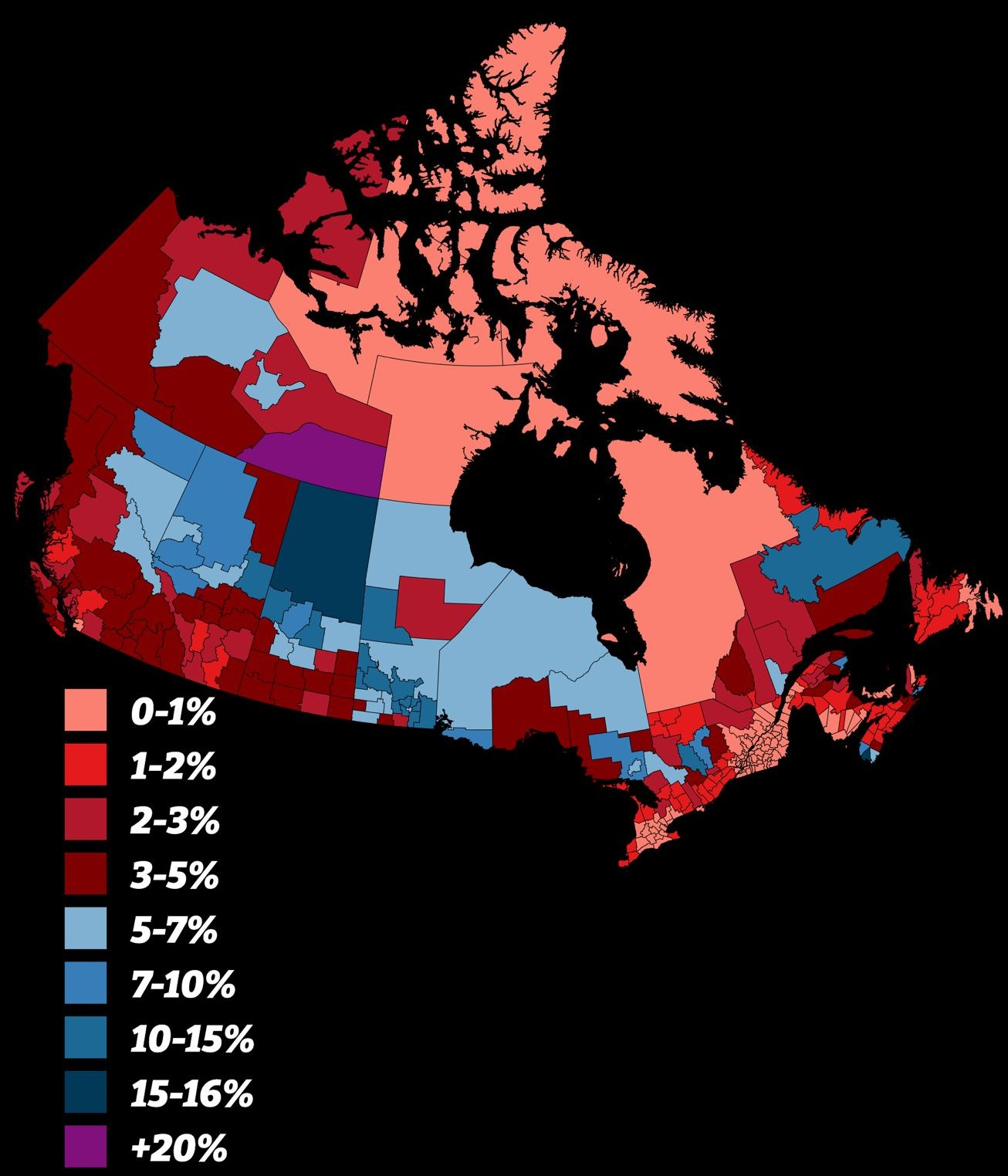
- Population distribution of self-identified Métis Canadians by census division, 2021 census

Total population
- 624,220 (2021)
- Canada: 624,220
- United States: Unknown

Languages
- Michif, Cree, Métis French, North American English, Hand Talk, Bungee, other Indigenous languages

Religion
- Predominantly Christianity (Roman Catholicism and Protestantism)

Métis
- People: Métis
- Language: Michif; Métis French; Hand Talk
- Country: Michif Piyii

The Métis (Note: /mɛˈtiː(s)/ meh-TEE(SS); French: [metis], Canadian French: [meˈt͡sɪs], Michif: [mɪˈt͡ʃɪf]) are a mixed-ancestry Indigenous people whose historical homelands include Canada's three Prairie Provinces extending into parts of Ontario, British Columbia, the Northwest Territories and the northwest United States. They have a shared history and culture, deriving from specific mixed European (primarily French, Scottish, and English) and Indigenous ancestry (primarily Cree with strong kinship to Cree people and communities), which became distinct through ethnogenesis by the mid-18th century, during the early years of the North American fur trade.

In Canada, the Métis, with a population of 624,220 as of 2021, are one of three legally recognized Indigenous peoples in the Constitution Act, 1982, along with the First Nations and Inuit.

The term Métis (uppercase 'M') typically refers to the specific community of people defined as the Métis Nation, which originated largely in the Red River Valley and organized politically in the 19th century, radiating outwards from the Red River Settlement (now Winnipeg). Descendants of this community are known as the Red River Métis. In 1870, the Métis Provisional Government of Louis Riel negotiated the entry of the Red River Settlement into Confederation as the Province of Manitoba, making Manitoba the only province to be founded by an Indigenous person.

Alberta is the only Canadian province with a recognized Métis land base: the eight Métis settlements, with a population of approximately 5,000 people on 1.25 million acres (5,100 km^{2}) and the newer Metis lands near Fort McKay, purchased from the Government of Alberta in 2017.

== Background ==
=== Etymology ===
The word métis itself is originally French for 'person of mixed parentage' and derives from the Latin word mixticius, from mixtus, 'mixed'. It is a cognate of the Spanish term mestizo and Portuguese mestiço.

=== Semantic definitions ===
The definitions and usage of the terms "Métis", "Metis", and "métis" (lowercase) have at times been controversial and contentious; however, there are also legal definitions.

Descendants of English or Scottish and Indigenous were in some cases also historically called "half-breeds" or "Anglo-Métis" or "countryborn". They sometimes adopted a more agrarian culture of subsistence farming and tended to be reared in Protestant denominations.

==== Lowercase 'm' ====
Starting in the 17th century, the French word métis was initially used as a noun by those in the North American fur trade, and by settlers in general, to refer to people of mixed European and North-American Indigenous parentage in New France (which at that time extended from the Maritime provinces through southern Quebec and the Great Lakes to the Mississippi River, thence southward to Mississippi and Alabama). At the time, it applied generally to French-speaking people who were of partial Indigenous and partial ethnic French descent. It also came to be used for people of mixed European and Indigenous backgrounds in other French colonies, generally the children of unions between French men and non-French women from the colonized areas, including Guadeloupe in the Caribbean; Senegal in West Africa; Algeria in North Africa; and the former French Indochina in Southeast Asia.

The first documented "métis" child was a girl born about 1628 near Lake Nipissing, given the first name Marguerite, who was the daughter of a Nipissing woman and Jean Nicollet de Belleborne (born about 1598, likely in Cherbourg, France).

Today, the spelling métis with a lowercase 'm' typically functions as an adjective. The definition of the word has at times been disputed, as some people have attempted to use lower-case métis in the archaic sense of having a single, distant Indigenous ancestor or being in some other way "mixed". Contemporary use of the lowercase métis is controversial, due to confusion with the uppercase form and ongoing territory disputes stemming from equating the presence of mixed ancestry to Métis identity.

==== Uppercase 'M' ====
As French Canadians followed the North American fur trade to the west, some of the settlers made unions with different Indigenous women, including the Cree. Over time, the Métis (uppercase 'M') emerged as a distinct Indigenous people during the late 18th century, with the term referring to a particular sociocultural heritage and an ethnic identification.

In this regard, the term Métis is more than a racial classification and refers to the Métis Nation, an Indigenous peoples in Canada and the United States who originated largely in the Red River Valley and organized politically in the 19th century, developing and dispersing outwards from the Red River Settlement (now Winnipeg). Descendants of this community are therefore also often known as the Red River Métis.

Numerous spellings of Métis have been used interchangeably, including métif, michif; currently the most agreed-upon spelling is Métis; however, some prefer to use Metis as inclusive of persons of both English and French descent.

The majority of Indigenous groups and legal scholars define Métis as the people who originate from the historic homeland of the Métis Nation, which encompasses the Prairie Provinces of Manitoba, Saskatchewan, and Alberta and extends into contiguous parts of Ontario, British Columbia, the Northwest Territories, and the northern United States.

The Métis National Council, in 2002, defined Métis as: "a person who self-identifies as Métis, is distinct from other Aboriginal Peoples, is of historic Métis Nation ancestry and who is accepted by the Métis Nation."

Canadian Geographic's Indigenous Peoples Atlas of Canada identifies Métis people as one of three Canadian Indigenous peoples in the following terms:

Within non-Indigenous society, there are two competing ideas of what being Métis means. The first, when spelled with a lowercase "m" (métis), means individuals or people having mixed-Ancestry parents and ancestries, e.g., North American Indigenous and European/Euro-Canadian/Euro-American. It is a racial categorization. This is the oldest meaning of métis and is based on the French verb métisser [sic], to mix Ancestry or ethnicities. The related noun for the act of Ancestry-mixing is métissage. The second meaning of being Métis, and the one that is embraced by the Métis Nation, relates to a self-defining people with a distinct history in a specific region (Western Canada's prairies) with some spillover into British Columbia, Ontario, North Dakota, Montana and Northwest Territories. In this case, the term Métis is spelled with an uppercase "M" and often, but does not always, contain an accent aigu (é).

The Métis of Canada and the Métis of the United States adopted parts of their Indigenous and European cultures while forming customs and traditions of their own, as well as developing a common language. Some argue that the ethnogenesis of the Métis began when the Métis organized politically at the Battle of Seven Oaks in 1816.

While Michif typically pertains to the language, some Métis people choose to refer to themselves as Michif as an identity.

=== Other groups and individuals ===
Scholars, Métis people, and First Nations elders and community leaders state that only the descendants of the Red River Métis should be constitutionally recognized as Métis people, as they developed a distinct culture as a people historically, and have continued to exist as a distinct culture and community over many generations.

Objections to this stance have been made to the Métis National Council by both individuals and newly formed groups who do not meet the established citizenship criteria. These individuals and unrecognized groups have recently emerged largely in the Maritime, Quebec, and Ontario regions, and are generally referred to as "Eastern Metis". Those objecting usually state that having a single, distant, Indigenous or possibly Indigenous ancestor should be enough to be considered Métis. They also disagree that they should have to meet the resident requirement as defined by the federally recognized Métis organizations. Darryl R. Leroux and Adam Gaudry write:

Since the early 2000s, there has been a meteoric rise in the number of people self-identifying as Métis in Eastern Canada. New census data shows the highest increases in self-reported "Métis" people between 2006 and 2016 were in Québec (149.2 per cent) and in Nova Scotia (124.3 per cent). In Canada during the same period, the increase was less than 60 per cent. Rather than a spike in birth rates, almost all of the increase is due to white Franco-Québécois and Acadian settlers "becoming" Indigenous.

David Chartrand, president of the Manitoba Métis Federation, responding in 2020, said he does not believe these new, self-identified individuals and communities are Métis:

They are not part of us, never were. There is no connection historically in any way or fashion that they can use as even an argument to say that they are part of our nation.

In a 2016 decision, Daniels v Canada (Indian Affairs and Northern Development), the Supreme Court of Canada stated in par. 17:

There is no consensus on who is considered Métis or a non-status Indian, nor need there be. Cultural and ethnic labels do not lend themselves to neat boundaries. 'Métis' can refer to the historic Métis community in Manitoba's Red River Settlement or it can be used as a general term for anyone with mixed European and Aboriginal heritage. Some mixed-ancestry communities identify as Métis, others as Indian.

Indigenous elders from the Miꞌkmaq and other First Nations communities in the Eastern part of Canada, along with recognized Métis leaders, do not agree with this perspective. They say that there is no distinct Metis community or culture in the Maritimes or Quebec, as individuals with mixed ancestry integrated into either Indigenous communities or European settlements instead. They suggest that these newly formed Eastern groups are not legitimate:

"When you're looking at the Maritimes and Quebec, the children of intermarriage were accepted by either party, in our case the Mi'kmaq or the Acadian," Mi'kmaw elder and historian Daniel Paul says. "There was no such thing as a Metis community here in this region."

=== Riel's Métis ===
Quoting Louis Riel from Tremaudan's Histoire de la nation métisse dans l'ouest canadien:

The Métis have as paternal ancestors the former employees of the Hudson's Bay and North-West Companies, and as maternal ancestors Indian women belonging to various tribes.

The French word Métis is derived from the Latin participle mixtus, which means "mixed"; it expresses well the idea it represents.

Quite appropriate also, was the corresponding English term "Half-Breed" in the first generation of blood mixing, but now that European blood and Indian blood are mingled to varying degrees, it is no longer generally applicable.

The French word Métis expresses the idea of this mixture in as satisfactory a way as possible, and becomes by that fact, a proper race name suitable for our race.

A little observation in passing without offending anyone.

Very polite and amiable people, may sometimes say to a Métis, "You don't look at all like a Métis. You surely can't have much Indian blood. Why, you could pass anywhere for pure White."

The Métis, a trifle disconcerted by the tone of these remarks, would like to lay claim to both sides of his origin. But fear of upsetting or totally dispelling these kind assumptions holds him back. While he is hesitating to choose among the different replies that come to mind, words like these succeed in silencing him completely. "Ah! bah! You have scarcely any Indian blood. You haven't enough worth mentioning." Here is how the Métis think privately.

"It is true that our Indian origin is humble, but it is indeed just that we honour our mothers as well as our fathers. Why should we be so preoccupied with what degree of mingling we have of European and Indian blood? No matter how little we have of one or the other, do not both gratitude and filial love require us to make a point of saying, 'We are Métis."

== Métis people in Canada ==
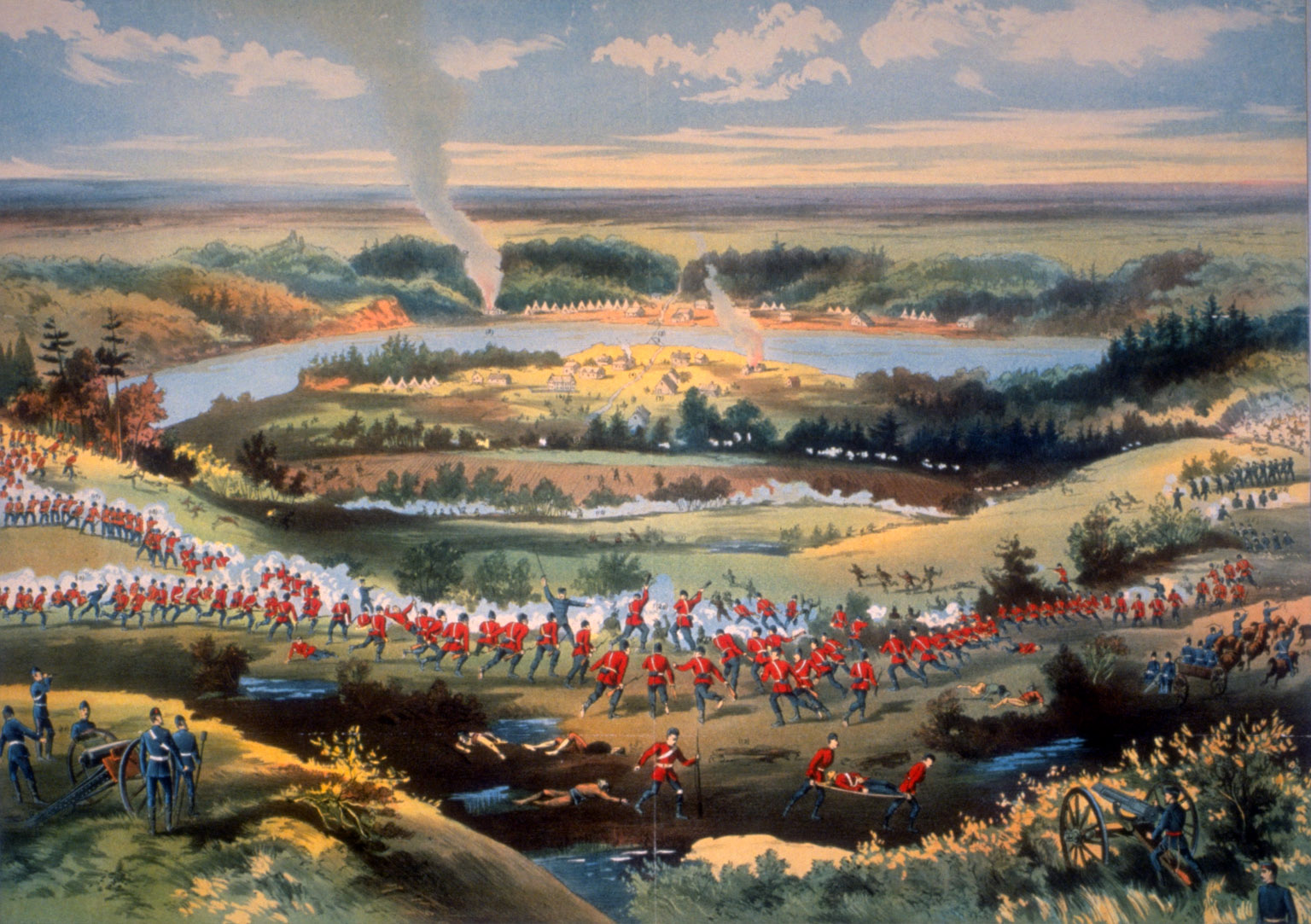
Contemporary lithograph of the Battle of Batoche

Métis people in Canada are specific cultural communities who trace their descent to First Nations and European settlers, primarily the French, in the early decades of the colonization of Canada. Métis peoples are recognized as one of Canada's Indigenous peoples under the Constitution Act of 1982, along with First Nations and Inuit. On April 8, 2014, the Supreme Court of Canada Daniels v Canada appeal held that "Métis and non status Indians are 'Indians' under s. 91(24)," but excluded the Powley test as the only criterion to determine Metis identity.

Canadian Métis represent the majority of people who identify as Métis, although there are a number of Métis in the United States. In Canada, the population is 587,545 with 20.5 percent living in Ontario and 19.5 percent in Alberta. The Acadians of eastern Canada, some of whom have mixed French and Indigenous origins, are not Métis according to Crown–Indigenous Relations and Northern Affairs Canada and other historic Indigenous communities. This viewpoint sees Métis as historically the children of French fur traders and Nehiyaw women of western and west central Canada.

While the Métis initially developed as the mixed-ancestry descendants of early unions between First Nations and colonial-era European settlers (usually Indigenous women and male French settlers), within generations (particularly in central and western Canada), a distinct Métis culture developed. The women in the unions in eastern Canada were usually Algonquin and Ojibwe, and in western Canada they were Saulteaux, Cree, Ojibwe, Nakoda, and Dakota/Lakota or of mixed descent from these peoples. Their unions with European men engaged in the fur trade in the Old Northwest were often of the type known as marriage à la façon du pays ("according to the custom of the country").

After New France was ceded to Great Britain's control in 1763, there was an important distinction between French Métis born of francophone voyageur fathers and the Anglo-Métis (known as "country born" or Mixed Bloods, for instance in the 1870 census of Manitoba) descended from English or Scottish fathers. Today these two cultures have essentially coalesced into location-specific Métis traditions. This does not preclude a range of other Métis cultural expressions across North America. Such polyethnic people were historically referred to by other terms, many of which are now considered to be offensive, such as Mixed-bloods, Half-breeds, Bois-Brûlés, Bungi, Black Scots and Jackatars, the last term from Newfoundland.

While people of Métis culture or heritage are found across Canada, the traditional Métis "homeland" (areas where Métis populations and culture developed as a distinct ethnicity historically) includes much of the present-day Canadian Prairies along with parts of Northwestern Ontario, British Columbia, and the Northwest-Nunavut Territory. The most well-known group are the "Red River Métis", centering on southern and central parts of Manitoba along the Red River of the North.

Closely related are the Métis in the United States, primarily those in border areas such as Northern Michigan, the Red River Valley and Eastern Montana. These were areas in which there was considerable Aboriginal and European mixing due to the 19th-century fur trade. However, they do not have a federally recognized status in the United States, except as enrolled members of federally recognized tribes. Although Métis existed farther west than today's Manitoba, much less is known about the Métis of Northern Canada.

=== Identity ===
==== Self-identity and legal status ====
In 2016, 587,545 people in Canada self-identified as Métis. They represented 35.1% of the total Aboriginal population and 1.5% of the total Canadian population. Most Métis people today are descendants of unions between generations of Métis individuals and live in urban areas. The exception are the Métis in rural and northern parts that exist in close proximity to First Nations communities.

Over the past century, countless Métis have assimilated into the general European Canadian populations. Métis heritage (and thereby Aboriginal ancestry) is more common than is generally realized. People with more distant ancestry, who assimilated into non-Métis society, are not part of the Métis ethnicity or culture.

"What we're seeing is the phenomenon of non-Indigenous people, or those with a very distant ancestry – from the 1600 and 1700s – now claiming that they now have political rights which prevail over those Indigenous nations," said Veldon Coburn, a professor in Indigenous studies at the University of Ottawa and member of the Algonquins of Pikwàkanagàn.

Unlike among First Nations peoples, laws concerning the Métis make no distinction between Treaty status and non-Treaty status. The Métis did not sign treaties with Canada, with the exception of an adhesion to Treaty 3 in Northwest Ontario. This adherence was never implemented by the federal government. The legal definition is not yet fully developed. Section Thirty-five of the Constitution Act, 1982 recognizes the rights of Indian, Métis and Inuit; however, that text does not define these groups. In 2003, the Supreme Court of Canada defined a Métis person as someone who self-identifies as Métis, has an ancestral connection to the historic Métis community, and is accepted by the modern community with continuity to the historic Métis community.

==== View of identity ====
The most well-known and historically documented mixed-ancestry population in Canadian history are the groups who developed during the fur trade in south-eastern Rupert's Land, primarily in the Red River Settlement (now Manitoba) and the Southbranch Settlements (Saskatchewan). In the late 19th century, they organized politically (led by men who had European educations) and had confrontations with the Canadian government in an effort to assert their independence.

This was not the only place where some degree of intermixing (métisser) between European and Indigenous people occurred. It was part of the history of colonization from the earliest days of settlements on the Atlantic Coast throughout the Americas. But the strong sense of ethnic national identity among the mostly French- and Michif-speaking Métis along the Red River, demonstrated during armed resistance movements led by Louis Riel, resulted in a specific use of the term "Métis" throughout Canada.

Continued organizing and political activity resulted in "the Métis" gaining official recognition from the national government as one of the recognized Aboriginal groups in S.35 of the Constitution Act, 1982, which states:

35. (1) The existing aboriginal and treaty rights of the Aboriginal People of Canada are hereby recognized and affirmed.

(2) In this Act, "Aboriginal Peoples of Canada" includes the Indian, Inuit, and Métis Peoples of Canada.

— Constitution Act, 1982

Section 35(2) does not define criteria for an individual who is Métis. This has left open the question of whether "Métis" in this context should apply only to the descendants of the Red River Métis or to all mixed-ancestry groups and individuals. Many members of First Nations may have mixed ancestry but identify primarily by the tribal nation, rather than as Métis.

==== Lack of a legal definition ====
In contrast to the Indian Act, which creates an Indian Register for all (Status) First Nations people, settler-colonial definitions of Métis, Metis and metis have at times been at odds with the definitions of the communities themselves. Some commentators have argued that one of the rights of an Indigenous people is to define their own identity, precluding the need for a government-sanctioned definition.

Alberta is the only province to have defined the term in law under the Métis Settlements Act (MSA), which defines a Métis as "a person of Aboriginal ancestry who identifies with Métis history and culture". This was done in the context of creating a test for legal eligibility for membership in one of Alberta's eight Métis settlements. The MSA, together with requirements at the community level (Elder & community acceptance) create the legal requirements for residency on the Métis Settlements. In Alberta law, belonging to a "Métis Association" (Métis National Council or any of its affiliates, Métis Federation of Canada, Congress of Aboriginal People) does not grant one the rights granted to members of the Alberta Métis Settlements. The MSA test excludes those people who are Status Indians (that is, a member of a First Nation), an exclusion which was upheld by the Supreme Court in Alberta v. Cunningham (2011).

The number of people self-identifying as Métis has risen sharply since the late 20th century: between 1996 and 2006, the population of Canadians who self-identify as Métis nearly doubled, to approximately 390,000. From 2006 to 2016, according to census results from Statistics Canada, those numbers rose by 125% in Nova Scotia, and 150% in Quebec. Also in that time, "Dozens" of new "Metis" organizations appeared, none of whom could demonstrate any ties to continually existing Métis communities.

Until R v. Powley (2003), there was no legal definition of Métis other than the legal requirements found in the Métis Settlements Act of 1990. The Powley case involved a claim by Steven Powley and his son Rodney, two members of the Sault Ste. Marie, Ontario Métis community who were asserting Métis hunting rights. The Supreme Court of Canada outlined three broad factors to identify Métis who have Hunting Rights as Aboriginal peoples:

- self-identification as a Métis individual;
- ancestral connection to an historic Métis community; and
- acceptance by a Métis community.

All three factors must be present for an individual to qualify under the SCC Powley Test, for members of the Métis National Council. The SCC never provided a definition of Métis. The Powley case did not adjudicate all Indigenous inherent rights; analogous rights; or historical Treaty rights. The SCC did state that

[t]he term Métis in s. 35 does not encompass all individuals with mixed Indian and European heritage; rather, it refers to distinctive peoples who, in addition to their mixed ancestry, developed their own customs, ways of life, and recognizable group identity separate from their Indian or Inuit and European forebears. The court was explicit that its ten-point test is not a comprehensive definition of Métis.

Debates as to whether Métis have treaty rights; is an issue created by First Nations. It has been improperly stated that "only First Nations could legitimately sign treaties with the Canadian government so, by definition, Métis have no Treaty rights." However, the term "First Nations" is a recent descriptor created after the Canada Constitution Act 1982. The historic term, used by the Crown in 1850, was "Indian". One historic treaty names Métis in the title: the Halfbreed (Métis in the French version) Adhesion to Treaty 3. Another, the Robinson Superior Treaty of 1850, listed 84 persons classified as "half-breeds" in the Treaty, so included them and their descendants. The present Indian Act remains silent regarding Métis issues. If prior amendments to the Indian Act included Métis, the sections have since been repealed and would be of no force; as they would be irrelevant. Métis Chief Mius signed the annexed Hopson Treaty 1752. This Treaty has been the subject in SCC R. vs. Simon (1985); and R. vs. Marshall ( 1999). In both cases, the SCC confirmed that the Hopson Treaty 1752 is valid and binding. In the 1850 / 1 Upper & Lower Indigenous land laws created by the British Crown, the term "Indian" included all mixed Ancestry Indigenous peoples & their Kin. The discriminatory Indian Act 1876 thereafter split the people & their Kin, as a way to assimilate and cause genocide, which is improper.

==== Definitions used by Métis representative organizations ====
Two main advocacy groups claim to speak for the Métis in Canada: the Congress of Aboriginal Peoples (CAP) and the Métis National Council (MNC). Each uses different approaches to define Métis individuals. The CAP, which has nine regional affiliates, represents all Indigenous peoples in Canada who are living off-reserve, including Métis and non-Status Indians. It does not provide a definition of "Métis", but instead leaves each affiliate determine its own membership criteria.

Due to the exclusion of a Métis representative among the Native Council of Canada's two seats at the Constitutional Conference in 1983, the Manitoba Métis Federation (MMF), the Association of Métis and Non-Status Indians of Saskatchewan (AMNSIS) and the Métis Association of Alberta (MAA) withdrew from the NCC (CAP's predecessor) and formed the Métis National Council. Its political leadership of the time stated that the NCC's "pan-Aboriginal approach to issues did not allow the Métis Nation to effectively represent itself". The MNC views the Métis as a single nation with a common history and culture centred on the fur trade of "west-central North America" in the eighteenth and nineteenth centuries. In their Court Intervening submissions, the MNC admitted that it could only present the claims of its members. Each competing Nation can and does, have different Constitutions.

In 2003, MNC had five provincial affiliates:

- Métis Nation of Ontario
- Manitoba Métis Federation
- Métis Nation—Saskatchewan
- Métis Nation of Alberta (formerly the Métis Association of Alberta)
- Métis Nation of British Columbia

The MNA adopted the following "Definition of Métis":

Métis means a person who self-identifies as a Métis, is distinct from other aboriginal peoples, is of historic Métis Nation ancestry, and is accepted by the Métis Nation.

Several local, independent Métis organizations have been founded in Canada. In Northern Canada neither the CAP nor the MNC have affiliates; here local Métis organizations deal directly with the federal government and are part of the Aboriginal land claims process. Three of the comprehensive settlements (modern treaties) in force in the Northwest Territories include benefits for Métis people who can prove local Aboriginal ancestry prior to 1921 (Treaty 11).

The federal government recognizes the Métis National Council as the representative Métis group. In December 2016, Prime Minister Justin Trudeau made a commitment to the leaders of the Assembly of First Nations, the Inuit Tapiriit Kanatami, and the Métis National Council to have annual meetings. He also committed to two other initiatives aimed at heeding the Calls to Action of the Truth and Reconciliation Commission (TRC) which examined abuses at Indian Residential Schools.

Indigenous Affairs Canada, the relevant federal ministry, deals with the MNC. On April 13, 2017, the two parties signed the Canada-Métis Nation Accord, with the goal of working with the Métis Nation, as represented by the Métis National Council, on a Nation to Nation basis. The Crown openly mandated to engage with MNC & MMF via distinctions. However, in several United Nations instruments binding the Federal Crown, all distinctions are discrimination. Thus the MNC & MMF have advanced their positions & obtained funding via discrimination. The UN instruments are tantamount to international treaties.

In response to the Powley decision, Métis organizations are issuing Métis Nation citizenship cards to their members. Several organizations are registered with the Canadian government to provide Métis cards. The criteria to receive a card and the rights associated with the card vary with each organization. For example, for membership in the MNA, an applicant must provide a documented genealogy and family tree dating to the mid-1800s, proving descent from one or more members of historic Métis groups.

==== Cultural definitions ====
Cultural definitions of Métis identity inform legal and political ones.

The 1996 Report of the Royal Commission on Aboriginal Peoples stated:

'Métis' means a person who self-identifies as Métis, is distinct from other Aboriginal peoples, is of historic Métis Nation Ancestry and who is accepted by the Métis Nation. Many Canadians have mixed Aboriginal/non-Aboriginal ancestry, but that does not make them Métis or even Aboriginal … What distinguishes Métis people from everyone else is that they associate themselves with a culture that is distinctly Métis.

Traditional markers of Métis culture include use of Aboriginal-European languages, such as Michif (French-Cree-Dene) and Bungi (Cree-Ojibwa-English); distinctive clothing, such as the arrowed sash (ceinture flêchée); a rich repertoire of fiddle music, jigs and square dances, and practising a traditional economy based on hunting, trapping, and gathering. However, these cultural markers do not exclude Métis that do not partake in them.

=== Canadian history ===
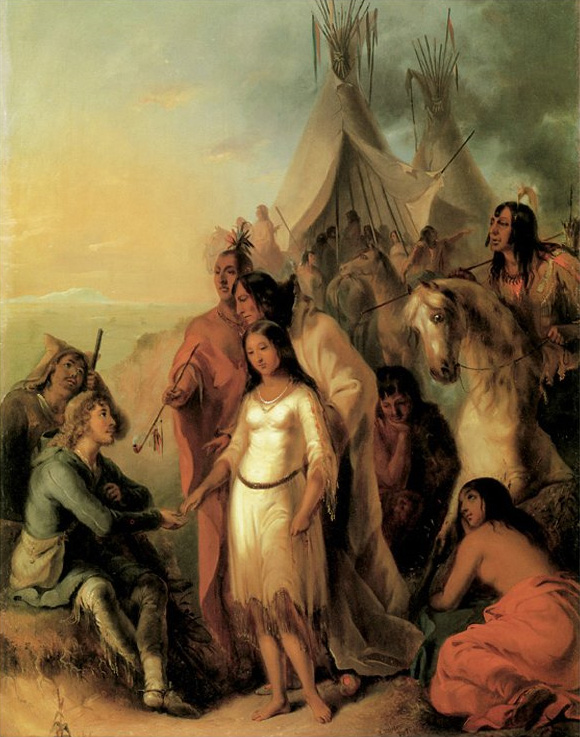
The Trapper's Bride by Alfred Jacob Miller, 1837

During the height of the North American fur trade in New France from 1650 onward, many French and British fur traders married First Nations and Inuit women, mainly Cree, Ojibwa or Saulteaux located in the Great Lakes area and later into the north west. The majority of these fur traders were French and Scottish; the French majority were Catholic. These marriages are commonly referred to as marriage à la façon du pays or marriage according to the "custom of the country."

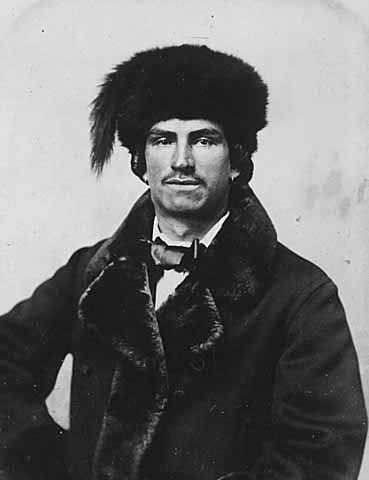
Métis fur trader, c. 1870

At first, the Hudson's Bay Company officially forbade these relationships. However, many Indigenous peoples actively encouraged them, because they drew fur traders into Indigenous kinship circles, creating social ties that supported the economic relationships developing between them and Europeans. When Indigenous women married European men, they introduced them to their people and their culture, taught them about the land and its resources, and worked alongside them. Indigenous women paddled and steered canoes, made moccasins out of moose skin, netted webbing for snowshoes, skinned animals and dried their meat for pemmican, split and dried fish, snared rabbits and partridges, and helped to manufacture birchbark canoes. Intermarriage made the fur trade more successful.

The children of these marriages were often introduced to Catholicism, but grew up in primarily First Nations societies. They were thought of as the familial bond between the Europeans and First Nations and Inuit of North America. As adults, the men often worked as fur-trade company interpreters, as well as fur trappers in their turn. Many of the first generations of Métis lived within the First Nations societies of their wives and children, but also started to marry Métis women.

By the early 19th century, marriage between European fur traders and First Nations or Inuit women started to decline as European fur traders began to marry Métis women instead, because Métis women were familiar with both white and Indigenous cultures, and could interpret.

According to historian Jacob A. Schooley, the Métis developed over at least two generations and within different economic classes. In the first stage, "servant" (employee) traders of the fur trade companies, known as wintering partners, would stay for the season with First Nations bands, and make a "country marriage" with a high-status native woman. This woman and her children would move to live in the vicinity of a trading fort or post, becoming "House Indians" (as they were called by the company men). House Indians eventually formed distinct bands. Children raised within these "House Indian" bands often became employees of the companies. (Foster cites the York boat captain Paulet Paul as an example). Eventually this second-generation group ended employment with the company and became commonly known as "freemen" traders and trappers. They lived with their families raising children in a distinct culture, accustomed to the fur-trade life, that valued free trading and the buffalo hunt in particular. He considered that the third generation, who were sometimes Métis on both sides, were the first true Métis. He suggests that in the Red River region, many "House Indians" (and some non-"House" First Nations) were assimilated into Métis culture due to the Catholic church's strong presence in that region. In the Fort Edmonton region, however, many House Indians never adopted a Métis identity but continued to identify primarily as Cree, Saulteaux, Ojibwa, and Chipweyan descendants up until the early 20th century. The Métis played a vital role in the success of the western fur trade. They were skilled hunters and trappers, and were raised to appreciate both Aboriginal and European cultures. Métis understanding of both societies and customs helped bridge cultural gaps, resulting in better trading relationships. The Hudson's Bay Company discouraged unions between their fur traders and First Nations and Inuit women, while the North West Company (the English-speaking Quebec-based fur trading company) supported such marriages. Trappers often married First Nations women too, and operated outside company structures. The Métis peoples were respected as valuable employees of both fur trade companies, due to their skills as voyageurs, bison hunters, and interpreters, and for their knowledge of the lands.

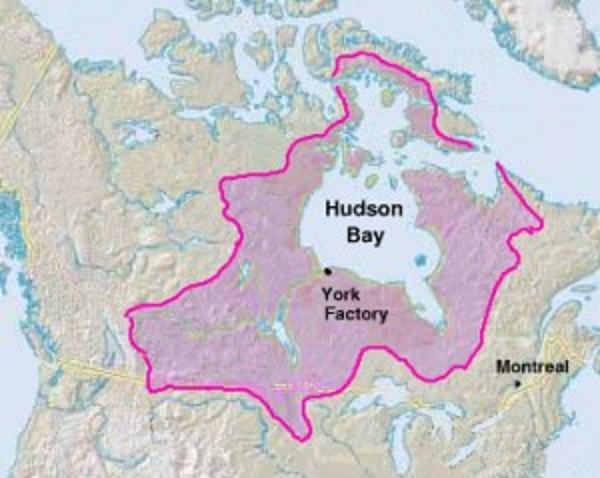
Rupert's Land, showing location of York Factory

By the early 19th century, European immigrants, mainly Scottish farmers, along with Métis families from the Great Lakes region moved to the Red River Valley in present-day Manitoba. The Hudson's Bay Company, which now administered a monopoly over the territory then called Rupert's Land, assigned plots of land to European settlers. The allocation of Red River land caused conflict with those already living in the area, as well as with the North West Company, whose trade routes had been cut in half. Many Métis were working as fur traders with both the North West Company and the Hudson's Bay Company. Others were working as free traders, or buffalo hunters supplying pemmican to the fur trade. The buffalo were declining in number, and the Métis and First Nations had to go farther and further west to hunt them. Profits from the fur trade were declining because of a reduction in European demand due to changing tastes, as well as the need for the Hudson's Bay Company to extend its reach farther from its main posts to get furs.

Most references to the Métis in the 19th century applied to the Plains Métis, but more particularly the Red River Métis. But, the Plains Métis tended to identify by occupational categories: buffalo hunters, pemmican and fur traders, and "tripmen" in the York boat fur brigades among the men; the moccasin sewers and cooks among the women. The largest community in the Assiniboine-Red River district had a different lifestyle and culture from those Métis located in the Saskatchewan, Alberta, Athabasca, and Peace river valleys to the west.

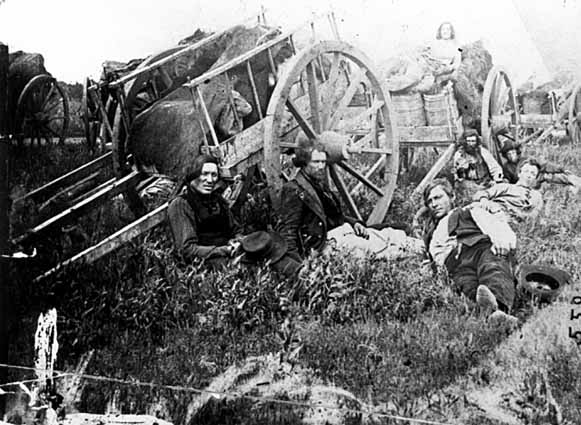
Métis drivers with Red River carts, c. 1860

In 1869, two years after Canadian Confederacy, the Government of Canada exerted its power over the people living in Rupert's Land after it acquired the land in the mid-19th century from the Hudson's Bay Company. The Métis and the Anglo-Métis (commonly known as Countryborn, children of First Nations women and Orcadian, other Scottish or English men), joined forces to stand up for their rights. They wanted to protect their traditional ways of life against an aggressive and distant Anglo-Canadian government and its local colonizing agents. An 1870 census of Manitoba classified the population as follows: 11,963 total people. Of this number 558 were defined as Indians (First Nations). There were 5,757 Métis and 4,083 English-speaking Mixed Bloods. The remaining 1,565 people were of predominately European, Canadian or American background.

During this time the Canadian government signed treaties (known as the "Numbered Treaties") with various First Nations. These Nations ceded property rights to almost the entire western plains to the Government of Canada. In return for their ceding traditional lands, the Canadian government promised food, education, medical help, etc. While the Métis generally did not sign any treaty as a group, they were sometimes included, even listed as "half-breeds" in some records.

In the late 19th century, following the British North America Act (1867), Louis Riel, a Métis who was formally educated, became a leader of the Métis in the Red River area. He denounced the Canadian government surveys on Métis lands in a speech delivered in late August 1869 in front of Saint Boniface Cathedral. The Métis became more fearful when the Canadian government appointed the notoriously anti-French William McDougall as the Lieutenant Governor of the Northwest Territories on September 28, 1869, in anticipation of a formal transfer of lands to take effect in December. On November 2, 1869, Louis Riel and 120 men seized Upper Fort Garry, the administrative headquarters of the Hudson's Bay Company. This was the first overt act of Métis resistance. On March 4, 1870, the Provisional Government, led by Louis Riel, executed Thomas Scott after Scott was convicted of insubordination and treason. The elected Legislative Assembly of Assiniboia subsequently sent three delegates to Ottawa to negotiate with the Canadian government. This resulted in the Manitoba Act and that province's entry into the Canadian Confederation. Due to the execution of Scott, Riel was charged with murder and fled to the United States in exile.

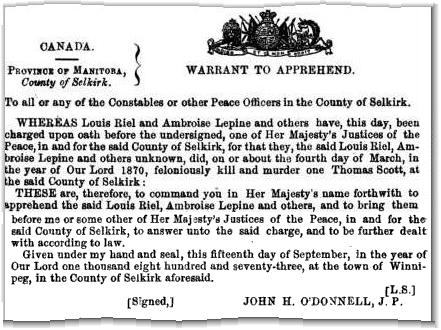
Copy of the "Warrant to Apprehend" Riel and Lépine, issued in Winnipeg

In March 1885, the Métis heard that a contingent of 500 North-West Mounted Police was heading west. They organized and formed the Provisional Government of Saskatchewan, with Pierre Parenteau as president and Gabriel Dumont as adjutant-general. Riel took charge of a few hundred armed men. They suffered defeat by Canadian militia battalions and North West Mounted Police in a conflict known as the North-West Resistance, which occurred in northern Saskatchewan from March 26 to May 12, 1885. Gabriel Dumont fled to the United States, while Riel, Poundmaker, and Big Bear surrendered. Big Bear and Poundmaker each were convicted and received a three-year sentence. On July 6, 1885, Riel was convicted of high treason and was sentenced to hang. Riel appealed but he was executed on November 16, 1885.

=== Culture ===
==== Language ====
A majority of the Métis once spoke, and many still speak, either Métis French or an Indigenous language such as Cree, Anishinaabemowin, Denésoliné, etc. A few in some regions spoke a mixed language called Michif which is composed of Plains Cree verbs and French nouns. Michif, Mechif or Métchif is a phonetic spelling of the Métis pronunciation of Métif, a variant of Métis. The Métis today predominantly speak Canadian English, with Canadian French a strong second language, as well as numerous Aboriginal tongues.

Michif is most used in the United States, notably in the Turtle Mountain Indian Reservation of North Dakota. There Michif is the official language of the Métis who reside on this Ojibwe (Chippewa) reservation. After years of decline in use of these languages, the provincial Métis councils are encouraging their revival, use in communities and teaching in schools. The encouragement and use of Métis French and Michif is growing due to outreach after at least a generation of decline.

The 19th-century community of Anglo-Métis, more commonly known as Countryborn, were children of people in the Rupert's Land fur trade; they were typically of Orcadian, other Scottish, or English paternal descent and Aboriginal maternal descent. Their first languages would have been Aboriginal (Cree language, Saulteaux language, Assiniboine language, etc.) and English. The Gaelic and Scots spoken by Orcadians and other Scots became part of the creole language referred to as "Bungee".

==== Flag ====
The blue Métis flag.

The red Métis flag.

The Métis flag is one of the oldest patriotic flags originating in Canada. The Métis have two flags. Both flags use the same design of a central infinity symbol, but are different colours. The first red flag was flown by Cuthbert Grant in 1815 near Fort Espérance alongside the North-West Company (an unsubstantiated rumour reported by James Sutherland claimed that it was a gift from the North-West Company, but no evidence corroborates this). Days before the Battle of Seven Oaks, "La Grenouillère" in 1816, Peter Fidler recorded Cuthbert Grant flying the blue flag. The red and blue are not cultural or linguistic identifiers and do not represent the companies.

==== Cultural genocide ====
In 2019, the final report, Reclaiming Power and Place, by the National Inquiry into Missing and Murdered Indigenous Women and Girls stated "The violence the National Inquiry heard amounts to a race-based genocide of Indigenous Peoples, including First Nations, Inuit and Métis, which especially targets women and girls."

=== Land ownership ===
Issues of land ownership became a central theme, as the Métis sold most of the 600,000 acres (2430 km^{2}) they received in the first settlement.

During the 1930s, political activism arose in Métis communities in Alberta and Saskatchewan over land rights, and some filed land claims for the return of certain lands. Five men, sometimes dubbed "The Famous Five", (James P. Brady, Malcolm Norris, Peter Tomkins Jr., Joe Dion, Felix Callihoo) were instrumental in having the Alberta government form the 1934 "Ewing Commission", headed by Albert Ewing, to deal with land claims The Alberta government passed the Métis Population Betterment Act in 1938. The Act provided funding and land to the Métis. (The provincial government later rescinded portions of the land in certain areas.)

In 1972, the Red River Point Society began leasing land around the community of Fort McKay, Alberta on behalf of the Metis community there. In 2017, the Fort McKay local of the Metis Nation of Alberta purchased some land outright.

=== Distribution ===
According to the 2016 Canada Census, a total of 587,545 individuals self-identified as Métis. However, it is doubtful that all such individuals would meet the objective tests laid out in the Supreme Court decisions Powley and Daniels and therefore qualify as "Métis" for the purposes of Canadian law. Data from this section is from the 2016 Canadian Census by Statistics Canada.

Canadians identifying as Métis
Province / territory	Percentage of self-identified Métis (out of total population)
Newfoundland and Labrador	1.5%
Prince Edward Island	0.6%
Nova Scotia	2.8%
New Brunswick	1.5%
Quebec	0.8%
Ontario	1.0%
Manitoba	7.3%
Saskatchewan	5.2%
Alberta	2.9%
British Columbia	2.0%
Yukon	2.9%
Northwest Territories	7.1%
Nunavut	0.5%
Canada total	1.7%

=== Métis settlements of Alberta ===
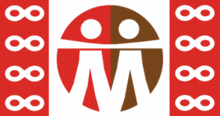
A flag used by the Federation of Métis Settlements. National symbols in settlements are common, such as the motto "Our People, Our Land, Our Culture, Our Future"

The Métis settlements in Alberta are the only recognized land base of Métis in Canada. They are represented and governed collectively by a unique Métis government known as the Métis Settlements General Council (MSGC), also known as the "All-Council". The MSGC is the provincial, national, and international representative of the Federated Métis Settlements. It holds fee simple land title via Letters Patents to 1.25 million acres (5060 km^{2}) of land, making the MSGC the largest land holder in the province, other than the Crown in the Right of Alberta. The MSGC is the only recognized Métis Government in Canada with prescribed land, power, and jurisdiction via the Métis Settlements Act. (This legislation followed legal suits filed by the Métis Settlements against the Crown in the 1970s).

The Métis settlements consist of predominantly Indigenous Métis populations native to Northern Alberta – distinct from those of the Red River. However, following the Riel and Dumont resistances some Red-River Métis fled westward, where they married into the contemporary Métis settlement populations during the end of the 19th century and into the early 20th century. Historically referred to as the "Nomadic Half-breeds", the Métis of Northern Alberta have a unique history. Their fight for land is still evident today with the eight contemporary Métis settlements.

Following the formal establishment of the Métis settlements, then called Half-Breed Colonies, in the 1930s by a distinct Métis political organization, the Métis populations in Northern Alberta were the only Métis to secure communal Métis lands. During renewed Indigenous activism during the 1960s into the 1970s, political organizations were formed or revived among the Métis. In Alberta, the Métis settlements united as: The "Alberta Federation of Métis Settlement Associations" in the mid-1970s. Today, the Federation is represented by the Métis Settlements General Council.

During the constitutional talks of 1982, the Métis were recognized as one of the three Aboriginal peoples of Canada, in part by the Federation of Métis Settlements. In 1990, the Alberta government, following years of conferences and negotiations between the Federation of Métis Settlements (FMS) and the Crown in the Right of Alberta, restored land titles to the northern Métis communities through the Métis Settlement Act, replacing the Métis Betterment Act. Originally, the first Métis settlements in Alberta were called colonies and consisted of:

- Buffalo Lake (Caslan) or Beaver River
- Cold Lake
- East Prairie (south of Lesser Slave Lake)
- Elizabeth (east of Elk Point)
- Fishing Lake (Packechawanis)
- Gift Lake (Ma-cha-cho-wi-se) or Utikuma Lake
- Goodfish Lake
- Kikino
- Kings Land
- Marlboro
- Paddle Prairie (or Keg River)
- Peavine (Big Prairie, north of High Prairie)
- Touchwood
- Wolf Lake (north of Bonnyville)

In the 1960s, the settlements of Marlboro, Touchwood, Cold Lake, and Wolf Lake were dissolved by Order-in-Council by the Alberta Government. The remaining Métis Settlers were forced to move into one of the eight remaining Métis Settlements – leaving the eight contemporary Métis Settlements.

The position of Federal Interlocutor for Métis and Non-Status Indians was created in 1985 as a portfolio in the Canadian Cabinet. The Department of Indian Affairs and Northern Development is officially responsible only for Status Indians and largely with those living on Indian reserves. The new position was created in order provide a liaison between the federal government and Métis and non-status Aboriginal peoples, urban Aboriginals, and their representatives.

== Organizations in Canada ==
=== Pre-Batoche ===
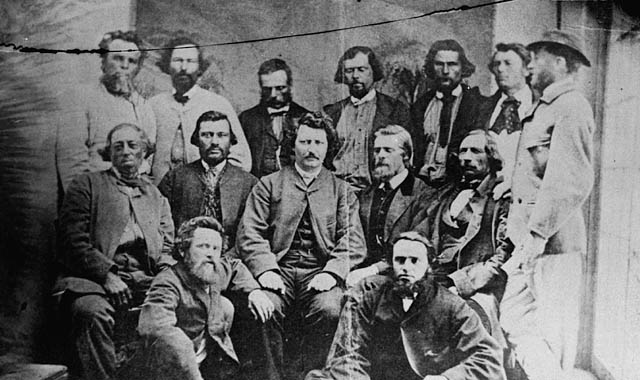
Councillors of the Métis Provisional Government, 1870. Louis Riel sits in the centre.

The Provisional Government of Saskatchewan was the name given by Louis Riel to the independent state he declared during the North-West Rebellion (Resistance) of 1885 in what is today the Canadian province of Saskatchewan. The governing council was named the Exovedate, Latin for 'of the flock'. The council debated issues ranging from military policy to local bylaws and theological issues. It met at Batoche, Saskatchewan, and exercised real authority only over the Southbranch Settlement. The provisional government collapsed that year after the Battle of Batoche.

=== Métis Nation of Alberta (1928) ===
In the 1920s, Métis in the Cold Lake area of Alberta were concerned about the federal government's decision to transfer control of natural resources to the province and its impact on Métis living on Crown land. The "Métis Famous Five" thereby founded the Association des Métis Alberta et les Territoires du Nord-Ouest in 1928 as the first stable Métis organization in Alberta that could advocate to the provincial government there.

In 1932, the Association was organized more formally and became the Métis Association of Alberta (MAA), including 31 locals across Alberta.

Joe Dion, Malcolm Norris, and Adrian Hope, as well as other Métis leaders, successfully lobbied the provincial government, In 1934, the Ewing Commission was formed to investigate Métis issues, which in turn resulted in the Métis Population Betterment Act and the creation of the Metis Settlements.

The MAA would later be renamed as the Métis Nation of Alberta (MNA).

In February 2020, the Alberta Métis Federation was founded to represent six local Métis communities in Alberta that had separated from the MNA.

=== Manitoba Métis Federation (1967) ===
The Manitoba Métis Federation (MMF), founded in 1967, is the only officially recognized Métis Government in Canada.

On July 6, 2021, the MMF signed the Manitoba Métis Self-Government Recognition and Implementation Agreement with the Government of Canada at Upper Fort Garry, which provided immediate recognition of the MMF as the democratically elected Métis Government for the Red River Métis.

In September 2021, the MMF withdrew from the Métis National Council, due to that organization's failure to uphold the 2002 nationally accepted definition of Métis.

=== Congress of Aboriginal Peoples (1971) ===
The Native Council of Canada was founded in 1971 as a pan-Indigenous umbrella group that included member organizations that represented all off-reserve First Nations as well as the Métis. In 1983, many of its Western Metis members split off to form the Métis National Council. The Native Council of Canada continues today as the Congress of Aboriginal Peoples (CAP) and its nine regional affiliates represent all Aboriginal people who are not part of the reserve system, including Métis and non-Status Indians.

=== Metis National Council (1983) ===
The Métis National Council was formed in 1983, following the recognition of the Métis as "aboriginal peoples of Canada," in Section Thirty-five of the Constitution Act, 1982. The MNC was a member of the World Council of Indigenous Peoples (WCIP).

In 1997 the Métis National Council was granted NGO Consultative Status with the United Nations Economic and Social Council. The MNC's first ambassador to this group was Clément Chartier. MNC is a founding member of the American Council of Indigenous Peoples (ACIP).

The Métis National Council is currently composed of four provincial Métis organizations, though numbers have varied over time. namely,

- Métis Nation of Alberta
- Métis Nation British Columbia
- Métis Nation-Saskatchewan
- Métis Nation of Ontario

The National Council holds province-wide ballot box elections for political positions in these associations, held at regular intervals, for regional and provincial leadership. Métis citizens and their communities are represented and participate in these Métis governance structures by way of elected Locals or Community Councils, as well as provincial assemblies held annually.

There used to be five groups, but in September 2021, the Manitoba Metis Federation left over membership issues involving the Métis Nation of Ontario (MNO), with President David Chartrand citing issues of the Council accepting the MNO despite the MNO having "nearly 80 per cent non-Métis Nation Citizens in their registry." The Métis National Council has stated that they reject the idea of new Ontario Métis communities, and in 2020 they suspended the membership of the MNO due to concerns that 90% of the MNOs registered members did not fulfill the requirements of citizenship put in place by the National Council in 2002, notably the requirement for an ancestral link to the Métis homelands and the Red River area specifically.

"On March 22, 2022, in response to Chartrand's comments on MNO suspension, President Margaret Froh stated her position that, "The MNO was never suspended, the MNO was on probation and there was a decision by just a few individuals declaring that the MNO was suspended when in fact that wasn't correct and in fact we (MNO) went to court and the court concluded we were not suspended." The Ontario group had granted memberships to people from four disputed communities: Mattawa, Georgian Bay, Killarney, and Temiskaming, claiming these groups consist of Métis people, and not simply regions inhabited by First Nations individuals and some settlers, but without cultural ties to the recognized Métis communities. When the suspension was announced, a motion was passed to create a panel of experts, including representatives from the four Métis Nation governments (including MNO), to "gather information and present findings and recommendations" on how to proceed.

=== Canadian Métis Council ===
The Canadian Métis Council was established in 1997 to further the economic, political, spiritual and cultural aspirations of Canada's Métis people. The Canadian Métis Council comprises over 50 community councils and affiliate Métis organizations in every province of Canada. Governed by a board of directors, the Canadian Métis Council is a non-profit corporation concerned with cultural issues, harvesting rights, education, health, youth, justice and other related issues that directly effect the Métis people of North America.

=== Ontario Métis Aboriginal Association ===
The Woodland Métis are not affiliated with the Métis Nation of Ontario (MNO). MNO President Tony Belcourt said in 2005 that he did not know who OMAA members are, but that they are not Métis.

In a Supreme Court of Canada appeal (Document C28533, page 17), the federal government states that "membership in OMAA and/or MNO does not establish membership in the specific local aboriginal community for the purposes of establishing a s. 35 [Indigenous and treaty] right. Neither OMAA nor the MNO constitute the sort of discrete, historic and site-specific community contemplated by Van der Peet capable of holding a constitutionally protected aboriginal right". (See: Other groups and individuals)

== Métis people in the United States ==
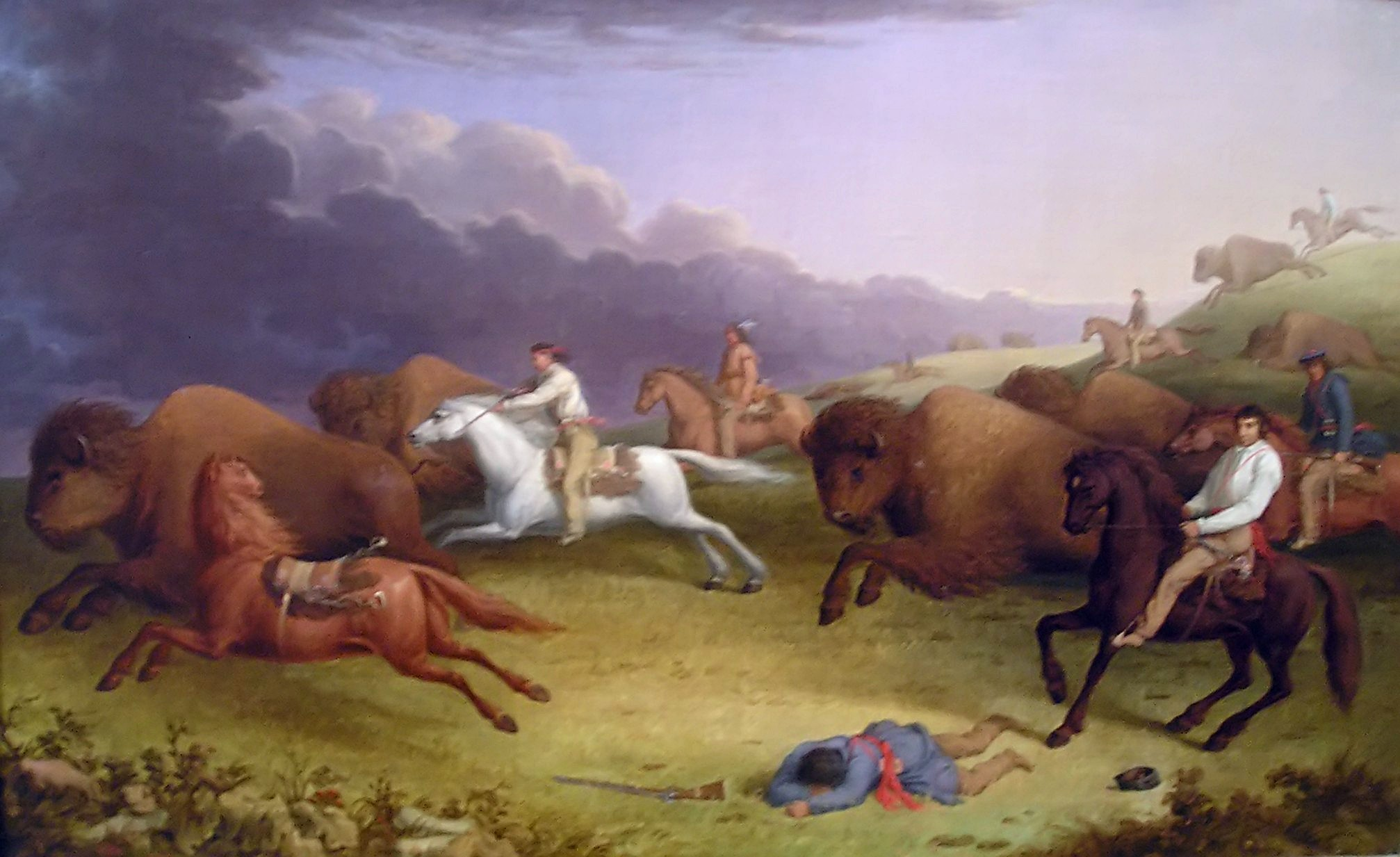
Paul Kane's oil painting Half-Breeds Running Buffalo, depicting a Métis buffalo hunt on the prairies of Dakota in June 1846

Métis people in the United States are a specific culture and community, who descend from unions between Native American and early European colonist parents – usually Indigenous women who married French, and later Scottish or English, men, who worked as fur trappers and traders during the 17th to 19th centuries in the fur trade era. The women were usually Algonquian, Ojibwe and Cree. They developed as an ethnic and cultural group from the descendants of these unions.

In the French colonies, people of mixed Indigenous and French ancestry were referred to by those who spoke French as métis, meaning "mixture." Being bilingual, these people were able to trade European goods, such as muskets, for the furs and hides at a trading post. These Métis were found throughout the Great Lakes area and to the west, in the Rocky Mountains. While the word in this usage originally had no ethnic designation (and was not capitalized in English), it grew to describe a specific ethnicity by the early 19th century. This use (of simply meaning "mixed") excludes mixed-Ancestry people born of unions in other settings or more recently than about 1870.

Fewer Métis live in the U.S. than in Canada. During the early colonial era, people moved easily back and forth through Canada and the other British colonies.

=== Geography ===
With exploration, settlement, and exploitation of resources by French and British fur trading interests across North America, European men often had relationships and sometimes marriages with Native American women. Often both sides felt such marriages were beneficial in strengthening the fur trade. Indigenous women often served as interpreters and could introduce their men to their people. Because many Native Americans and First Nations often had matrilineal kinship systems, the mixed-Ancestry children were considered born to the mother's clan and usually raised in her culture. Few were educated in European schools.

The métis children who did attempt to integrate into European societies faced many issues with trying to gain citizenship within these early settlements. Their success often related to their European father's status; fur traders, rather than trappers, were more settled men of capital and more likely to acquire education for their mixed-Ancestry children.

The métis men in the northern tier typically worked in the fur trade and later hunting and as guides. The métis based in Red River Colony eventually settled throughout the Canadian Prairies as a distinct ethnic group with its own culture known as the Métis.

=== United States history ===
Between 1795 and 1815, a network of Métis settlements and trading posts was established throughout what is now the US states of Michigan and to a lesser extent in Illinois and Indiana.

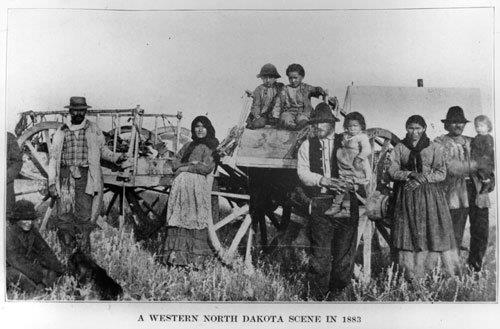
A Metis family poses with their Red River carts in a field in western North Dakota. (1883) State Historical Society of North Dakota (A4365)

There were also smaller communities throughout what had been New France such as the French-Quapaw communities of Arkansas which had sometimes been referred to as metis, but following the Louisiana Purchase would commonly be referred to as "mixed bloods".

After the War of 1812, the US prohibited British (including Scots) traders from Canada participating in the fur trade south of the border, disrupting longstanding practices. During the early days of territorial Michigan, Métis and ethnic French played a dominant role in elections, as they had been established there long before the United States was formed. It was largely with Métis support that Gabriel Richard was elected as delegate to Congress.

After Michigan was admitted as a state and, under pressure of increased numbers of European-American settlers from eastern states, many Métis migrated westward into the Canadian Prairies, including the Red River Colony and the Southbranch Settlement. By the late 1830s only in the area of Sault Ste. Marie, which had long been a center of fur trading and more cosmopolitan interracial encounter, was there recognition of the Métis as significant members of the community.

In the 1840s, Métis peoples were making historical impacts in developing parts of the United States. One significant example is Pierre Parrant, who established the first business in what is now the city of Saint Paul, Minnesota, the capital of the state.

A large group of Métis from the Pembina region hunted in Montana in the 1860s, eventually forming an agricultural settlement in the Judith Basin by 1880. This settlement eventually disintegrated, with most Métis leaving, or identifying more strongly either as "white" or "Indian".

Métis often participated in interracial marriages. The French, particularly, viewed these marriages as sensible and realistic. Americans, however, viewed interracial marriages as unsound based on their ideas of racial purity. Although marriage to Native Americans was legal, some parts of American society believed that the spouse of the highest social class lost status by such marriage, as did their children. In frontier areas, these ideas were less important.

The French, however, had encouraged fur traders to participate in interracial marriages with Indians as they were beneficial to the fur trade business and also to spread religion. Generally speaking, these marriages were happy ones, that lasted and brought together differing groups of people and benefitted the fur trade business.

=== Current population ===
Mixed-Ancestry people live throughout Canada and the northern United States. Relatively few in the US identify ethnically and culturally as Métis, as it was based north of the border in Red River country. A strong Prairie Métis identity exists in the Métis Homeland which occupied most of Rupert's Land.

Métis or their descendants also live in Minnesota, Montana and North Dakota. A number of self-identified Métis live in North Dakota, mostly in Pembina County. Many members of the Turtle Mountain Band of Chippewa Indians (a federally recognized Tribe) identify as Métis or Michif rather than as strictly Ojibwe.

Many Métis families are recorded in the U.S. Census for the historic Métis settlement areas along the Detroit and St. Clair rivers, Mackinac Island and Sault Ste. Marie, Michigan.

Métis persons generally have not organized as an ethnic or political group in the United States as they have in Canada, where they had armed confrontations and have gained status rights as a recognized aboriginal group.

The first "Conference on the Métis in North America" was held in Chicago in 1981, after increasing research about this people. This also was a period of increased appreciation for different ethnic groups and reappraisal of the histories of settlement of North America.

Papers at the conference focused on "becoming Métis", and the role of history in formation of this ethnic group, defined in Canada as having Aboriginal status. The Metis peoples and their history continue to be extensively studied, especially by scholars in Canada and the United States.

=== Louis Riel and the United States ===
Riel had a significant influence on the Métis community in Canada, especially in the Manitoba region. However, he also had a distinct relationship with the Métis in the United States who were related to the Canadian base. He had entered the US and was an American citizen when he was captured. He was returned to Canada where he was convicted of treason for earlier actions and executed. Riel attempted to lead those of the Métis community in the United States who were related to the Red River region, and contributed to the defence of Métis rights.

On October 22, 1844, Louis Riel was born in the Red River settlement known as the territory of Assiniboia. He was born with French background; however, as the Métis are a mobile community, he travelled a lot and had a transitional identity, meaning he would often cross the Canada and United States border. During the 19th century, there were few American-born citizens living in Red River.

On November 22, 1869, Riel went to Winnipeg to discuss the rights of the Métis community with Governor McDougall. At the end of the settlement, McDougall agreed to guarantee a "List of Rights". It also incorporated four clauses of the Dakota bill of rights. This Bill of rights was the rise of the American influence during the Red River Métis resistance and was an important milestone in Métis justice.

The following years were a time of conflict between the government in charge and the Métis people. Métis leaders, such as Louis Riel, were crossing the border without what the colonial government saw as proper notice. This caused repercussions for Riel, who was wanted by the Ontario government. He was later accused of the Scott Death, a murder case. By 1874, there was a warrant out for his arrest in Winnipeg. Because of the warrant charges in Canada, Riel believed that the United States was a safer territory for him and the Métis people. He went into exile in the US.

Riel struggled with mental health problems and sought proper treatment in the American northeast from 1875 to 1878. Once better, he decided to obtain an American residence and complete the liberation of the Métis people that he first started in 1869. Riel wanted to gain US military support to invade Manitoba to obtain control. The American military rejected his proposition.

He tried to create an international alliance between the Aboriginal and Metis peoples, but was not successful. In the end he worked to improve the living conditions and rights of the Métis people in the United States. Frustrated by his failures, Riel suffered further mental breakdowns and was hospitalized in Quebec.

From 1879, Riel returned to Montana to work on leading the Métis and Native peoples of the region to join forces and work against the provisional government. He did not succeed, but he decided to become an American citizen. He said, "The United States sheltered me, The English didn't care/what they owe they will pay/! I am citizen". From 1880 to 1884, Riel concentrated his public life on improving the situation of the Montana Metis. In the following years, he tried to gain official United States citizenship. Although he did, it did not protect him from being convicted of treason in Canada for earlier actions and being executed.

== Medicine Line (Canada–U.S. border) ==
The Métis homeland existed before the implementation of the Canada–U.S. border and continues to exist on both sides of this border today. The implementation of the border affected the Métis in a multitude of ways, with border enforcement growing from relaxed to increasingly stronger over time. In the late 18th century to early 19th century the Métis found that in times of conflict, they could cross the 49th parallel north in either direction and the trouble following them would stop and so the border was known as the Medicine Line. This began to change toward the end of the 19th century when the border became more enforced and the Canadian government saw an opportunity to put an end to the line hopping by using military force. This effectively split some of the Métis population and restricted the mobility of the People. The enforcement of the border was used as a means for governments on either side of the Medicine Line in the grand prairies to control the Métis population and to restrict their access to buffalo. Because of the importance of kinship and mobility for Métis communities, this had negative implications and resulted in different experiences and hardships for people in the now divided group.

Métis experience in the U.S. is largely coloured by unratified treaties and the lack of federal representation of Métis communities as a legitimate people, and this can be seen in the case of the Little Shell Tribe in Montana. While experiences in Canada are also affected by the misrecognition of the Métis, many Métis were dispossessed of their lands when they were sold to settlers and some communities set up road allowance villages. These small villages were squatters' villages along Crown land outside established villages in the prairies of Canada. These villages were often burned by local authorities and had to be rebuilt by surviving members of the communities who lived in them.

== See also ==
- List of Métis people
- Little Shell Band of Chippewa Indians
- Marriage à la façon du pays – Common law marriages between indigenous women and French fur traders in Canada
- Mestiço – Portuguese cognate for a person with one Indigenous and one European parent
- Mestizo – Spanish cognate for a person of mixed Indigenous American and European heritage in Latin America

== Bibliography ==
- Andersen, Chris (1 January 2011). "Moya 'Tipimsook ("The People Who Aren't Their Own Bosses"): Racialization and the Misrecognition of "Métis" In Upper Great Lakes Ethnohistory". Ethnohistory. 58 (1): 37–63. doi:10.1215/00141801-2010-063.
- Andersen, C. (2014). "More Than the Sum of Our Rebellions: Métis Histories Beyond Batoche". Ethnohistory, 61(4), 619–633. doi:10.1215/00141801-2717795
- Andersen, Chris (2014) "Metis": Race, Recognition and the Struggle for Indigenous Peoplehood. Vancouver: UBC Press.
- Bakker, Peter (1997). A Language of Our Own: The Genesis of Michif, the Mixed Cree-French Language of the Canadian Métis. Oxford studies in anthrological linguistics. New York & Oxford: Oxford University Press Inc. ISBN 0-19-509712-2. Paperback. Book preview link provided.
- Barkwell, L. (n.d.). Metis Political Organizations Archived 2019-09-04 at the Wayback Machine.
- Barkwell, Lawrence (2013) [2002). Métis Rights and Land Claims in Canada, An Annotated Bibliography.] Accessed September 1, 2019.
- Barkwell, Lawrence J. (2010). The Battle of Seven Oaks: a Métis perspective. Winnipeg, Manitoba: Louis Riel Institute. ISBN 978-0-9809912-9-1.
- Barkwell, Lawrence J. (2010). Women of the Métis Nation, Winnipeg: Louis Riel Institute. ISBN 978-0-9809912-5-3.
- Barkwell, Lawrence J. (2011). Veterans and Families of the 1885 Northwest Resistance. Saskatoon: Gabriel Dumont Institute. ISBN 978-1-926795-03-4
- Barkwell, Lawrence J.; Dorion, Leah; Préfontaine, Darren (2001). Métis Legacy: A Historiography and Annotated Bibliography. Winnipeg: Pemmican Publications Inc. & Saskatoon: Gabriel Dumont Institute. ISBN 1-894717-03-1.
- Barkwell, Lawrence J.; Dorion, Leah; Hourie, Audreen (2006). Métis Legacy II: Michif Culture, Heritage, and Folkways. Métis Legacy Series. Vol. 2. Saskatoon: Gabriel Dumont Institute. ISBN 0-920915-80-9.
- Barnholden, Michael. (2009). Circumstances Alter Photographs: Captain James Peters' Reports from the War of 1885. Vancouver, BC: Talonbooks. ISBN 978-0-88922-621-0.
- Bell, Gloria Jane (2013). "Oscillating Identities". In Adams, Christopher; Dahl, Gregg; Peach, Ian (eds.). Métis in Canada: history, identity, law and politics. The University of Alberta Press. ISBN 978-0-88864-722-1. "Most curators and scholars argue that the development of the Métis nation occurred at the Red River Settlement and that Métis families dispersed from there to other regions."
- Binnema, Theodore; Ens, Gerhard J.; Macleod, Rod (April 30, 2001). From Rupert's Land to Canada: Essays in Honour of John E. Foster. University of Alberta. ISBN 978-0-88864-363-6.
- Chartrand, Paul LAH (2002). "The Hard Case of Defining "The Métis People" and their Rights: A Comment on R. v. Powley". Constitutional Forum Constitutionnel. 12 (3). Centre for Constitutional Studies: 84–93. CanLIIDocs 376.
- Chartrand, Paul L.A.H.; Giokas, John (2002). "Defining 'the Métis People': The Hard Case of Canadian Aboriginal Law". In Chartrand, Paul L. A. H. (ed.). Who Are Canada's Aboriginal Peoples?: Recognition, Definition, and Jurisdiction. Saskatoon: Purich. pp. 268–294?.
- Dumont, Gabriel. Gabriel Dumont Speaks. Talonbooks, 2009. ISBN 978-0-88922-625-8.
- Friesen, Gerald (1987). The Canadian Prairies. Toronto: Toronto University Press. ISBN 0-8020-6648-8.
- Flanagan, T. (1990). "The History of Metis Aboriginal Rights: Politics, Principle, and Policy". Canadian Journal of Law and Society. 5: 71–94. doi:10.1017/S0829320100001721. S2CID 142986900.
- Foster, Martha Harroun (Summer 2006a). ""Just Following the Buffalo": Origins of a Montana Métis Community". Great Plains Quarterly. 97 (3). Lincoln, NE: Center for Great Plains Studies, University of Nebraska: 185–202. Archived from the original on 2022-05-09.
- Foster, Martha Harroun (2006b). We Know Who We Are: Métis Identity in a Montana Community. University of Oklahoma Press. ISBN 0-8061-3705-3.
- Gaudry, Adam (2013). "The Métis-ization of Canada: The Process of Claiming Louis Riel, Métissage, and the Métis People as Canada's Mythical Origin". Aboriginal Policy Studies. 2 (2): 64–87. Archived from the original on 2013-12-11.
- Gillespie, Greg (2007). Hunting for Empire Narrative of Sport in Rupert's Land, 1840–70. Vancouver, BC, Canada: UBC Press. ISBN 978-0-7748-1354-9.
- Giraud, Marcel (1984). Le Métis canadien / Marcel Giraud; introduction du professeur J.E. Foster avec Louise Zuk (in French). Saint-Boniface, Man.: Éditions du Blé. ISBN 0-920640-45-1.
- Hogue, Michel (Winter 2002). "Disputing the Medicine Line: The Plains Crees and the Canadian-American Border, 1876- 1885". Montana: The Magazine of Western History. 52 (4): 2–17. JSTOR 4520462.
- Hogue, Michel (2015). Métis and the Medicine Line: Creating a Border and Dividing a People. Reigina: University of Regina Press. ISBN 978-0-88977-380-6.
- Huel, Raymond Joseph Armand (1996), Proclaiming the Gospel to the Indians and the Métis, University of Alberta Press, ISBN 0-88864-267-9
- Jackson, John C. (2007). Children of the Fur Trade: Forgotten Métis of the Pacific Northwest. Corvallis: Oregon State Univ Press. ISBN 978-0-87071-194-7.
- James Alexander, Simone A. (2001). Mother Imagery in the Novels of Afro-Caribbean Women. University of Missouri Press. ISBN 0-8262-6316-X.
- Jones, Hilary (2013). The Métis of Senegal: Urban Life and Politics in French West Africa. Indiana University Press. ISBN 978-0-253-00705-6.
- LeBel, Sylvie (2003). "Le parcours identitaire des Métis du Canada: évolution, dynamisme et mythes". In Langlois, S.; Létourneau, J. (eds.). Aspects de la nouvelle francophonie canadienne. Québec: Presses de l'Université Laval. pp. 75–94. ISBN 2-7637-8083-0. Archived from the original on 2022-03-27.
- Lorcin, Patricia M. E. (2006). Algeria & France, 1800–2000: Identity, Memory, Nostalgia. Syracuse University Press. ISBN 0-8156-3074-3.
- MacKinnon, D. J. (2018). Metis pioneers: Marie Rose Delorme Smith and Isabella Clark Hardisty Lougheed (First ed.). Edmonton, Alberta: The University of Alberta Press..
- Madill, D. (July 1983). Select Annotaded Bibliography on Métis History and Claims (PDF). Treaties and Historical Research Centre, Research Branch, Corporate Policy. Ottawa: Indian and Northern Affairs Canada. Archived (PDF) from the original on 2022-02-19..
- McNab, David; Lischke, Ute (2005). Walking a Tightrope: Aboriginal People and their Representations. Wilfrid Laurier Univ. Press. ISBN 978-0-88920-460-7.
- McNab, David; Lischke, Ute (2007). The Long Journey of a Forgotten People: Métis Identities and Family Histories. Waterloo, Ont: Wilfrid Laurier University Press. ISBN 978-0-88920-523-9.
- Miller, James Rodger (2017). "From Riel to Métis". Reflections on Native-newcomer Relations: Selected Essays. University of Toronto Press. pp. 37–60.
- O'Toole, D. (2017). "Y a-t-il des communautés métisses au Québec? Une perspective juridique" (PDF). Nouveaux Cahiers du socialisme. 18: 29–36. Archived (PDF) from the original on 2022-04-19.
- Poitras Pratt, Yvonne (August 25, 2019). Digital Storytelling in Indigenous Education. A decolonizing journey for a Métis community (1st ed.). New York: Routledge Taylor & Francis Group. doi:10.4324/9781315265544. ISBN 978-1-315-26554-4. S2CID 199176897.
- Peterson, Jacqueline; Brown, Jennifer S.H., eds. (1985), The New Peoples: Being and Becoming Métis in North America, Critical Studies in Native History, Minnesota Historical Society Press, ISBN 0-87351-408-4
- Pritchard, James; Pritchard, James S.; Pritchard, Professor James (January 22, 2004). In Search of Empire: The French in the Americas, 1670-1730. Cambridge University Press. ISBN 978-0-521-82742-3.
- Ray, Arthur J. (2016). Aboriginal Rights Claims and the Making and Remaking of History. McGill-Queen's University Press. ISBN 978-0-7735-4743-8.
- Rea, J. E.; Scott, J. (2017) [2006]. "Manitoba Act". The Canadian Encyclopedia.
- Robson, Kathryn; Yee, Jennifer (2005). France and "Indochina": Cultural Representations. Lexington Books. ISBN 0-7391-0840-9.
- Quan, Holly (2009), Native Chiefs and Famous Métis: Leadership and Bravery in the Canadian West, Heritage House, ISBN 978-1-894974-74-5
- St-Onge, Nicole; Podruchny, Carolyn; Macdougall, Brenda, eds. (2012). Contours of a People: Metis family, mobility, and history. Norman, OK: University of Oklahoma Press. ISBN 978-0-8061-4279-1. Archived from the original on 2017-06-15.
- Sawchuck, J. (2001). Negotiating an Identity: Métis Political Organizations, the Canadian Government, and Competing Concepts of Aboriginality. American Indian Quarterly, 25(1), 73–92.
- Sprague, Douglas N (1988), Canada and the Métis, 1869–1885, Wilfrid Laurier University Press, ISBN 0-88920-958-8
- Teillet, Jean (2019). The North-West Is Our Mother: The Story of Louis Riel's People, Patrick Crean Editions. ISBN 978-1443450126
- Tremaudan, Auguste-Henri de (1936a). l'Histoire de la nation métisse dans l'ouest canadien (in French). Montreal: Éditions Albert Lévesque. pp. ?. Archived from the original on 24 September 2020.
- Tremaudan, Auguste-Henri de (1936b) [1982]. l'Histoire de la nation métisse dans l'ouest canadien [Hold High Your Heads: History of the Metis Nation in Western Canada]. Translated by Maguet, Elizabeth. Winnipeg: Pemmican Publications. p. ?.
- Van Kirk, Sylvia (1983). Many Tender Ties: Women in Fur-Trade Society, 1670–1870. University of Oklahoma Press. doi:10.2307/3346234. ISBN 978-0-8061-1847-5. JSTOR 3346234.
- Vrooman, N. (2019). There are a Range of Identities with Being Little Shell, Just As the Wider America Archived 2019-11-17 at the Wayback Machine. Distinctly Montana Magazine, pp 68–69 of 98.
- Wall, Denis (2008), The Alberta Métis letters, 1930–1940: policy review and annotations, DWRG Press, ISBN 978-0-9809026-2-4
- Weinstein, John (2007). Quiet Revolution West: The Rebirth of Métis Nationalism. Calgary: Fifth House Publishers. ISBN 978-1-897252-21-5.
