= Jeremy Laing =

Canadian fashion designer

- Born: 1979 (age 46–47); Peterborough, Ontario
- Occupation: Fashion designer
- Notable credit(s): ANDAM fashion award finalist, 2011
- Website: www.jeremylaing.com

Jeremy Laing is a Canadian fashion designer based in Toronto, Ontario who launched his eponymous brand in 2005. Beginning with a low-key show during New York Fashion Week, he has established a reputation for sharp tailoring, geometric construction and draping and layering techniques.

== Early life and career ==
Born in Peterborough, Ontario, Laing grew up on an army base in Germany. He developed his skills after watching his mother sew and began making clothes for friends and family as a young teenager, also learning how to create his own patterns. He won a scholarship to study fashion at Ryerson University, Toronto, also participating in the university's exchange programme and spending time at University of Westminster. London, before graduating in 2002. Laing worked for three years with Hudson's Bay Company. He subsequently worked as an assistant to Alexander McQueen, who he has described as being among his fashion mentors while he was growing up. After that, he freelanced for both McQueen and other fashion designers – he created showpiece items for five of McQueen's collections.

== Eponymous brand ==
Although Laing has said he originally envisaged working with an established fashion brand, he eventually decided to go solo, establishing a company with a schoolfriend and launching his first collection in 2005.

This first low key showing, described as a "petit debut", was at A/W2005 New York Fashion Week. A relative unknown outside Canada, he showed his collection away from the main show area and invited people along. He soon attracted coverage in media sources such as The New York Times and has now become a fixture at New York shows, as well as showing at Toronto Fashion Week. His studio remains in the Toronto neighbourhood of Parkdale, with some production at Scarborough. Speaking of his career path, he noted that many young designers attempt to reinvent themselves every season which he believes is a mistake, adding: "I want people to collect my pieces. I don’t make disposable fashion. It should last".

=== Brand hallmarks ===
Laing is known for his draping, sharp tailoring and boxy, often layered silhouettes. Signature pieces include T-shaped dresses and oversized trench coats. While his palette is generally muted, he includes showpiece artist-commissioned textiles, some sourced from Canadian designers. In 2011, he introduced menswear, plus a range of shoes produced in collaboration with LD Tuttle.
