= Alberta Métis Federation =

Umbrella group

The Alberta Métis Federation (AMF) is an umbrella group founded in February 2020 represented by six local Métis communities in Alberta that had separated from the Métis Nation of Alberta (MNA). The AMF is a decentralized body led by the presidents of its member organizations, called "Metis community associations". A seventh local community organization representing Edmonton was founded after the creation of the AMF.

The creation of the AMF occurred the same month that the Fort McKay Métis Community Association was recognized by the Government of Alberta as the rightful representative of that community's indigenous rights, over the objections of the MNA, which claims to speak for all Metis in Alberta.

The defection of the McKay community from the MNA was significant as community owns McKay Métis Group Ltd., an oil and gas sector supply company with CA$110,000,000 in gross revenue in 2020 and also has a land base, having purchased 492 acres (199 ha) of land from the Government of Alberta in 2018 for $1,600,000.

As of 2021, the member nations of the AMF are:

- Fort McKay Métis Community Association, Fort McKay
- Willow Lake Métis Nation, Anzac
- Edmonton Métis Community Association, Edmonton
- Athabasca Landing Métis Community Association, Athabasca
- Owl River Métis Community Association, Lac la Biche
- Lakeland Métis Community Association, Plamondon
- Chard Métis Community Association, Janvier

Since July 2021, the Alberta Métis Federation has been recognized by the Manitoba Metis Federation (MMF), which is in a dispute with the other provincial member of the Metis National Council.

In the fall of 2021 the MNA sued the Government of Canada to prevent it from signing an agreement with the MMF, is it claimed this would damage the Honour of the Crown because

The MMF has claimed that it now represents citizens of the Métis Nation within Alberta, and has supported the creation and development of a new Métis organization within Alberta known as the Alberta Métis Federation, to act as a satellite of the MMF and ultimately to displace the MNA

— Metis Nation of Alberta, legal filing
