= Malcolm Norris =

Canadian Métis leader (1900–1967)

Malcolm Norris (1900–1967) was an influential Canadian Métis leader of the twentieth century, and celebrated Aboriginal activist.

He was born to pioneer Edmonton businessman John Norris and his Metis wife Euphrosine Plante, in 1900 in Edmonton. Euphrosine was John's third wife, and she was younger than some of the children of his earlier pairings. So it was not a smoothly blended family. As well there was a degree of racial prejudice - the earlier children, themselves of a Metis mother, had not faced racism to the same degree in the years of the old North West as Malcolm and his siblings faced in the early 1900s. (

Norris served for a time with the Royal Canadian Mounted Police, and as an employee of the Hudson's Bay Company. During his on-the-job travels he developed his political views in response to the disorganization and poverty he saw in Métis and First Nations communities throughout northern Alberta and Saskatchewan. He became a Marxist Socialist and Métis nationalist. He was a founding member of the Métis Association of Alberta (now called the Métis Nation of Alberta), alongside his friend James P. Brady and others, in 1932.

In the Second World War he served in the Royal Canadian Air Force. Afterwards he settled in northern Saskatchewan. For many years he worked with and for the new Co-operative Commonwealth Federation government in Saskatchewan. During his time in Saskatchewan, Norris sought self-government and fiscal self-sufficiency for his people through organizing the Métis Association of Saskatchewan.

When the Saskatchewan Liberal Party returned to power in 1964, he was dismissed from his government job in Prince Albert. Following this he served as President of the Métis Association of Saskatchewan and advised First Nations Chiefs and bands on political organization.

In 1967 he moved back to Alberta, where he died from a stroke.

== See also ==
- Métis in Alberta
- Politics of Saskatchewan
