= Sarah Freeman (skier) =

Canadian alpine skier (born 1992)

- Born: Sarah Alexandra Freeman; April 29, 1992 (age 33); Calgary, Alberta
- Parent(s): Cass and Jamie Freeman

Sarah Freeman (born April 29, 1992) is a Canadian junior alpine skier, racing competitively since 2004. Throughout her childhood and early race years, she skied at Castle Mountain Resort.

Freeman has raced for the BC Ski Team since 2007. In 2011, she placed second in the ladies' downhill (first junior) in the GMC Canadian Championships at Nakiska. Her second best finish was 9th place in a downhill during the 2011 International Ski Federation Junior World Ski Championships at Crans-Montana. She has also competed in multiple FIS races, and in the Canadian Junior National Championships. She finished 1st in Giant Slalom at a 2010 FIS race at Mt Norquay. On May 19, 2011 Freeman was assigned to the Canadian women's development team for the 2011-2012 season.

She attended St. Michael's School in Pincher Creek, Alberta for 11 years before transferring to the National Sport School, a sports school in Calgary, Alberta. She is the youngest daughter of Cass and Jamie Freeman. She has two older sisters, Emma and Kyra.
