= Cassidy Caron =

Métis politician (born 1992)

President, Métis National Council
- In office 30 September 2021 – 30 September 2024
- Preceded by: Clément Chartier
- Succeeded by: Victoria Pruden

Chairperson of the Métis Youth British Columbia, Métis Nation British Columbia
- In office September 2016 – September 2020
- Succeeded by: Shaughn Davoren

Personal details
- Born: 14 July 1992 (age 33) Rossland, British Columbia
- Spouse: Paul Robitaille

Cassidy Caron (born 14 July 1992) is a Métis politician. She was elected as the president of the Métis National Council on 30 September 2021 to 30 September 2024. In 2025 she was succeeded as president by Victoria Pruden. As the chairperson of the Métis Youth British Columbia, she served as the Minister of Youth for the Métis Nation British Columbia from September 2016 to September 2020.

== Career ==
After graduating from university, Caron was accepted into the BC Public Service's Indigenous Youth Internship Program where she worked as a junior policy analyst with the Ministry of Environment. She completed the last three months of the internship working with Reciprocal Consulting (a community-based consulting firm that engaged in research and program evaluation of initiatives implemented in, by, and for Indigenous communities throughout Canada). After completing the internship, Caron was employed with Reciprocal Consulting for four years.

Caron began working as an independent research and evaluation consultant in October 2018. In this work, she engaged in community-based research, specifically focusing on the use of Indigenous research methodologies, community-based research with specific focus on the utilization of Indigenous research methodologies, community-based research, program evaluation, and workshop facilitation. Her work promoted effective collaboration and understanding between Indigenous and non-Indigenous organizations. The scope of Caron's consulting work included areas of Indigenous justice and crime prevention, women's safety and wellness, education, cultural safety, Indigenous health and health promotion, reconciliation, youth programming, mental health, addictions and wellness, economic development, food security, and Indigenous governance.

== Chairperson of the Métis Youth British Columbia ==
Caron was elected as the chairperson of the Métis Youth British Columbia and the Minister for Youth of the Métis Nation British Columbia in September 2016. In this role, she provided testimony to the Standing Committee on Indigenous and Northern Affairs Canada for their study on suicide among Indigenous peoples and communities in 2016, oversaw the first ever mock Governance Assembly with Métis Youth leaders from across Métis Nation British Columbia in 2018, and attended the Summit of the Americas as well as the Indigenous Leaders Summit of the Americas in 2018.

== Presidency of Métis National Council ==
On 30 September 2021, Caron was elected as the president of the Métis National Council. Though she is not the first woman to lead the Métis National Council (Métis Nation of Alberta President Audrey Poitras served as the interim national president from 2003 to 2004), she is the first woman elected to serve as in the role. She replaced Clément Chartier who had served as the national president for 18 years but did not run again when an election was forced by court order, following disputes with four of the five governing members of the Métis National Council.

On 23 May 2024, Caron announced that she would not be seeking re-election at the end of her term.

=== Dispute with former governing member ===
On 28 September 2021, the eve of the 2021 special sitting of the General Assembly of the Métis National Council, Manitoba Métis Federation President David Chartrand announced that the Manitoba Métis Federation would be withdrawing their membership with the Métis National Council effective the start of the Special Sitting. This was following a protracted power struggle for control of the Métis National Council, in which Chartrand had supported outgoing Métis National Council President Clément Chartier in suspending Métis Nation of Ontario over concerns about their citizenship registry processes and supported Chartier's decision to not hold meetings of the Métis National Council Board of Governors and General Assembly for fear that Métis Nation of Alberta, Métis Nation—Saskatchewan, and Métis Nation of Ontario would gain control over the Métis National Council by voting as a bloc. The meeting of the Métis National Council General Assembly was held following a decision by the Ontario Superior Court of Justice that the resolution that put Métis Nation of Ontario on probation did not suspend Métis Nation Ontario, and ordered that all members of the Métis National Council Board of Governors propose a Special Sitting of the General Assembly where the election of a new Métis National Council President would occur.

Caron was elected as president by the General Assembly of the Métis National Council on 30 September 2021. Following her election Caron said of Manitoba Métis Federation:

My position throughout this is that the Manitoba Metis Federation, they will always have a seat at the table should they wish to come back. I am open to respectful conversation and dialogue with the Manitoba Metis Federation and I'm just looking to move forward and continue to be the voice and the one who advocates on behalf of the four Métis governments who still belong to the Métis National Council.

On 27 January 2022, Métis National Council filled a statement of claim with the Ontario Superior Court of Justice. In the claim, Métis National Council asked the court to approve damages of $15 million against former Métis National Council President and CEO Clement Chartier, former Métis National Council Acting President David Chartrand, the Manitoba Métis Federation, and former MNC executive director Wenda Watteyne. In addition, Métis National Council asked the court to freeze the defendants' funds and investment accounts on an interim basis, approve $1 million in damages, and other forms of restitution. In the statement of claim, the Métis National Council alleged that the defendants of engaging in a scorched earth policy to intentionally cause financial harm and other injury to Métis National Council in order to compete with the Métis National Council in attempting to assert that Manitoba Métis Federation is the authority and voice of the Métis Nation following their departure from Métis National Council.

On 5 May 2022, Manitoba Métis Federation President David Chartrand and Manitoba Métis Federation issued a statement of defence. In the statement, the defendants allege that the allegations are part of a broader political dispute over who represents Métis people.

As of 22 July 2022, none of the allegations have been proven in court.

=== Reconciliation and residential schools ===
==== Vatican delegation ====
In March 2022, Caron went as president of the Métis National Council, with a delegation of Métis residential school survivors, leaders, and community members to the Vatican to meet with Pope Francis. There were Métis representing Métis Nation of Ontario, Métis Nation—Saskatchewan, Métis Nation of Alberta, and Métis Nation British Columbia as part of the delegation. The Métis delegation was in partnership with First Nations and Inuit delegations that were visiting the Vatican simultaneously. The Métis delegation had a general audience with the Pope.

The Pope had invited the delegations within the context of reconciliation. Caron delivered a message to Pope Francis on behalf of the Métis National Council that extended an invitation to him and outlined a pathway for truth, healing, reconciliation, and justice. At the end of the delegation's visit, Pope Francis issued an apology for the conduct of the members of the Catholic Church in the residential school system who abused Indigenous children. Pope Francis agreed to visit Canada and to continue the journey of reconciliation.

==== Royal audience ====
Caron indicated that she intended to make a request to Prince Charles and Camilla, Duchess of Cornwall for Queen Elizabeth to apologize to residential school survivors as the leader of the Anglican Church and Canada's head of state. The Prince of Wales and the Duchess of Cornwall were visiting Canada on a tour that partially focused on reconciliation with Indigenous people.

== Personal life ==
=== Education ===
Caron received a Bachelor of Arts with a major in First Nations Studies and a minor in history from Vancouver Island University in 2014 and a master's degree in community development from the University of Victoria in 2022. She graduated from Rossland Secondary School in 2010.

=== Family ===
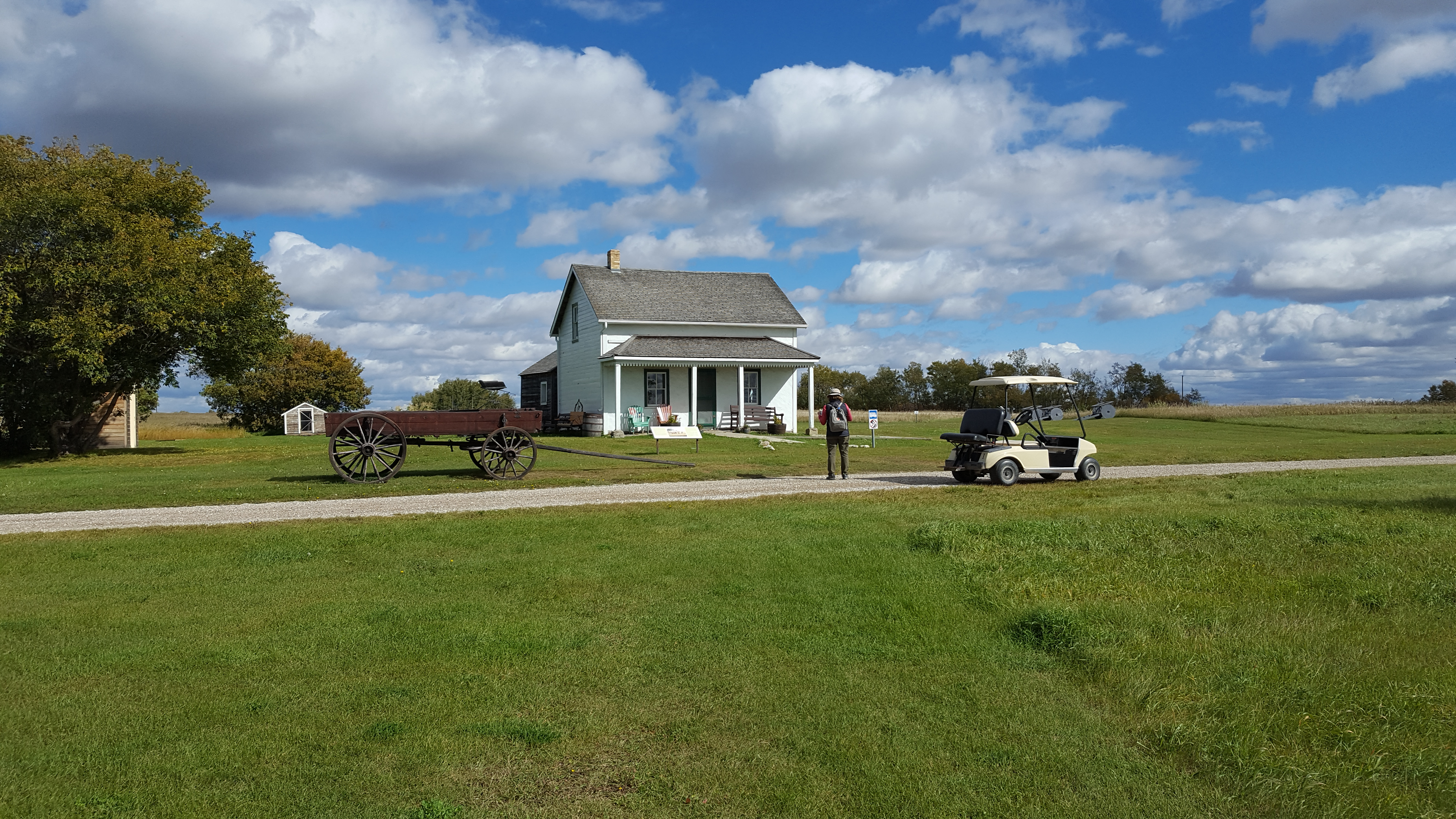
Former house of Jean Caron Sr. located at the Batoche National Historic Site

Caron's family comes from historic Métis Southbranch Settlement communities of Batoche and St. Louis in Saskatchewan. Caron's grandmother, Marie Odile Boucher, belonged to one of the first five Métis families to settle at St. Louis. Caron's grandfather, Jean-Baptist Caron, was born at Batoche, where his parents, Jean Caron Sr. and Marguerite Dumas, had a house that was destroyed during the Battle of Batoche. The house was rebuilt between 1891 and 1895 and now stands as a feature at the Batoche National Historic Site.

Caron was raised in BC by her mother, Anna Caron. She has a sister, Tessa. Caron lives with her husband, Paul Robitaille, in Ontario, and they are expecting their first child.
