= Glen McCallum =

Métis politician (born 1955)

Glen Hector McCallum

President, Métis Nation—Saskatchewan
- Incumbent
- Assumed office 29 May 2021
- Vice President: Michelle LeClair
- In office 27 May 2017 – 29 May 2021
- Vice President: Gerald Morin
- Preceded by: Robert Doucette

Area Director for Northern Region III of the Métis Nation—Saskatchewan
- In office 8 September 2012 – 27 May 2017
- Preceded by: Louis J. Gardiner
- Succeeded by: Mervin Tex Bouvier

Personal details
- Born: 4 August 1955
- Spouse: Verna McCallum
- Relations: Leonard McCallum, brother

Glen McCallum is a Métis politician. He was first elected to serve as President of Métis Nation—Saskatchewan on 27 May 2017 and was re-elected on 29 May 2021. He is from Pinehouse, Saskatchewan.

McCallum served as the area director for Northern Region III from 2012 to 2017. In 2017, McCallum was elected to be President of the Métis Nation—Saskatchewan. During his term as president, McCallum has advanced Métis rights and signed agreements with the Government of Canada, the Government of Saskatchewan, and various municipal governments in Saskatchewan. He has also worked with other Indigenous governments in Saskatchewan to provide programs and supports for the COVID-19 pandemic. He was successful in having government funding restored to the Métis Nation—Saskatchewan after the funding had been pulled in October 2014.

Prior to entering Métis politics, McCallum worked as a counsellor providing addictions and recovery programs in Saskatoon, SK and his home community of Pinehouse.

== Professional work ==
=== Recovery Lake ===
McCallum helped his brother, Leonard, to establish the addictions program at Recovery Lake in 1987, which is located at Muskwa Lake, 20 km west of Pinehouse. The programs at Recovery Lake were grounded in identity, culture, values, and languages, as is based on eight principles:

- Trust
- Respect
- Feeling
- Caring
- Tolerance
- Understanding
- Acceptance
- Forgiveness

=== Building a Nation ===
In 1998, McCallum, working with Dr. Tom Hengen from the University of Saskatchewan, founded Building A Nation Family Healing Centre, Inc. in 1998, and McCallum served as president of Building A Nation and worked as a counsellor associate for 12 years. Building a Nation was a culturally sensitive and competent mental health program located in Saskatoon's west side core neighbourhood. The programs offered at Building a Nation incorporated the Medicine Wheel as a teaching tool, and provided a blend of traditional and western-based support services to the clients. The services provided were in stark contrast to many of the services provided at the time because they recognized the falsehoods of the "Indian problem" narrative and the negative impacts of cultural genocide on Indigenous people though residential schools and attempts at forced assimilation. The services provided included clinical and traditional counselling services, crisis services, personal development programs, as well as assistance programs with child custody, justice system, and social assistance in support of individuals and specific interest groups. Much of the programming was developed to use the Medicine Wheel as a teaching and assessment tool.

In 1999, Building a Nation established a 10-week youth-oriented theatre production program called Circle of Voices that went on to become the Gordon Tootoosis Nīkānīwin Theatre (formerly known as the Saskatchewan Native Theatre Company). This program was designed to help youth to develop their theatrical talent through story telling, providing healing through art and giving them an opportunity to tell about their struggles towards a healthy lifestyle.

Building a Nation also established the Building A Nation Training Institute, Inc. as a registered private vocational school that provided a counselling training program called Medicine Wheel Counselling and Case Management.

The clientele served by Building a Nation were 90% Indigenous, and there were an estimated 1,000 active client files every year, with an even higher number of people being served thought nuclear and extended family members connected to the individual files.

Build our Nation, Canada, as a community of citizens living in the spirit of a "cultural mosaic" in harmony together. Our logo portrays this. Our company’s structure, comprised of First Nations, Métis, and mainstream people demonstrates this. It is our purpose to honour real differences as gifts of diversity and to achieve harmony and integrity by commitment to common goals.

— Building a Nation mission statement, 1998

=== Northern Village of Pinehouse ===
McCallum served as the Director of Social Development for Pinehouse.

== Presidency of Métis Nation—Saskatchewan ==
The governance of the Métis Nation—Saskatchewan has been an ongoing concern that Glen McCallum worked to address, with a goal of ensuring that there is good governance and a strong government.

Leading up to the 2017 general election, "Métis [were] battling Métis, each in the name and for the purported good of Métis Nation – Saskatchewan," with "their genesis in political struggles to control [Métis Nation—Saskatchewan]," "factions each [claiming] the [Métis Nation—Saskatchewan] Constitution and the path of righteousness are on their side," and "[polite] words [were used to] mask less cooperative sentiments." The Hon. Mr. Justice B. Scherman, presiding over a case in 2015, noted that:

"The [Métis Nation—Saskatchewan] Constitution contemplates, indeed dictates, that the affairs of [Métis Nation—Saskatchewan] are to be governed by democratic processes. The reality is that the Constitution and its democratic processes and ideals have been ignored and subverted for years. Now, when it appears too late to save [Métis Nation—Saskatchewan], the parties ask the Court to intervene and provide a judicial solution. It has become increasingly apparent that seeking judicial remedies is simply part of each faction’s strategic arsenal and that whatever remedy the Court provides or refuses to provide will not address the fundamental problems."

— The Hon. Mr. Justice B. Scherman, Doucette v Morin, 2015 SKQB 259

McCallum, recognizing that "A president has to work with his government in order for things to move smoothly forward and have a listening ear in planning together in regards to where we go," ran on a platform in 2017 of building good governance, effective administration, and a strong government. Following his election, in his State of the Nation address at the 2018 session of the Métis Nation Legislative Assembly, McCallum said that:

"We have our ups and downs, but today, as we sit around here, we have to begin that process of tightening up our governance to be able to put rules in place so that we don't fall back to the old ways. I was tired for four-and-a-half years, coming to meetings, and the infighting that were happening, but I tell you one thing, our Constitution held strong. In every court case that we've ever gone to, we've won based on the right for our Métis to be governed in the right way—in the proper way—and that's what we practice today."

— President Glen McCallum, 2018 MNLA in Saskatoon

=== Restoring federal funding and establishing government offices ===
The Métis Nation—Saskatchewan had lost federal funding on 1 November 2014 due to a lack of Provincial Métis Council meetings and the inability to hold a properly and duly called session of the Métis Nation Legislative Assembly. The funding, provided through a Basic Organizational Capacity agreement, was halted until the 2017 general election.

The federal funding was reinstated a few days after the general election, which followed a Métis Nation Legislative Assembly and General Assembly earlier in 2017.

During the period where the Métis Nation—Saskatchewan was without funding, offices were closed, assets had been sold to help cover expenses, and the finances were put under third-party management. A transition team was brought in that included Richard Quintal, a federal official seconded to the Métis Nation—Saskatchewan, and former Saskatchewan MLA and Minister of Health Louise Simard, among others, both of whom remained at Métis Nation—Saskatchewan after the transition period was over to help build strong and accountable governance in the Métis Nation—Saskatchewan government.

=== Advancing Métis self-government ===
In his role as president, Glen McCallum has worked to advance the rights of Métis, including self-government. During his term as the Area Director for Northern Region III of Métis Nation—Saskatchewan, McCallum was a signatory to the Canada-Metis Nation Accord. Following his election as president, McCallum was a signatory to the Memorandum of Understanding on Advancing Reconciliation, the Framework Agreement for Advancing Reconciliation, and the Métis Government Recognition and Self-Government Agreement. These agreements establish the process by which the Government of Canada and the Métis Nation negotiate on a nation-to-nation, government-to-government basis on matters such as recognition of Métis rights, addressing unresolved claims and grievances, access resources for programs and service delivery, and advance recognition of self-government.

Following the signing of the Métis Government Recognition and Self-Government Agreement, McCallum said:

"Today is a day to celebrate the legacy of our Métis ancestors and the future of our children. For over a century, our people have fought – figuratively and literally – for recognition, respect and a rightful place in Canadian society. This agreement acknowledges the right of our people to self-government and to a true nation-to-nation relationship. We are able to stand taller today because we stand on the shoulders of giants and on the cusp of a better future."

— President Glen McCallum

=== Land claims ===
The matter of Métis title is an ongoing matter. On 1 March 1994, the Métis Nation of Saskatchewan filled a major land claim in the Court of Queen's Bench in Saskatoon. This land claim covered 145,000 km^{2}, and claimed ownership and jurisdiction over the lands and resources in that area, as well as compensation for being deprived of the land and resources and the destruction of the environment in the land claim area. The land claim was filed as a test case for Saskatchewan, with the goal of further land claims across Saskatchewan. In the Framework Agreement for Advancing Reconciliation, the 1994 Land Claim is explicitly stated as a priority in the negotiations between Métis Nation—Saskatchewan and the Government of Canada in the preamble.

To help move matters such as the North West Métis Land Claim forward, Métis Nation—Saskatchewan retained lawyer Thomas Isaac. Isaac, who is the Ministerial Special Representative on Métis s. 35 Rights to Minister of Indigenous and Northern Affairs Carolyn Bennett, has extensive experience in Aboriginal law in Canada, including advising the Northwest Territories and the Government of Canada on negotiations for the South Slave region, serving as an assistant deputy minister in Northwest Territories during the establishment of Nunavut, and being part of other treaty and land settlement negotiations across Canada.

In February 2020, McCallum announced that Métis Nation—Saskatchewan would be contributing $750,000 to advance mapping processes that are pertinent in discussions with the Government of Canada to address outstanding Métis land claims in Saskatchewan. In his announcement, McCallum stated:

"This is about Métis people throughout Saskatchewan to address and reconcile lands inherently belonging to our Métis citizens under our Section 35 rights. This investment will kick-start the research process that will provide evidence of historic Métis land use that we need to be able to seriously negotiate a settlement with Canada."

— President Glen McCallum

==== Competing Northwest Saskatchewan land claim ====
On 16 October 2019, Métis National Council President, Clément Chartier, in collaboration with former Métis Nation—Saskatchewan President Jim Durocher and several others, filed a competing Métis land claim in Saskatoon, SK that covered a large area of Northwest Saskatchewan and Northeast Alberta, including most if not all of the 1994 North West Saskatchewan Land Claim. This land claim was not filed through the Métis Nation—Saskatchewan and Métis Nation of Alberta, despite both being governing members of the Métis National Council and the recognized governing bodies of the Métis in their respective provinces.

Subsequently, the Métis Nation—Saskatchewan filed a complaint with the Law Society of Saskatchewan and asked the court to strike the competing land claim. Chartier had previously represented Métis Nation—Saskatchewan on the 1994 land claim, and the Métis Nation—Saskatchewan argued that these actions by Chartier were a direct conflict of interest by acting against their interests as his former client in violation of s.3.4-10 of the Law Society of Saskatchewan Code of Professional Conduct. President McCallum argued that "Any other person that wants to pursue another way of doing things totally, in my view, undermines our government [the Métis Nation—Saskatchewan]. If I did that with a provincial government or federal government, then I would be dealt with in a way to wake me up in regards to the rules and the laws of this country." Chartier recognized that the complaint with the law society against him might be successful. As of 28 April 2021, the matter has not been resolved.

=== Tri-Council ===
On 27 June 2019, Métis Nation—Saskatchewan, Métis Nation of Alberta, and Métis Nation of Ontario signed Métis Government Recognition and Self-Government Agreements with The Crown that recognized the Métis inherent right of self-government and established a process by which self-government would be established.

As the three Métis governments began working towards the requirements of the Agreements, they established an informal structure of intergovernmental meetings of the three governments to advance their collective efforts on implementing the Métis Government Recognition and Self-Government Agreements. This helped the three governments to cooperate on shared issues outside of the dysfunctional structure that had developed in the Métis National Council.

=== Partnership with Canadian Geographic for Future of Michif program ===
Métis Nation-Saskatchewan and Canadian Geographic magazine signed an agreement to launch The Future of Michif Program, which is a $1.8 million multi-platform engagement program, and work together on preserving the Michif language. While Michif is the most widely spoken Métis language, it is endangered and at risk of going extinct as other Métis languages, including Bungi and Brayet, have already gone extinct. The Future of Michif Program approached the objectives of the program in two main ways: highlighting and celebrating Métis culture and the Michif language through media, and to build capacity to educate and inspire future generations of Métis about Métis culture, heritage, and language, especially Michif.

=== Batoche National Historic Site ===
Batoche is a site of historic and cultural significance to Métis. One of the communities of the Southbranch Settlement, Batoche was the site of the capital of the Provisional Government of Saskatchewan and the Exovedate governing council as part of the North-West Resistance, culminating in the Battle of Batoche on 9–12 May 1885.

On 18 December 2020, Métis Nation-Saskatchewan and Parks Canada signed an agreement to open a sub-table under the Framework Agreement for Advancing Reconciliation to discuss and explore the full range of options about the future management of the Batoche National Historic Site.

=== Constitutional reform ===
At the April 2019 Métis Nation Legislative Assembly, a motion was passed mandating that a process of constitutional reform for the Constitution of the Métis Nation—Saskatchewan. This process involved broad consultations across Saskatchewan, including consultation with Métis citizens, Métis Nation Legislative Assembly members, and subject-matter experts, with the goal of updating the Constitution to better reflect the changes in Métis Nation—Saskatchewan governance and building a stronger government based on Métis values, traditions, and culture.

==== Judicial Tribunal of the Métis Nation—Saskatchewan ====
As a part of the constitutional reform process, the process of establishing a judicial tribunal was undertaken. At the 2018 General Assembly following the Métis Nation Legislative Assembly, a motion was passed to start the process of establishing a judicial tribunal for Métis Nation—Saskatchewan. In the original governance structure, the Senate of Métis Nation—Saskatchewan served as the judicial arm of the government, but the judicial role of the Senate was removed in 2008. Following the motion, a process of consultations on establishing a judicial tribunal was undertaken, and a report was presented to the Métis Nation Legislative Assembly.

=== Registry ===
Structuring the Central Registry of Métis Nation—Saskatchewan has presented challenges. As presented in her 2001 report, Marilyn Poitras highlighted the past difficulties of ensuring Métis citizens were accurately verified, recorded, and enumerated. The Senate of Métis Nation—Saskatchewan was originally responsible for overseeing the operations of the Central Registry, but the oversight of the Central Registry was transferred to the Provincial Métis Council in 2008.

Following transfer of oversight of the Central Registry to the Provincial Métis Council, the oversight was assigned to a minister for the Central Registry. In 2020, there was a cabinet shuffle that eliminated the Minister of the Central Registry, and at the 2021 Métis Nation Legislative Assembly, the Métis Nation—Saskatchewan Citizenship Act was amended to separate the Central Registry from the political structure of Métis Nation—Saskatchewan.

When federal funding was restored to Métis Nation—Saskatchewan, the Central Registry re-opened and an office was established. At the time that the Central Registry re-opened in September 2017, a total of 4,430 card numbers had been issued to citizens. As of 26 January 2021, the Central Registry had 11,628 registered eligible citizens, from a total of 17,112 applications in-progress (3,640), completed (13.528), or denied (1,153).

=== Election reform ===
In 2018, the Métis Nation Legislative Assembly amended the Saskatchewan Métis Elections Act 2007 to provide the option of, when a vacancy develops in the Executive or Provincial Métis Council, calling a by-election or suspending the need for a by-election and allowing election of a person in accordance with the Constitution of the Métis Nation—Saskatchewan as an interim to remain in that office until the following election.

At the 2019 Métis Nation Legislative Assembly, a series of resolutions were passed that clarified eligibility to vote and to seek nomination for office in an election. These resolutions required that anyone wishing to vote in any Métis Nation—Saskatchewan election or wanting to seek nomination for office must be a verified citizen of Métis Nation—Saskatchewan or be in the process of obtaining their citizenship.

The Saskatchewan Métis Elections Act 2007 was further amended in February 2021 by the Métis Nation Legislative Assembly to incorporate the resolutions from November 2019 and to make additional necessary changes to better align with best legislative practices and ensure that a more fair and transparent election would be held.

=== Housing supports ===
Métis Nation—Saskatchewan established housing financial support programs. These programs included the Métis Nation-Saskatchewan First-Time Home Buyers Program and the Métis Nation-Saskatchewan Emergency Repair Program.

On 23 April 2021, Central Urban Métis Federation Inc. (CUMFI) Métis Local 165 held a sod-turning ceremony to start construction on the Round Prairie Elders’ Lodge. Métis Nation—Saskatchewan provided $1.5 million in funding through Western Region IIa Regional Council and the Ministry of Housing as part of the Regional Housing Strategy and the Canada-Métis Nation Housing Sub-Accord.

=== COVID-19 response ===
On 18 March 2020, the province of Saskatchewan declared a state of emergency in response to the COVID-19 pandemic, and began implementing increasingly strict public health orders over the following weeks. On 18 April 2020, recognizing the unique challenges faced by Métis people in urban, rural, and remote communities, Métis Nation—Saskatchewan declared its own state of emergency to urge for more action and increased collaboration between all levels of government. This was especially important for remote northern communities due to the unique challenges that they face with reduced access to health resources and community supports.

Métis Nation—Saskatchewan was providing supports to Métis citizens throughout the pandemic. Supports that were made available included food hampers, accommodations for mandatory self-isolation, travel expense reimbursement for needed in-hospital care, rent and technology expense supports for post-secondary students, financial supports for rental, mortgage, and/or utility payments, financial supports for emergency childcare, as well as mental health and addictions supports to help with the stress that citizens were facing during the pandemic.

Early in the pandemic, McCallum began reaching out to other governments, both Indigenous and Crown governments, to set up partnerships to better serve the needs of the people of Saskatchewan. Efforts included partnering with the Meadow Lake Tribal Council and the Government of Canada to provide $2.3 million to support efforts in northwestern Saskatchewan as part of the North West Saskatchewan Pandemic Response Plan, partnering with Meadow Lake Tribal Council to provide a wide range of supports in health services, and Métis Nation—Saskatchewan, the Meadow Lake Tribal Council, and the Federation of Sovereign Indigenous Nations to raise concerns about security checkpoints established by the Government of Saskatchewan and how they are negatively impacting Indigenous people in Northern Saskatchewan due to the unique situations that exists for these communities.

Once COVID-19 vaccines were more widely available, Métis Nation—Saskatchewan launched the Vaccinated Métis Strong campaign. In partnership with the Saskatchewan Health Authority, Métis Nation—Saskatchewan held a special two-day pop-up COVID-19 vaccination clinic at the Métis Nation—Saskatchewan administrative office building in Saskatoon to provide a culturally-safe vaccination site.

In his mandate letter to Métis Nation—Saskatchewan Minister of Health, Marg Friesen, President McCallum commended Friesen on her leadership and commitment that were critical to the success of the Métis Nation—Saskatchewan response to the COVID-19 pandemic and helping support Métis citizens.

=== Duty to Consult ===
On 9 September 2020, Métis Nation—Saskatchewan filled a claim against NexGen Energy Ltd. The claim argued that NexGen was in breach of its obligations under the Study Agreement the two parties had signed, including the obligation to negotiate an Impact benefit Agreement, and to ask the court to prevent NexGen from filing regulatory filings for the establishment of a uranium mine in Northern Region II.

Shortly after filing the claim against NexGen Energy Ltd., Métis Nation—Saskatchewan sued the Government of Saskatchewan, claiming that the province in failing in its obligations to properly consult with Métis with respect to harvesting, land use, and commercial activities, and that the 2010 First Nation and Métis Consultation Policy Framework does not recognize assertions that Métis title to land and resources continue to exist and fails to uphold the Honour of the Crown. Métis Nation—Saskatchewan asked the court to declare that the 2010 policy is invalid and reliance on the policy allows the province to avoid its duty to consult and accommodate.

=== Memoranda of Understanding ===
During his term as president, McCallum signed several memoranda of understanding to advance various matters of interest to Métis citizens.

==== Métis harvesting rights ====
On 18 December 2019, Métis Nation—Saskatchewan and the Government of Saskatchewan recommitted to a memorandum of understanding that had been signed 10 November 2010. This memorandum of understanding was to negotiate recognition of Métis harvesting rights in Saskatchewan. The 2010 memorandum of understanding had been suspended in 2012 due to lack of capacity in the Métis Nation—Saskatchewan, but governance capacity had been rebuilt to allow the negotiations to continue.

==== University of Saskatchewan ====
Recognizing the inherent right and importance of education for Métis people, on 18 November 2019 the University of Saskatchewan and Métis Nation—Saskatchewan signed a memorandum of understanding to advance strategies for improving access and completion for Métis to post-secondary education and increasing the Métis presence on campus.

==== Health and cancer strategies ====
Métis Nation—Saskatchewan signed memoranda of understanding with the Saskatchewan Cancer Agency and researchers in the University of Saskatchewan Department of Community Health and Epidemiology. The purpose of these memoranda were to better understand and support Métis people who are affected by cancer.

==== Saskatchewan Health Authority ====
At the 2018 Back to Batoche festival, the Saskatchewan Health Authority and Métis Nation—Saskatchewan signed a memorandum of understanding. The memorandum established a framework for the two parties to work together to promote good health and to improve wellness outcomes for Métis people.

==== Saskatchewan School Boards Association ====
In the spirit of advancing reconciliation and ensuring inclusion of Métis content in curriculum, as well as increasing success for Métis youth, the Saskatchewan School Board Association and Métis Nation—Saskatchewan signed a memorandum of understanding to commit to working together to ensure that Métis are fully able to participate in all aspects of the education system and enhance student success.

==== Royal Canadian Mounted Police, Saskatchewan "F" Division ====
The Royal Canadian Mounted Police and Métis Nation—Saskatchewan agreed to a protocol with the goal of resolving disputes in Métis communities, prevent incidents and the escalation of violence, and improve access to culturally appropriate training for police members.

==== Île-à-la-Crosse Boarding School ====
Métis and First Nations youth were sent to the Île-à-la-Crosse Boarding school, a part of the Canadian Indian residential school system, which left a legacy that has affected Métis citizens for generations. A memorandum of understanding was signed between the Île-à-la-Crosse Boarding School Steering Committee, Métis Nation—Saskatchewan, and The Crown to start exploratory discussions towards establishing a formal dialogue to address the legacy of the Boarding School for Métis people.

==== National parks and historic sites ====
Métis Nation—Saskatchewan and Parks Canada reached an agreement to provide free access starting 17 July 2020 to Métis Nation—Saskatchewan citizens for all Parks Canada administered locations in Saskatchewan, and the agreement will remain in effect until 31 March 20206 when it will be up for review and renewal. Métis Nation—Saskatchewan citizens will have free access to Grasslands National Park and Prince Albert National Park, as well as the National Historic Sites of Batoche, Fort Battleford, and Motherwell Homestead.

== Controversies ==
=== Resignation of the Métis Nation—Saskatchewan Treasurer ===
On 12 September 2017, the Treasurer of Métis Nation—Saskatchewan, Mary Ann Morin, submitted a motion via email to the other members of Executive of Métis Nation—Saskatchewan Treasurer to offer her resignation and sent communication to all Provincial Council Members later that same day stating that she had submitted her resignation, both post-dated to a Provincial Métis Council meeting to take place on 24–26 September 2017.

The Executive of Métis Nation—Saskatchewan accepted the email as her resignation the following day after receiving a legal opinion that it constituted her resignation. Morin attempted to withdraw the motion through a series of emails sent between 12 and 23 September 2017, including an email to the other Executive members on 15 September 2017 stating that she would like to withdraw her resignation if possible but would understand if it were not possible to do so. At the 23 September 2017 Provincial Métis Council meeting, the Council acknowledged that Morin's email constituted her resignation and accepted that McCallum had accepted her resignation.

During the 2018 Métis Nation Legislative Assembly, the Assembly was provided with a legal opinion by a lawyer present that each of the two communications did constitute Morin's resignation. The Assembly accepted the legal opinion and voted to appoint an Interim Treasurer from the Provincial Métis Council, Earl Cook, in accordance with the Constitution of the Métis Nation—Saskatchewan and Saskatchewan Métis Elections Act 2007.

The matter was not brought before the court to resolve the matter until 20 December 2019. Morin argued that she had sent the emails as a threat in hopes that it would draw attention and that the Provincial Métis Council would recognize the seriousness of her frustrations. The decision from the Court of Queen's Bench for Saskatchewan was that Morin had not unequivocally resigned and continues to be the Treasurer, but was unable to find evidence that the Provincial Métis Council had acted in bad faith. An appeal was filled by Métis Nation—Saskatchewan on 27 March 2020. As of 28 April 2021, the appeal has not been heard.

=== Dispute with Métis National Council leadership ===
==== Métis Nation 2020 plan ====
On 28–29 June 2017, McCallum and Métis Nation—Saskatchewan Vice President Gerald Morin attended a meeting of the Métis National Council Priority and Planning Committee in Montreal, QC as guests. At the meeting, Métis National Council President Clément Chartier presented his Métis Nation 2020 plan:

A phased plan for re-establishing the Métis Nation government in the historic Red River Settlement, now the City of Winnipeg, will be implements, including:

1. Leading up to 2020 (November 2018) declaring the third provisional government;
2. On May 12, 2020 in the National Assembly declaring the government of the Métis Nation;
3. Finalizing the relocation of the Métis Nation government headquarters, which initiative shall be phased-in beginning immediately;
4. The establishment of a permanent National Assembly;
5. The housing of the National Registry office; and
6. The opening of a Métis Nation Relations Office in Ottawa

— Métis Nation Priority and Planning Meeting agenda, 28–29 June 2017, Montreal, QC

==== Métis Nation of Ontario ====
At the November 2018 Métis National Council General Assembly, Chartier presented a report to the Assembly. In this report, he asserted the following:

1. From the beginning of its members in MNC, the MNO has failed to apply historic Métis Nation membership/citizenship criteria.
2. The MNO has consistently ignored and been in breach of MNC General Assembly resolutions on citizenship and grandfathering.
3. The MNO has attempted to extend the boundaries of the historic Métis Nation homeland without the consent of MNC and its other Governing Members.

Métis Nation of Ontario President Margaret Froh challenged the conclusions presented by Chartier in the report, noting that Métis Nation of Ontario had not been consulted in the preparation of the report, had not received any inquiries during the preparation of the report, and was not provided with sufficient time to prepare a response to the report before it was tabled.

After the report was presented, the General Assembly adopted the following resolution to put Métis Nation of Ontario on probation:

BE IT THEREFORE RESOLVED that the members of the MNC General Assembly exercise their inherent authority and place the MNO on probation for one year while it meets the conditions listed below failing which the General Assembly will revisit this matter at the conclusion of the probation period and decide on further action.

Métis Nation of Ontario had initiated a review process of all of the citizenship files held by their registry as well as their registry's compliance with CSA Z710 standard on Métis registry operations in October 2017. However, they were unwilling to allow the Métis National Council to conduct the audit due to concerns about political interference and whether the review would be independent and objective, and instead chose an independent third party to operate their registry and conduct the audit.

On 22 January 2020, the leadership of the Métis National Council unilaterally made the decision to suspend Métis Nation of Ontario without a resolution from the General Assembly authorizing the action. Chartier justified this decision because in the resolution the General Assembly had agreed with the suspension but had chosen probation. McCallum challenged this assertion, stating that the resolution was to allow Métis Nation of Ontario to present its full information to the General Assembly, and lamented that there were no Métis National Council meetings being scheduled that would allow this to happen.

==== Tri-Council meetings ====
On 27 June 2019, the presidents of Métis Nation of Alberta, Métis Nation—Saskatchewan, and Métis Nation of Ontario signed the Métis Government Recognition and Self-Government Agreement with The Crown. Following the signing of these agreements, the three Métis governments established a series of meetings under the name Tri-Council to allow for collaboration on self-determination and self-government. The Agreements outline core governance areas of citizenship, leadership selection, and government operations, including legislation, and set out a process for negotiating on agreements for expanded jurisdiction such as health care, education, and child welfare systems.

Despite the nature and wording of the Agreements in terms of recognition and jurisdiction, which took decades of negotiating and legal wrangling, Chartier characterized them as reducing the existing Métis rights to self-government to being contingent upon the blessing of the Government of Canada and were focused solely on internal governance affairs. McCallum characterized the agreements as real progress and a major step towards recognition and guaranteeing of Métis rights.

==== Métis National Council meetings ====
The Métis Nation Council bylaws require that meetings of the General Assembly are to happen every 12–18 months, and are called by the Board of Governors. The meetings of the Board of Governors are called by the president, the Board of Governors is responsible for calling meetings of the General Assembly and for setting the date of the election. If three presidents of the governing members, two of which must be founding members, submit a written request for a Board of Governors meeting, the president is to call and preside over the meeting.

On 9 August 2019, President Glen McCallum (Métis Nation—Saskatchewan), President Audrey Poitras (Métis Nation of Alberta), and President Margaret Froh (Métis Nation of Ontario) submitted a letter to Chartier to call a Board of Governors meeting. On 16 August 2019, Chartier responded to the letter and did not call a Board of Governors meeting, claiming that Métis Nation of Ontario was not complying with the resolution of the General Assembly that had put them on probation, and that that needed to be dealt with before a meeting would be called.

At the Métis Nation Citizens Forum on Identity, Citizenship & Homeland in Saskatoon, SK, Chartier provided the following answer when asked about why he had not called a Board of Governors meeting:

"I could see the writing on the wall—very clearly. And my term ends next month, the end of next month, the end of April, April 28. But our bylaws also say that the Board of Governors can call an election during the third year of that assembly. So it was very clear, it was very transparent: they wanted a board of governors meeting to call for an election, possibly this past May, to reward one of their own and take over the Métis National Council and keep the Métis Nation of Ontario in—to defeat the General Assembly, the decision of the General Assembly.

And I said 'Pfff, I’m not going to fall into that trap. I’m not going to sacrifice the Métis National Council over being criticized for not calling a meeting.' Why call a meeting where you know you’re going to be executed? I mean, it happened to me before in 2007, where they got together and kicked me out for nine months till the Assembly—and a proper one—was reconvened with the proper delegates from Alberta where I was re-elected by the will of the people that came there who were allowed to express themselves.

So I wasn’t going to allow that to happen. I spoke to President Chartrand, and he said 'Yeah, that’s the correct decision to do. I will back up that decision.' So that meeting hasn’t taken place."

— President Clément Chartier, Métis Nation Citizens Forum on Identity, Citizenship & Homeland, Saskatoon, SK, 9 March 2020

The reason for Manitoba Métis Federation President David Chartrand supporting this decision was provided in a news article published the following day, in which it was reported that Chartrand was afraid that Métis Nation of Alberta, Métis Nation—Saskatchewan, and Métis Nation of Ontario would gain control over the Métis National Council by voting as a bloc.

As of 28 April 2021, there has not been a meeting of the Métis National Council Board of Governors nor General Assembly since November 2018. A meeting was to be held in April 2020 to hold an election for Métis National Council President, and Chartier had announced that he would not be seeking re-election, but the meeting was cancelled. McCallum and Poitras have refused to attend any meetings of the Métis National Council because they do not see the suspension of Métis Nation of Ontario and would not attend unless they were allowed to attend. Due to the lack of Métis National Council governance meetings, McCallum, Poitras, and Froh submitted a letter to Minister of Crown-Indigenous Relations Carolyn Bennett, calling on the Government of Canada to copy all communications with Métis National Council to the three governing members, to freeze all funds to Métis National Council until the governance issues are resolved, and to negotiate with the three governments on funding rather than through Métis National Council.

=== COVID-19 ===
On 15 September 2020, McCallum voluntarily went for COVID-19 testing at the drive-through testing site in Saskatoon offered by the Saskatchewan Health Authority. Métis Nation—Saskatchewan had recently instituted a policy that all leadership and executive should regularly be getting tested for COVID-19 as a precaution. McCallum was asymptomatic when he went for testing, and had proactively went for testing because of the nature of his work as a public figure. According to Saskatchewan's chief medical officer, Dr Saqib Shahab, as McCallum had voluntarily went for testing, had not been in contact with anyone known to be infected, and was not symptomatic, he was not required to self-isolate following testing.

There was a Provincial Métis Council meeting to held 19–20 September 2020 at Hawood Inn in Waskesiu Lake located in Prince Albert National Park. At approximately 4:30 P.M. on 18 September 2020, McCallum was notified by health officials that he had tested positive for the SARS CoV 2 virus. Upon learning of the diagnosis, McCallum is reported to have immediately left the meeting and went directly into isolation in accordance with public health orders, and worked closely with the Saskatchewan Health Authority to minimize potential spread. The other attendees at the meeting were notified very quickly and immediately went into isolation, and the hotel closed for cleaning as a precaution.

Following the announcement of McCallum testing positive, there were a lot of accusation circulating in the media. Many people were saying that he should have been in isolation simply because he decided to get tested. Others made claims that several people were showing COPID-19 symptoms within three days of the meeting. The hotel owner made accusations that McCallum had not been following public health orders, but later would not confirm these accusations. Métis Nation—Saskatchewan communicated that they had been following public health guidelines at the meeting and expressed dismay at media for publishing rumours and biased, inaccurate content. In the end, there were no reported incidents of spread of the virus from McCallum to anyone else.

Former Métis Nation—Saskatchewan President and a local president, Jim Durocher, penned a letter calling for McCallum's resignation, attacking McCallum for not self-isolating following his voluntary testing, and referring to unverified and anonymous claims circulating in the media. McCallum responded to Durochers accusations and call to resign, reprimanding Durochers for relying on "in accurate reporting, comments by anonymous sources and, frankly, gossip," saying that Durocher's accusations and actions were reprehensible and were a discredit to Durocher's past leadership, and called on Durocher to put aside political animosity and work together for the benefit of the community.

=== Citizenship requirements for electors ===
On 23 November 2019, the Métis Nation Legislative Assembly passed a resolution to amend the Saskatchewan Métis Elections Act 2007 to require people to hold citizenship with Métis Nation—Saskatchewan in order to be eligible to vote.

After the COVID-19 pandemic struck Saskatchewan and both the provincial health guidelines and directives from the Métis Nation—Saskatchewan Ministry of Health limited the size of gatherings and many workplaces had to close, the Métis Nation—Saskatchewan Registry closed on 16 March 2020 and the staff transitioned to remote work for the duration of the pandemic.

The changes to the Saskatchewan Métis Elections Act 2007 and the closure of the physical office of the Registry led some people to challenge the requirement for citizenship to eligible to vote in the election. A local president and former Métis Nation—Saskatchewan president, Jim Durocher, distributed a letter to all members of the Métis Nation Legislative Assembly in which he made several questionable statements in which he challenged the resolutions and questioned the enforcement of those resolutions. On 6 January 2021, Durocher co-wrote and distributed a letter in collaboration with Métis National Council President Clément Chartier to members of the MNLA in which they quoted Métis Nation—Saskatchewan legislation to present an questionable argument as the basis of a resolution for the Métis Nation Legislative Assembly the following month, and called upon the members of the MNLA to overturn the requirement to hold citizenship to be eligible to vote in Métis Nation—Saskatchewan elections.

At the 20–21 Métis Nation Legislative Assembly, the Assembly adopted an agenda that did not include the resolutions presented by members of the Assembly. However, the Assembly did amend many parts of the Saskatchewan Métis Elections Act 2007, including finalizing some requirements from the November 2019 resolution. During the course of the debate on the resolution, the Assembly did discuss the topic of not requiring citizenship for the 2021 Métis Nation—Saskatchewan General Election and voted to continue with citizenship as a requirement to be eligible to vote.

Following the close of the February 2021 Métis Nation Legislative Assembly, Chartier, Durocher, and fellow local presidents Darlene McKay, Gail Johnson, and Sheila Andrews, filled for an injunction to strike the requirement to hold citizenship in Métis Nation—Saskatchewan for the 2021 Métis Nation—Saskatchewan General Election. In the ruling, the judge ruled that the decisions of Métis Nation—Saskatchewan were not subject to judicial review, that the amendments to the Saskatchewan Métis Elections Act 2007 were reasonably consistent with the Constitution of the Métis Nation—Saskatchewan, and that the amendments that were made were done so in procedurally fair manner.

During the 2021 Métis Nation—Saskatchewan General Election, candidates that opposed McCallum accused him of being the one responsible for the requirement for electors to have Métis Nation—Saskatchewan citizenship to be eligible to vote, accusing him of voter suppression and disenfranchising Métis in Saskatchewan, despite it being the Métis Nation Legislative Assembly that made the changes.

== Personal ==
=== Addictions ===
The community where McCallum grew up, Pinehouse, had major issues with alcoholism and violence and had become a way of life. This led his brother, Leonard, to establish an addictions program called Recovery Lake. McCallum was an alcoholic, and attended Recovery Lake, helped to establish the program, and has been sober since 1988.

=== Family ===
Glen in married to Verna McCallum. His brother, Leonard, established the Recovery Lake program near Pinehouse.

Glen's father attended residential school in Beauval, Saskatchewan, and lost his foot at age 12 in a threshing accident. Both of Glen's parents drank, and there was violence and poverty at home growing up. Glen's father died of alcoholism in 1987. His mother died in 2020.

== See also ==
- Métis Nation—Saskatchewan
- Métis National Council
- Métis Nation of Ontario
- Manitoba Métis Federation
- Métis Nation of Alberta
- Métis Nation British Columbia
