= Gerald Morin =

Métis politician (born 1961)

Vice President, Métis Nation—Saskatchewan
- In office 27 May 2017 – 29 May 2021
- President: Glen McCallum
- In office 8 September 2012 – 27 May 2017
- President: Robert Doucette

President, Métis National Council
- In office February 1992 – January 2003
- Preceded by: W. Yvon Dumont
- Succeeded by: Audrey Poitras (interim)

President, Métis Nation of Saskatchewan
- In office February 1992 – February 1995
- Preceded by: Jim Durocher
- Succeeded by: Clement Chartier

Personal details
- Born: June 27, 1961 Green Lake, Saskatchewan
- Education: University of Saskatchewan

Gerald Morin (born 1961 in Green Lake, Saskatchewan) is a Métis politician who served as president of the Métis National Council and the Métis Nation—Saskatchewan, also serving as vice president for the latter.

Morin is a recognized expert in Métis governance and history. He has asserted that the Métis formed a self‐governing nation when Louis Riel declared the provisional government and established the Legislative Assembly of Assiniboia. Through his political work, Morin has worked towards recognition of the Métis right to self-government, asserting that Métis self-government is "not something that can be granted to us by the state, we already possess this right," and that self-government is the "vision that our people fought and died for at Red River, that is the vision that our people fought and died for at Batoche."

== Presidency of Métis Nation of Saskatchewan ==
Gerald Morin first entered Métis politics in 1989 when he was first elected as the Secretary of the Métis Society of Saskatchewan (renamed the Métis Nation of Saskatchewan in 1993 and Métis Nation—Saskatchewan in 2000). He was elected and served as the first president of the Métis Nation—Saskatchewan from 1992–1995. During his time as president, Morin advanced an agenda that included the Métis Nation—Saskatchewan launched a land claim in Northwest Saskatchewan, efforts to restore Métis harvesting rights, and sought to create a Métis land base in Saskatchewan.

=== Charlottetown Accord ===
During the first eight months of his term as president, Morin and the Provincial Métis Council were involved in discussions on recognition of Métis rights as part of the Charlottetown Accord, including the right to self-government. During the negotiation process, the Métis Nation Accord was agreed to and included in the Charlottetown Accord. The Accord symbolized that all governments in Canada recognized and acknowledged that the Métis have an inherent right to self-government. Ultimately, the Charlottetown Accord was rejected by a majority of Canadians in a national referendum in 1992.

=== Declaration of self-government and Constitution ===
In the October 1992, the Métis Society of Saskatchewan established the Métis Society of Saskatchewan Self-Government and Restructuring Committee through a decision of the Provincial Métis Council. The Committee consisted of eight members, with representatives from the four branches of the government: Provincial Métis Council, the Métis Elders' Senate, the Métis Women of Saskatchewan, and the Métis Youth Committee. The Committee met over the following year in addition to holding provincial workshops and consultations. The Métis Society of Saskatchewan and the Government of Saskatchewan signed a Bilateral Process Agreement in June 1993 that evolved into a tripartite partnership with the Government of Canada, and conducted research on Métis self-government for the Royal Commission on Aboriginal People. Through these efforts, a constitution was drafted by Morin that amended and endorsed at the Métis Society of Saskatchewan Annual General Assembly in December 1993. With the adoption of Constitution, the Métis people of Saskatchewan declared themselves self-governing with the Métis Nation of Saskatchewan as their democratic government.

=== Northwest Saskatchewan Land Claim ===
On 1 March 1994, the Métis Nation of Saskatchewan filled a major land claim in the Court of Queen's Bench in Saskatoon. This land claim covered 145,000 km², and claimed ownership and jurisdiction over the lands and resources in that area, as well as compensation for being deprived of the land and resources and the destruction of the environment in the land claim area. The land claim was filed as a test case for Saskatchewan, with the goal of further land claims across Saskatchewan.

=== Métis Harvesting Rights ===
In January 1994, the Manitoba Court of Queen's Bench acquitted two Métis who had been charged with killing a moose out of season, finding that they had been exercising their Aboriginal right to harvest. In January 1994, Métis Nation of Saskatchewan held a news conference in Saskatoon where Morin stated that the Métis of Saskatchewan clearly felt that they have a right to hunt and are prepared to exercise this right following the favourable rulings of the courts. The Métis Nation of Saskatchewan provided a six-month postponement on exercising these rights to provide time for the provincial and federal government to work with the Métis Nation of Saskatchewan in drafting a management agreement. This was happening while the Métis Wildlife and Conservation Act was being drafted, which was ratified by the Métis Nation Legislative Assembly in July 1994.

== Presidency of Métis National Council ==
Morin was elected and served as Métis National Council president from 1992–2003. During his time as president, Morin worked to establish strong governance structures within the Métis Nation Council and its governing members, and given the duties assigned to the President of the Métis National Council as Chief Spokesperson and in promoting and enhancing the interests if the Métis Nation, his mandate helped to guide the advocacy, governance, and political direction for the Métis Nation in Canada and influenced the relationship between the Métis Nation and The Crown.

=== Relocating Métis National Council office ===
The Métis National Council office was originally located in Saskatoon, SK following the Council's establishment in 1983. In 1993, the Métis National Council moved its office from Saskatoon, SK to Ottawa, ON to better concentrate on lobbying efforts and to more effectively effect change on the national level, and it was seen as a good move politically because of the proximity to Parliament and the headquarters of federal departments.

=== Métis Nation Agenda ===
During his time in office, as part of his mandate, Morin advanced the Métis Nation Agenda, which focused on four pillars:

- The Proper Recognition of Louis Riel and the Métis Nation within Canada
- A Métis Rights Strategy
- National Definition, Enumeration, and Registry for Métis
- Strengthening Métis Self-Government

The Proper Recognition of Louis Riel and the Métis Nation within Canada

Louis Riel is a controversial figure in Canadian history, but to the Métis he is seen as a leader who fought and gave his life for Métis rights, land, and the continued existence of the Métis as a people. Under the Agenda, the Métis National Council sought the proper recognition Riel, making it the crux for future negotiations with Canada and efforts towards reconciliation. This includes giving effect to Riel's vision for the Métis in addition to honouring the contributions of Riel and the Métis Nation within Canada and to Confederation.

A Métis Rights Strategy

The federal and provincial governments' positions, policies, and laws were based on the premise that the Métis did not have rights to land, title, harvesting, and resources within the Métis Homeland. The Métis National Council affirmed the Métis' Aboriginal rights that are recognized and affirmed in s.35 of the Constitution Act, 1982, and challenged the systemic and blatant discrimination by governments. In doing so, the Métis National Council worked to establish a negotiating table with the Government of Canada, and developed a two-pronged strategy of negotiations and litigation with various activities and initiatives planned to support this strategy.

National Definition, Enumeration and Registry for Métis

At the Métis National Council's 18th Annual General Assembly in September 2002, two resolutions were passed, one that established a National Definition of Métis, and a second that defined the terms in the National Definition of Métis. Subsequently, this definition was adopted by the five governing members of the Métis National Council.

Work on enumeration of Métis in Canada and the establishment of a Métis registries was seen as a vital, and had been part of the political agenda of the Métis National Council since its inception. There was a goal to establish a national registry to maintain the citizenship list, with the provincial registries using national standards for verifying citizenship.

Strengthening Métis Self-Government

The Métis Nation Agenda envisioned strengthening the self-government structures and institutions of the Métis Nation at the national, provincial, and community levels. This included enhancing the current Métis-specific delivery structures, identifying priority areas to address disparities, and engaging in strategic activities to establish strong governance.

=== Powley case ===
The R. v. Powley case was a defining case for Métis citizens across the homeland in recognition of their Aboriginal harvesting rights. The Métis National Council supported the litigation with the Métis Nation of Ontario and obtained intervener status to ensure that the voice and position of the Métis Nation were heard during the proceedings.

=== National constitution and ballot box ===
As part of his 2001 election platform, Morin laid out a vision for the future cooperation between the governing members of the Métis National Council and moving forward on specific initiatives that included strengthening the Métis National Council to become a national government of the Métis. This included consultations towards realizing a Métis Nation Constitution and efforts to enhance democratic processes within the Métis Nation through establishing a national ballot box election for the President of the Métis National Council to allow every Métis citizen the right to vote. The goal was to establish the national ballot box election by 2004.

== Vice presidency of Métis Nation—Saskatchewan ==
In 2012, Morin returned to Métis politics in Saskatchewan when he was elected as Vice President of the Métis Nation—Saskatchewan, serving under President Robert Doucette. In 2017, he was re-elected as vice president under President Glen McCallum. During his second term, Morin was appointed to be the Minister of Intergovernmental Affairs and Governance and the Minister of Justice.

=== Dispute with Executive and Provincial Métis Council ===
During his first term as vice president, Morin was the leader of a faction of the Provincial Métis Council in a dispute with then-president, Robert Doucette. The dispute revolved around who had the authority to decide on agendas and setting the date of Provincial Métis Council meetings. Morin and 11 of the Provincial Métis Council members, representing the majority and ability to assembly a quorum, were concerned about financial decision making being controlled by the Executive and lack of reporting to the Provincial Métis Council, and wanted to review the financial records of the Métis Nation—Saskatchewan. The Morin faction attempted to wrest control of the finances from the Executive to place it in the hands of the Provincial Métis Council. Subsequently, the Doucette faction, consisting of the President Robert Doucette, Treasurer Louis Gardiner, and Secretary May Henderson, attempted to call a Métis Nation Legislative Assembly to suspend Morin and the Provincial Métis Council members who had sided with him, which was subsequently overturned by the Saskatchewan Court of Queen’s Bench. Due to the inability to hold a session of the Métis Nation Legislative Assembly due to the disputes, federal funding provided through Aboriginal Affairs and Northern Development Canada (AANDC) was pulled by the Government of Canada effective 1 November 2014.

In a subsequent ruling, Saskatchewan Court of Queen’s Bench ordered that a Métis Nation Legislative Assembly be held by 19 June 2015. The session of the Métis Nation Legislative Assembly did not happen, and the Doucette faction attempted to have the Morin faction found in contempt of court. In the decision, the judge found that the Doucette faction had refused to meet with the Morin faction and did not attend meetings that were necessary to plan and secure funding for the Métis Nation Legislative Assembly, and found that the Morin faction had aimed to comply with the court order through prompt and proactive efforts. Instead, the court found significant concerns regarding the actions of the Doucette faction, including refusing to participate in meetings because Doucette had insisted that the meetings be on their terms, that there was a lack of cooperation and active or passive resistance by the Doucette faction, and that Doucette had failed in his obligation as president and was in breach of his duty.

=== Self-government ===
In his role as vice president, Morin worked to advance the rights of Métis, including self-government. In this work, Morin was a signatory to the Canada-Metis Nation Accord, the Memorandum of Understanding on Advancing Reconciliation, the Framework Agreement for Advancing Reconciliation, and the Métis Government Recognition and Self-Government Agreement. These agreements establish the process by which the Government of Canada and the Métis Nation negotiate on a nation-to-nation, government-to-government basis on matters such as recognition of Métis rights, addressing unresolved claims and grievances, access resources for programs and service delivery, and advance recognition of self-government.

=== Constitutional reform ===
Morin, in his role at the Minister of Intergovernmental Affairs and Governance, put forward a motion at the April 2019 Métis Nation Legislative Assembly to initiate a process of constitutional reform. After the Métis Nation Legislative Assembly gave the mandate, he led a team to undertake a constitutional reform process for the Constitution of the Métis Nation—Saskatchewan in 2019. This process involved a province-wide consultation process to engage with Métis citizens on the Constitution and related legislation.

==== Establishing judicial tribunal ====
As a part of the constitutional reform process, work was initiated towards the establishment of a judicial tribunal. In the original vision of the 1993 Constitution of the Métis Nation of Saskatchewan, the Senate was established as the judicial arm of the Métis Nation of Saskatchewan government. However, this role was removed from the Senate in 2008. As the Minister of Justice, Morin oversaw the consultation and review process for preparing to establish a judicial tribunal arm of Métis Nation—Saskatchewan.

== Personal life ==
Morin received a Bachelor of Laws in 1987 at the University of Saskatchewan, Saskatoon, Saskatchewan.

He has three daughters, Crystal, Roberta, and Chayla; along with five grandchildren, Shataya, Dakota, CJ, Kayden, and Ryan. He is the son of Bella Kennedy and grandson of Leon Morin, and he was raised in Green Lake, Saskatchewan. He has two dogs, Bapie and Bella.

== See also ==
- Métis
- Métis Nation—Saskatchewan
- Métis National Council
- Métis Nation of Ontario
- Manitoba Métis Federation
- Métis Nation of Alberta
- Métis Nation British Columbia
