= Youth Indigenize the Senate of Canada =

Indigenous youth of Canada

Youth Indigenize the Senate is an initiative of the Senate of Canada wherein Canadians nominate Indigenous youth leaders from across Canada to share their ideas and experiences with the Senate Committee on Aboriginal Peoples during an official public hearing, taking place annually in June.

The Senate Committee on Aboriginal Peoples has a history of hearing from the Indigenous youth of Canada. In November 2011, the committee heard the testimony of witnesses from the National Inuit Youth Council, the Assembly of First Nations National Youth Council, and the Métis Nation of Ontario Youth Council on a discussion about issues facing indigenous youth. Since 2016, each June, the Senate Committee on Aboriginal Peoples has brought young Indigenous leaders from across Canada to the Senate—Aboriginal History Month in Canada to share their thoughts and experiences.

The Committee seeks youth feedback on issues plaguing Indigenous communities across Canada, including broken treaties, housing shortages, and economic marginalization. From identifying challenges to sharing success stories, the Committee seeks to provide Indigenous youth a platform where their voices can be heard. Indigenous youth are nominated by people in their community to be part of the program.

In 2021, the hearing took place virtually on June 28.

== History ==
=== 2016 ===
The first Youth Indigenize the Senate event took place in June 2016. The event brought 12 Indigenous youth leaders to the Senate to testify before the committee. As the inaugural event was focused on celebrating National Aboriginal Day in Canada, the Indigenous youth leaders shared their success stories with the Senate Committee on Aboriginal Peoples.

2016 youth leaders
Name	Heritage	Place of origin
Caitlin Tolley	Algonquin Anishinabe	Kitigan-Zibi, Quebec
Tenille McDougall	Tsuut'ina (Treaty Seven)	Fort Macleod, Alberta
Willie Sellars	Secwepemc	Williams Lake Indian Band, British Columbia
Maatalii Okalik	Inuk	Panniqtuuq, Nunavut (lives in Iqaluit)
Kluane Adamek	Tlingit, Southern Tutchone, German and Irish (Kluane First Nation)	Whitehorse, Yukon
Justin "Jah'kota" Holness	Nakota Assiniboine and Jamaican	Winnipeg, Manitoba (lives in Ocean Man First Nation)
Kelly Duquette		Atikokan, Ontario
Katelyn LaCroix		Penetanguishene, Ontario
Jenna Burke	Mi'kmaw Nation	Charlottetown, Prince Edward Island
Mitch Case	First Degree Midewiwin (Three Fires Midewiwin Lodge)	Sault Ste. Marie, Ontario
Alethea Arnaquq-Baril	Inuk	Iqaluit, Nunavut
Shelby Angalik	Inuk	Arviat, Nunavut

=== 2017 ===
In its second installment, on 7 June 2017, Youth Indigenize the Senate had two components: the Indigenous Youth Leaders Program and the Youth Forum. Over the course of their day on Parliament Hill, youth leaders met with Senate leaders and testified before the Senate Committee on Aboriginal Peoples, this time lending their voices to the committee's study on a new relationship between Canada and Indigenous peoples.

The day also featured a youth forum that hosted workshops on reconciliation for more than 50 Indigenous and non-Indigenous youths from the Ottawa area.

2017 youth leaders
Name	Heritage	Origin
Andrea Andersen	Inuk	Makkovik, Nunatsiavut (Labrador)
Jacquelyn Cardinal	Nehiyaw	Sucker Creek Cree First Nation, Treaty 8 Territory, Alberta
Perry Kootenhayoo	Alexis Nakota Sioux First Nation	Edmonton, Alberta
Modeste McKenzie	Dene Métis	La Ronge, Saskatchewan
Tiffany Monkman	Métis	Winnipeg, Manitoba
Jennifer O'Bomsawin	Wendat and Abenaki	Odanak, Quebec
Stephen Puskas	Inuk	Yellowknife, Northwest Territories
Holly Jane Sock	Mi'kmaq	Elsipogtog First Nation, New Brunswick
Chris Tait	Gitxsan	Gitxsan Nation, British Columbia

=== 2018 ===
For the third year in a row, the Senate of Canada invited Indigenous youth from across the country to participate in Youth Indigenize the Senate Day on 6 June 2018, on Parliament Hill.

Nine Indigenous youth testified about their experiences as leaders and shared their visions for a new relationship between Canada and First Nations, Inuit, and Métis peoples, which is the focus of an ongoing study by the Senate Committee on Aboriginal Peoples. The group was also given a tour of Parliament Hill and met one-on-one with several senators to discuss issues like education in their communities and protecting Indigenous culture.

2018 youth leaders
Name	Heritage	Origin
Colette Trudeau	Métis	British Columbia
Spirit River Striped Wolf	First Nations	Alberta
Rae-Anne Harper	First Nations and Métis	Saskatchewan
Amanda Fredlund	First Nations	Manitoba
Theoren Swappie	First Nations	Quebec
Kayla Bernard	First Nations	Nova Scotia
Kieran McMonagle	Métis	Ontario
Bryanna Brown	Inuk	Newfoundland and Labrador
Ruth Kaviok	Inuk	Nunavut

=== 2019 ===
2019 youth leaders
Name	Heritage	Origin
Aurora Leddy	Métis	Alberta
Christine Luza	Ojibwe (M’Chigeeng)	Ontario
Jukipa Kotierk	Inuk	Igloolik, Nunavut (lives in Iqaluit)
Karlee Johnson	Miꞌkmaw	Eskasoni First Nation, Nova Scotia
Megan Hébert-Lefebvre	Abenaki	Quebec
Richard Lush	First Nations	Prince Edward Island
Taylor Morriseau	First Nations (Peguis)	Niverville, Manitoba
Trevor Dubois	Métis	Prince Albert, Saskatchewan
