= Jim Sinclair (politician) =

- Born: John James Sinclair; June 3, 1933; Punnichy, Saskatchewan, Canada
- Died: November 9, 2012 (aged 79)

John James Sinclair (June 3, 1933 – November 9, 2012) was a Non-Status Indian leader from Punnichy, Saskatchewan, Canada. Despite his Non-Status, rather than Métis, background, for many years he was one of the pre-eminent Métis leaders in Canada. Jim served as president of the Métis Society of Saskatchewan, and the Association of Métis and Non-Status Indians of Saskatchewan (AMNSIS), forerunners of the contemporary Métis Nation - Saskatchewan.

He had a difficult youth as a road allowance person, and struggled with alcohol addiction. After beating his addiction Jim worked extensively at community level organization among his people, to get them to sober up, take responsibility for their lives, and to lead others in the struggle for their rights. He learned to become an expert at using the media, at using confrontation politics to force government to deal with peoples' immediate needs and rights. He focused on issues such as housing, institutional racism, Aboriginal land rights, hunting, fishing, and trapping rights, and education. He was part of the team who helped to establish a major network of alcohol treatment centers, along with the Gabriel Dumont Institute of Métis Studies and Applied Research.

In 1987, during the Canadian constitutional talks that led to the Meech Lake Accord, Sinclair took a strong stance against Premiers Grant Devine of Saskatchewan and Bill Vander Zalm of British Columbia for what he saw as their antagonism to Métis rights. From 1994 to 1996, Mr. Sinclair led the national Congress of Aboriginal Peoples. From 1996 up until his death he was President of the Congress of Aboriginal Peoples of Saskatchewan.

Sinclair was awarded the Order of the Métis Nation in 2004 for a lifetime of service to the Aboriginal community. On October 25, 2012, he was honoured at the Saskatchewan Indian Nation Assembly.

Sinclair died on November 9, 2012, at the age of 79 after battling cancer.

== See also ==
- Politics of Saskatchewan
- Métis National Council
