= Lorna Docken =

Lorna Docken is an Indigenous leader in Canada, who served as an interim President of Métis Nation—Saskatchewan in early 2004, when Clément Chartier became president of the Métis National Council. She previously served as vice-president for the provincial association and as Secretary prior to that. She did not seek re-election to any Métis Nation—Saskatchewan executive post for its controversial 26 May 2004 election.

Lorna's oldest son is Indigenous musician Joey Stylez, for whom she acts as Manager.
