= Yvon Dumont =

Canadian politician

The Honourable Yvon Dumont OM

21st Lieutenant Governor of Manitoba
- In office March 5, 1993 – March 2, 1999
- Monarch: Elizabeth II
- Governors General: Ray Hnatyshyn; Roméo LeBlanc
- Premier: Gary Filmon
- Preceded by: George Johnson
- Succeeded by: Peter Liba

President of the Métis National Council
- In office 1988–1993
- Succeeded by: Gerald Morin

Personal details
- Born: January 21, 1951 (age 75) St. Laurent, Manitoba
- Occupation: small business owner, community organizer
- Profession: Politician

W. Yvon Dumont, OM (born January 21, 1951) is a Manitoba politician and office-holder. In 1993, he became the first member of Manitoba's Métis community to be appointed as the province's Lieutenant Governor, the 21st to hold that office. He was born in St. Laurent, Manitoba.

He became involved in the Manitoba Metis Federation in 1967, and became its director for the Interlake region in 1972. He was chosen Executive Vice-President of the Federation in 1973, and served as its President from 1984 to 1993.

Dumont was also a founding member of the Native Council of Canada in 1972, and served as President of the Métis National Council from 1988 to 1993. He has participated as a representative of the MMF at Canadian First Ministers' conference, and has been actively involved in constitutional debates concerning First Nations and Métis peoples. Dumont has rejected the integration of Métis services into larger Indigenous institutions, expressing concern that Métis distinctiveness could be lost.

Dumont has also been a municipal councillor in St. Laurent, and was on the Board of Governors for the University of Manitoba. He received a Manitoba Metis Federation Award in 1993, and a National Aboriginal Achievement Award, now the Indspire Awards, in 1996.

Dumont's appointment as Lt. Governor of Manitoba coincided with a national reappraisal of Métis leader Louis Riel's role in the province's creation. Once regarded as a rebel and an outlaw, Riel has in recent years been accepted as a Father of Confederation for his role in establishing a provisional government in the Red River Colony. The appointment of Dumont as Lt. Governor undoubtedly reflected this changed perspective.

The position of Lt. Governor is largely ceremonial, and Dumont had very little influence over the Progressive Conservative government of Gary Filmon.

Dumont was appointed to the Order of Manitoba in 2001. He ran again for the leadership of the MMF in 2003, but was defeated by David Chartrand.

== Arms ==
Coat of arms of Yvon Dumont

Adopted
December 15, 1993
Crest
Issuant from a coronet of Red River cart wheels conjoined by infinity signs set on a rim Or an arm embowed proper habited Azure and holding a banner flying to the dexter Azure charged with an infinity sign Argent
Escutcheon
Azure a Red River cart wheel supporting a coronet of alternating maple leaves and prairie crocus flowers set on a rim between four infinity signs three in chief one in base Or
Supporters
Dexter a buffalo Or armed unguled and gorged with a rope tied thereto a Red River cart wheel Azure Sinister a stallion Or unguled and gorged with a coronet as in the Crest Azure
Compartment
A grassy mound growing thereon prairie crocuses and prairie lilies proper
Motto
BRISER LES SOLITUDES (Breaking down solitudes)
Orders
The ribbon and insignia of a Companion of the Order of Canada.
DESIDERANTES MELIOREM PATRIAM (They desire a better country)

Order of precedence
Preceded by Pearl McGonigal as a former Lieutenant Governor of Manitoba	Order of precedence in Manitoba as a former Lieutenant Governor of Manitoba	Succeeded by Philip S. Lee as a former Lieutenant Governor of Manitoba
