= John Morrisseau =

Canadian politician

John Morrisseau CM
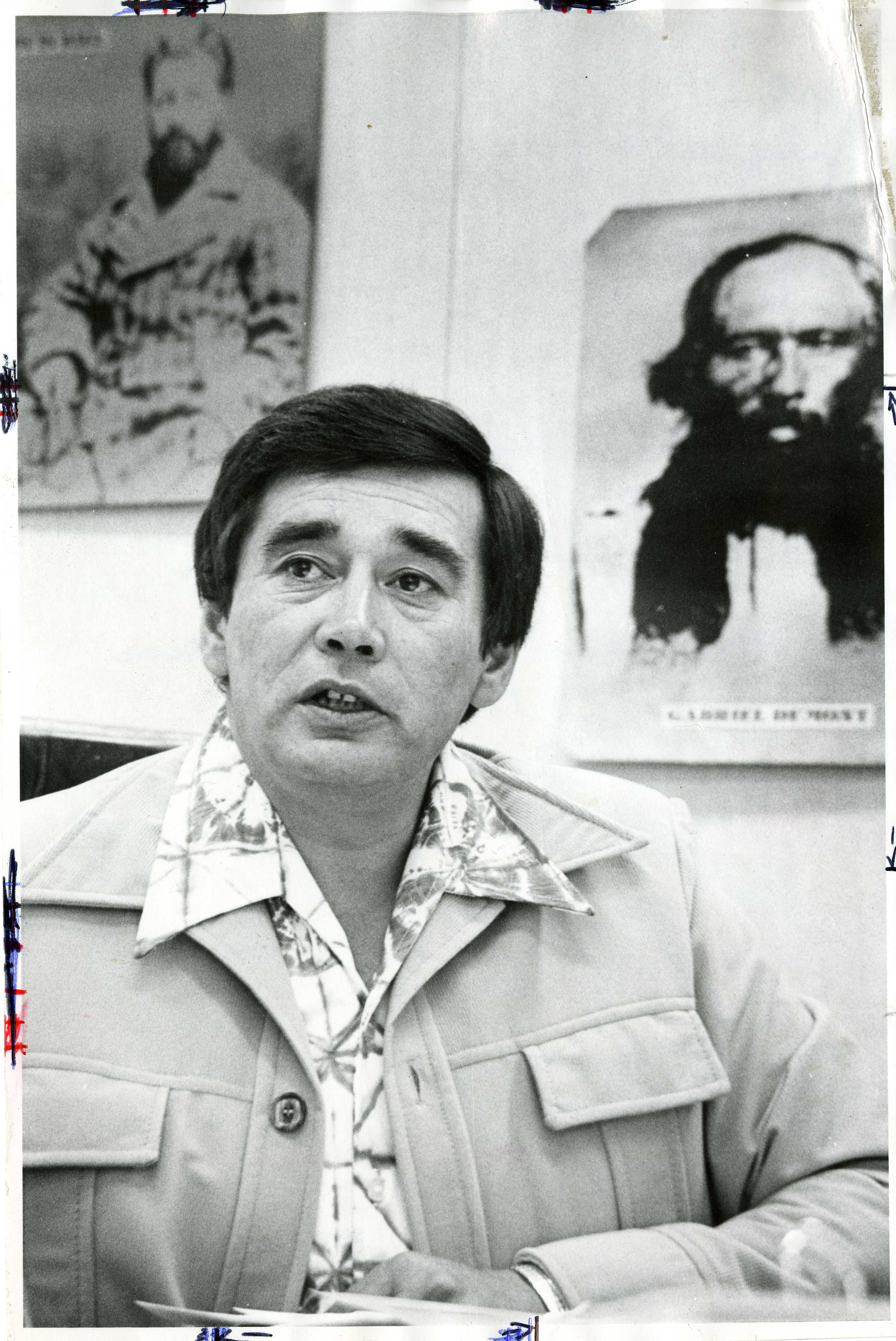
- Born: August 18, 1939 (age 86); St. Rose du Lac, Manitoba
- Spouse: Nellie Morrisseau (m. 1960)
- Children: 6

John Morrisseau CM (born 1939) is a Métis politician and former leader of the Manitoba Métis Federation (MMF) in Manitoba, Canada, from 1976 to 1981. He also served in the Manitoba provincial government as Assistant Deputy Minister and Deputy Minister of Northern Affairs from 1982 to 1987. John received the Order of Canada in 2021 for his work as a Metis historian and political activist.

== Early life ==
Morrisseau was born on August 18, 1939, in St. Rose du Lac, Manitoba, to Bella Moar and Ernest Morrisseau, who raised their children in Crane River, Manitoba. John Morrisseau enlisted in the Canadian Forces at age 18 and served for six years, leaving in 1964. In 1960, Morrisseau married Nellie Sinclair from Grand Rapids, Manitoba.

== Political career ==
In 1966 Morrisseau became politically active, becoming one of the founding members of the Manitoba Métis Federation.

In 1976, Morrisseau secured funding from the Liberal government of Prime Minister Pierre Trudeau to fund mutual claims research on land claim issues such as those outlined under the Manitoba Act. His team, which included Harry Daniels and Sam Sinclair, put together a proposal to support the claim to 1.4 million acres of crown land as well as 25 percent of all provincial park land.

In 1981, Morrisseau told the Métis and Non-Status Indian Constitutional Review Commission:

We can't draw up the rights of a new constitution when our rights entrenched in the Manitoba Act of 1870 are still outstanding. We're only putting ourselves back and giving them another way out. First of all, let's settle the issue that's there, that's the issue of land claims.

Morrisseau played a pivotal role in launching the land claims lawsuit MMF v. Canada.

Morrisseau said, "The work to file the land claim helped to re-kindle pride in Métis. It was time to lift our heads again to feel good about ourselves and it helped us to build strong Métis communities."

After leaving the MMF in 1981, Morrisseau joined the Howard Pawley NDP government as an Assistant Deputy Minister. He rose to become Deputy Minister of Northern Affairs, and served in that post until March 31, 1987.

Morrisseau is considered a Métis historian and is a recipient of the Order of the Métis Nation. As well, Morrisseau was appointed to the Order of Canada as part of their 2021 induction class.

== Later career ==
Now retired, Morrisseau and his wife Nellie live in Grand Rapids, Manitoba, where Morrisseau served as mayor of that town.

He is a member of the Indian Residential Schools Survivor Committee and was the Director of Public Participation for the Royal Commission on Aboriginal Peoples.
