= Clément Chartier =

Métis Canadian leader

Clément Chartier QC (born 1946) is a Métis Canadian leader. Chartier served as President of the World Council of Indigenous Peoples between 1984–87 and vice-president between 1993 and 1997.

Born in Île-à-la-Crosse, Saskatchewan, Chartier grew up in Buffalo Narrows, Saskatchewan. He became a lawyer in 1980, when he was called to the bar in Saskatchewan.

Chartier was president of Canada's Métis National Council from 24 October 2003 to 30 September 2021. He was president of Métis Nation—Saskatchewan 1998–2003, and turned over that office to interim president Lorna Docken when he became president of the Metis National Council. Chartier announced in November 2019 that Manitoba Metis Federation president David Chartrand would lead the MNC for national affairs until the council's next election and serve as the national spokesperson.

In 2021 Chartier stood for election to the presidency of the MN-S again, but was unsuccessful in his run.

== Education ==
- 1967: graduated from Athol Murray College of Notre Dame, Wilcox, Saskatchewan
- 1978: Bachelor of Laws, University of Saskatchewan, Saskatoon, Saskatchewan

== Awards and recognition ==
- February 2004: Queen's Counsel from Saskatchewan provincial government
