= Métis Nation British Columbia =

Organization representing Métis people in British Columbia

- MNBC logo since 2019
- Abbreviation: MNBC
- Formation: October 23, 1996; 30 years ago
- Type: Nonprofit
- Headquarters: 380 – 13401 108 Ave. Surrey, British Columbia, V3T 5T3
- Location: Surrey, British Columbia, Canada
- Region served: British Columbia
- Members: 27,000 (2024)
- President: Walter Mineault (removed)
- Vice President: Melanie Allard
- Budget: $79 million CAD (2021)
- Website: www.mnbc.ca
- Formerly called: Métis Provincial Council of British Columbia

The Métis Nation British Columbia (MNBC) is a nonprofit organization representing Métis people residing in the Canadian province of British Columbia. Originally established in 1996, it was one of the members of the Métis National Council until November 2024, and is recognized by both the provincial and federal governments as the representative for the Métis in the region.

The MNBC claims to represent over 27,000 registered members and advocates for over 98,000 British Columbia citizens who self-identify as Métis. It represents 39 'chartered communities', and has the stated mission of advocating for Métis rights in the province while providing programs and services to its members.

In 2021, the MNBC faced criticism from First Nation's in the province for their assertion of constitutionally protected aboriginal rights outside of the traditional Métis homeland.

== History ==
=== Foundation: 2003–2006 ===
The MNBC was established as a society on 23 October 1996 as the Métis Provincial Council of British Columbia. They ratified their convention on 27 September 2003, becoming the Métis Nation British Columbia. In 2006 they signed the Métis Nation Relationship Accord with the provincial government, which would focus on health, housing, economic opportunities and education.

=== Disputes with First Nations ===
In 2021, the BC First Nations Leadership Council, a group representing the BC Assembly of First Nations, First Nations Summit, and the Union of British Columbia Indian Chiefs, issued a rejection of the Métis Nation British Columbia's report "A Tale of Two Nations: Highlighting the Inequities of the Treatment of the Métis in BC". The rejection opposed the report's attempt to assert constitutionally protected Aboriginal rights, and accused the Métis Nation British Columbia of attempting to exercise "self-determination and self-government on lands that are not their own, and are well outside of the Métis Homeland".

=== Departure from the Métis National Council: 2024 ===
In October 2024, the Métis Nation British Columbia withdrew from the annual general meeting of the Métis National Council, citing issues with the governance structure following the departure of Métis Nation—Saskatchewan. The Saskatchewan group's departure followed that of the Manitoba Métis Federation in 2021 over the same issue; the inclusion of the Métis Nation of Ontario and the lack of verification of their members' heritage.

On November 30, 2024, the MNBC voted to withdraw from the MNC completely, citing concerns that as the Métis Nation of Alberta, as the sole remaining founding member, held the absolute majority, they felt they were not represented. In April 2025, they signed a cooperation agreement with Métis Nation–Saskatchewan.
