= Métis Nation—Saskatchewan =

Government representing Métis citizens in Saskatchewan

Overview
- Established: December 3, 1993; 32 years ago
- Country: Canada
- Polity: Métis Nation—Saskatchewan
- Leader: President
- Headquarters: Saskatoon, Saskatchewan
- Website: metisnationsk.com

Provincial Métis Council

History
- Founded: December 3, 1993; 32 years ago
- Preceded by: Métis Society of Saskatchewan

Leadership
- President: Glen McCallum
- Vice President: Michelle LeClair
- Seats: 18

Website
- https://metisnationsk.com/

Constitution
- Constitution of the Métis Nation—Saskatchewan

Métis Nation Legislative Assembly

History
- Founded: December 3, 1993; 32 years ago
- Preceded by: Métis Society of Saskatchewan

Leadership
- Speaker: John Lagimodiere
- Deputy Speaker: Michael Nolin
- Seats: ~154

Website
- https://metisnationsk.com/

Constitution
- Constitution of the Métis Nation—Saskatchewan

Métis Nation—Saskatchewan (MN-S or MNS) is a federally-recognized government that represents Métis people in the province of Saskatchewan, Canada. It was formerly affiliated with the Métis National Council. Glen McCallum was elected as president in 2017, reelected in 2021, and re-elected in 2025.

The government is led by an elected executive council called the Provincial Métis Council. The government has divided the province into 12 regions, and members within each region vote for their regional representative to the Provincial Métis Council. Within the 12 regions exist Métis locals, which are smaller governmental structures, each with an elected president. All of the above meet biannually at the Métis Nation Legislative Assembly with representatives from the government's youth and women departments to discuss matters affecting the Métis Nation in the province. The Métis Nation Legislative Assembly serves as the governing authority of the Métis Nation—Saskatchewan. Past presidents of Métis Nation—Saskatchewan include Lorna Docken, Clément Chartier, Jim "Jimmy D" Durocher, and Robert Doucette.

The government was originally named Métis Nation of Saskatchewan, but this was changed to Métis Nation—Saskatchewan at the Métis Nation Legislative Assembly on November 18, 2000.

== History ==
=== Early Métis governments in Saskatchewan ===
The earliest Métis governments in what is now Saskatchewan began prior to the 1870 Red River Resistance, but grew rapidly after that event. Southbranch Settlement communities such as Duck Lake, St. Laurent, St. Louis, Fish Creek, and Batoche grew along the South Saskatchewan River, growing from the original La Petite Ville mission. Each community had between 40 and 60 families, representing a considerable population. The communities of the Southbranch Settlement gathered on December 10, 1872 outside of the church at St. Laurent to form the Council of St. Laurent with Gabriel Dumont as their president. This council served as the administrative, judicial, and military body for these settlements. This council would adopt a constitution and codify laws that are known as the Laws of St. Laurent, using the Laws of the Buffalo Hunt as their foundation. This council set the precedent for all future Métis political activities in Saskatchewan.

=== Métis provisional government ===
The Métis of the Southbranch Settlement, concerned with the arrival of settlers and the need to secure title to their lands, petitioned the Government of Canada for title to the land that they had been living on for years. They grew frustrated with the stalling and general lack of response from the government, so the Council of St. Laurent decided to ask Louis Riel to return from exile in Montana to lead the Métis again. Riel would establish the Provisional Government of Saskatchewan led by the Exovedate council established in Batoche on March 19, 1885, that started the North-West Resistance. The Government of Canada responded with a military force, culminating at the Battle of Batoche where the Métis government was defeated.

=== Early political movements ===
The North-West Resistance resulted in the displacement of many Métis, leading to the loss of community. Trying to make the best of new opportunities, the Métis looked to farming and other ways to earn a living, but the Dust Bowl and Great Depression of the 1930s left many Métis destitute. Métis community councils began to form around this time, organizing themselves along the model of labour unions and using the name "locals" for their representative structure. This led to growing political awareness and social activism among Métis, demanding recognition of Métis rights.

Recognizing the need to establish a formal governance structure for their voice to be heard, Métis in Saskatchewan began to organize. The first Métis provincial political organization established after the province of Saskatchewan was established was in 1935 under Joe Ross, and was called Half-breeds of Saskatchewan. The organization was created to help with issues that Métis people were dealing with as a result of the Great Depression. The organization drafted their first constitution in 1937 and was renamed the Saskatchewan Métis Society. In 1943, the Saskatchewan Métis Association was formed to represent the Métis in the Northern part of Saskatchewan. This organization echoed, and often rivalled the efforts in the South by the Saskatchewan Métis Society. Despite strong growth in these organizations in the early years, internal divisions and turmoil as well as the start of the Second World War lead to the dissolution of these early Métis political organizations during the years of the War.

The Métis political movement would be restarted in the 1960s. In 1964, the Métis Association of Saskatchewan was established to focus on issues for Northern Métis people, and in 1965, the Métis Society of Saskatchewan was established to focus on issues for Southern Métis people. Recognizing the benefits of working together, the Métis Association of Saskatchewan and the Métis Society of Saskatchewan amalgamated in 1967 under the banner of Métis Society of Saskatchewan. The organization was renamed to the Association of Métis and Non-Status Indians of Saskatchewan (AMNSIS) in 1975 under the leadership of Jim Sinclair and included Non-status Indians within the membership of the organization, the Métis Society of Saskatchewan in 1988 following a referendum that decided that the organization would be Métis specific, the Métis Nation of Saskatchewan in 1993 in declaring a Métis government, and finally the Métis Nation—Saskatchewan in 2000.

Past leaders of these organizations include Joe LaRocque, Jim Brady, Malcolm Norris, Howard Adams, Jim Sinclair, Clifford LaRocque, Jimmy Durocher, Clément Chartier, Gerald Morin, and Robert Doucette.

== Métis government ==
=== Contemporary political structures ===
The Métis of Saskatchewan met to establish the Métis Nation of Saskatchewan (later renamed to Métis Nation—Saskatchewan in 2000), adopt a constitution in 1993, and declare the Métis Nation of Saskatchewan to be a self-governing body for the Métis of Saskatchewan. The first sitting of the Métis Nation Legislative Assembly was in 1994.

=== Self-government ===
Recognizing their distinct identity as Métis, the pursuit of Métis rights and self-determination, and seeking to be a third order of government, the Métis Nation—Saskatchewan was established as the government of the Métis of Saskatchewan.

MN—S has been operating through legislation for non-profit organizations. Though the Métis Nation—Saskatchewan has pushed the limits of what is possible within the legislation to move forward in shaping their governance and moving forward their political aspirations, the legislation has limited what MN—S is able to accomplish in terms of being self-governing and independent from the authority of the provincial and federal governments.

The Métis of Canada have been fighting for recognition of their Indigenous rights and their inherent right to practice them. Until Daniels v Canada (Indian Affairs and Northern Development), 2016 SCC 12, neither the Government of Saskatchewan nor Government of Canada wanted to hold responsibility of negotiating with the Métis. After the Daniels v Canada decision, the Government of Canada and the Métis Nation (represented by the Métis National Council and give members of its board of governors) signed the Canada–Métis Nation Accord on April 13, 2017 to start to repair the relationship between The Crown and the Métis Nation, to address the legacy of the wrongs committed against Métis people and the Métis Nation, to move forward on recognition of Métis rights, and to address the needs and issues facing Métis people. On July 20, 2018, Métis Nation—Saskatchewan and Canada signed the Framework Agreement for Advancing Reconciliation, which established the mechanism by which the negotiations on the shared objectives would be conducted. As negotiations have progressed between Canada and the Métis Nation, Métis Nation—Saskatchewan, along with Métis Nation of Ontario and Métis Nation of Alberta, signed the Métis Government Recognition and Self-Government Agreement with Canada on June 27, 2019.

MN—S previously supported Bill C-53, a federal bill tabled in 2023 that would establish a framework to "advance the recognition of the right to self-determination" by MN–S, the Manitoba Métis Federation, and Métis Nation of Ontario. In April 2024, MN—S withdrew its support, stating that "the one-size-fits-all approach proposed by the federal government was fundamentally flawed". The bill has also faced criticism over its recognition of the Métis Nation of Ontario, which has been accused of recognizing communities that do not have a sufficient population of Métis citizens as defined by the MNC's definition. In May 2024, MN—S announced its own proposed self-determination treaty, Kishchi Mashinaayikun Ooshchi Michif ("The sacred document of the Métis"), which it planned to present to the federal government in 2025 after ratification by its citizens.

=== The Métis Act ===
In 2002, the Government of Saskatchewan passed The Métis Act. The Constitution of the Métis Nation—Saskatchewan establishes the Métis Nation—Saskatchewan as a self-governing entity, and distinguishes the difference between the political existence as a Métis government from the existence as a non-profit corporation that provides programs and services. The Métis Act is the first legislation in Canada to recognize the political aspirations of the Métis. It established a bilateral process that empowers the elected leadership of the Métis Nation—Saskatchewan to negotiate as an equal partner with the Government of Saskatchewan on matters of interest to the Métis. This is an unprecedented de facto recognition in Canada of Métis aspirations of Métis Nation—Saskatchewan as a governance institution, though it stops short of recognizing the Nation—Saskatchewan as a government.

== Métis Nation—Saskatchewan governance structure ==
Traditional Métis governance practices of participatory governance and community councils are the basis for the governance structures and practices of the Métis Nation—Saskatchewan.

=== Locals ===
Locals are the basic unit of the Métis Nation—Saskatchewan, and they operate at the community level. Each local has an elected leadership that may include executive, board of directors, and other structures that a local establishes for their own governance that are consistent with the Constitution of the Métis Nation—Saskatchewan. Locals may also incorporate with the appropriate government. Locals have the responsibility of preparing communities for self-government, and they may seek the necessary finances and resources for their programs, services, and other objectives that they have established. To be an active local, a local must have a minimum of nine members, and they must hold local leadership elections every one to three years. A Métis citizen can belong to only one local at a time, and they must ordinarily reside in the area of the local for a minimum of six months before they are allowed to join a local (exceptions can be made for educational or medical purposes, or where there a local does not exist in a community). Locals were originally modelled on the labour movement, and were established as collective representative bodies for their members to assert their rights.

=== Urban councils ===
The Constitution of the Métis Nation—Saskatchewan allows for the establishment of urban councils. In the major cities of Saskatchewan, there are often more than one local, dividing either on geography or on mandate. The urban locals in a given city are allowed to establish an urban council if they choose to help move towards self-government.

=== Regions ===
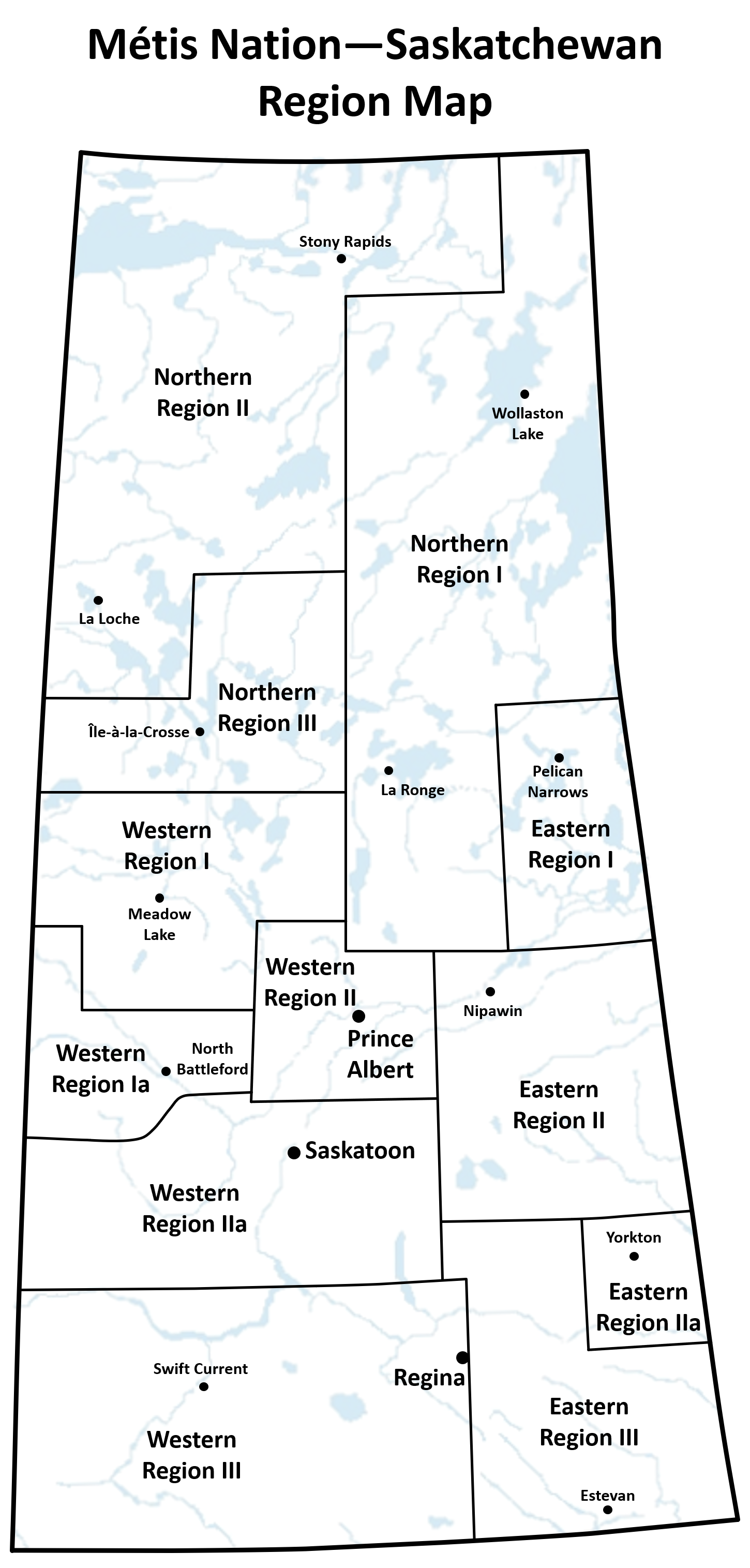
Map of the 12 regions of Métis Nation—Saskatchewan

The Métis Nation—Saskatchewan has divided the province of Saskatchewan into 12 regions:

- Eastern Region 1, including one local in Cumberland House
- Eastern Region 2, including nine locals in Melfort and other communities
- Eastern Region 2A, including seven locals in Yorkton and other communities
- Eastern Region 3, including nine locals in Fort Qu’Appelle and other communities
- Northern Region 1, including five locals in Weyakwin and other communities
- Northern Region 2, including seven locals in La Loche and other communities
- Northern Region 3, including ten locals in Green Lake and other communities
- Western Region 1, including ten locals in Meadow Lake and other communities
- Western Region 1A, including four locals in Lloydminster and other communities
- Western Region 2, including thirteen locals in Prince Albert and other communities
- Western Region 2A, including seven locals in Saskatoon and other communities
- Western Region 3, including six locals in Willow Bunch and other communities

Each region is governed by a regional council that consists of the local presidents in that region and the area director who serves as the chairperson of the regional council and sits as the regionally elected representative on the Provincial Métis Council. The regional councils have the authority to make appointments to the institutions and affiliates at the regional and provincial level. The regional council is responsible for supporting the locals to assume self-government, including helping to provide the necessary finances and resources for programs and services in accordance with the objectives and duties of the locals and the regional council. The regional council is responsible for providing direction to their area director with respect to the aims, objectives, and aspirations for the Métis Nation—Saskatchewan with respect to their respective region.

=== Executive ===
There are four executive members of the Métis Nation—Saskatchewan:

- President
- Vice President
- Secretary
- Treasurer

These executive positions are elected province wide, and the terms are four years. The president serves as the chief political spokesperson for the Métis Nation—Saskatchewan, and is responsible for assigning portfolios, subject to the approval of the Provincial Métis Council and ratification by the Métis Nation Legislative Assembly.

=== Provincial Métis Council ===
The Provincial Métis Council is responsible for ensuring the operations of the Métis Nation—Saskatchewan are running smoothly. The members of the Provincial Métis Council also serve as the directors for the Métis Nation—Saskatchewan Secretariat Inc.

The Provincial Métis Council ordinarily consists of 18 members:

- four executive members;
- 12 elected regional representatives (one from each of the 12 regions);
- one representative of the Métis Women of Saskatchewan (Les Filles de Madeleine); and
- one representative of the Provincial Métis Youth Council. Terms for the Executive are four years.

The Provincial Métis Council forms the cabinet of the Métis Nation—Saskatchewan government, and hold portfolios assigned to them by the President of the Métis Nation—Saskatchewan, subject to approval by the Provincial Métis Council and the Métis Nation Legislative Assembly. Each member of the Provincial Métis Council is responsible for ensuring that the affiliates, departments, programs, and services within their portfolio have the necessary finances and resources to operate effectively. They also sit at the chairperson of the affiliate(s) which are part of their portfolio. Terms for the regional representatives are four years.

=== Métis Nation Legislative Assembly ===
The Métis Nation Legislative Assembly is the governing authority of the Métis Nation—Saskatchewan. The Métis Nation Legislative Assembly is composed of the Provincial Métis Council (including the members of the Executive), four representatives of the Métis Women of Saskatchewan (Les Filles de Madeleine), four representatives of the Provincial Métis Youth Council, and all presidents of locals across the province (or the vice president of the local as the alternate if the president is unable to attend). Quorum for sittings of the Métis Nation Legislative Assembly is 75 members. The Métis Nation Legislative Assembly is to sit at least twice a year, though this has rarely been observed (often due to the lack of sufficient resources to hold the Métis Nation Legislative Assembly). The Métis Nation Legislative Assembly has the power to enact legislation, regulations, rules, and resolutions that are necessary to govern the affairs of the Métis Nation—Saskatchewan (including approving the budget of Métis Nation—Saskatchewan) and the conduct of citizens of the Métis Nation—Saskatchewan.

To oversee the sitting of the Métis Nation Legislative Assembly, the Métis Nation Legislative Assembly selects a speaker and deputy speaker. They are responsible for overseeing the setting of the Métis Nation Legislative Assembly, including the procedures, rules, and debates, and maintaining the decorum of the sitting. They also have the authority to have the Dumont's Scouts expel members or attendees from the Métis Nation Legislative Assembly if they do not follow the ruling of the speaker or otherwise disrupt the decorum on the Métis Nation Legislative Assembly. The speaker and deputy speaker serve as the chairperson and co-chairperson for the Annual General Assembly. The speaker and deputy speaker serve for a two-year term, subject to reappointment.

To assist in keeping the decorum of the Métis Nation Legislative Assembly, Dumont's Scouts are appointed by the Provincial Métis Council, and ratified by the Métis Nation Legislative Assembly. The Dumont's Scouts are generally Métis veterans.

Sitting members of the Métis Nation Legislative Assembly are eligible to be appointed to hold portfolios. Originally, this was limited to only members of the Provincial Métis Council, but this was expanded to members of the Métis Nation Legislative Assembly to provide more options for appointing people to hold portfolios.

=== Les Filles de Madeleine ===
Les Filles de Madeleine is the provincial organization in Saskatchewan that is mandated to provide a voice for Métis Nation women. The board of directors for Les Filles de Madeleine has one director elected from each of the 12 regions of the province.

The goals of Les Filles de Madeleine

- Promote the development of programs and services which seek to address issues and right of Métis women and which improves conditions which are unique to their circumstances; and
- Ensure at all times, a strong collaborative relationship between the Métis Nation—Saskatchewan, the political bodies within the Métis Nation—Saskatchewan; their directors and citizens as well as Les Filles de Madeleine Secretariat Inc., chapters and members which in turn supports the needs and interests of the grassroots women in Saskatchewan both regionally and at the national level.

The objectives of Les Filles de Madeleine Secretariat Inc. are:

1. To consult with its local chapters to identify issues, concerns and needs of Métis women and their family(ies);
2. To develop a continuum of support services and to seek funding resources for their delivery;
3. To deliver culturally sensitive programs and services which are tailored to meet the needs of Métis women and families;
4. To negotiate and partner with existing government and non-government organizations to access available programs and services which address the needs of Métis women and families;
5. To share information with the Métis Nation—Saskatchewan concerning the needs and conditions of members which need to be addressed by the Métis Nation;
6. To support and cooperate with the Métis Nation—Saskatchewan, Provincial Government and the Federal Government in obtaining resources, developing programs and delivering services directed at the needs of Métis women;
7. To support the Métis Nation—Saskatchewan in addressing and advancing rights of Métis people as an Indigenous people, including the right to self-government; and
8. To support the Métis Nation—Saskatchewan in its effort to have such rights entrenched in the Constitution of Canada and/or in the Saskatchewan legislation.

=== Provincial Métis Youth Council ===
The Provincial Métis Youth Council provides an opportunity to ensure that the voice of youth is always heard as a part of the Métis Nation—Saskatchewan government. Intricately incorporating youth within the governance structures of the Métis Nation—Saskatchewan helps to ensure that issues that youth are dealing with are not overlooked; it provides opportunities for mentoring and supporting the future leaders of the Métis Nation; and it brings together the different segments of the Métis population to work as a united front.

=== Senate ===
The Senate of the Métis Nation—Saskatchewan have a mostly ceremonial role. They provide opening and closing prayers at the Métis Nation Legislative Assembly, and they provide advice, guidance, and recommendations to the Métis Nation Legislative Assembly.

The Senate operates as a collective unit that represents, serves, and protects the best interests of the Métis people and the Constitution of the Métis Nation—Saskatchewan. They operate through consensus, and senators are to devote time, thoughts, and study to their work. It was established to honour the central role of elder in traditional Métis communities.

When the Senate had been originally established, they had much more authority over the activities of the Métis Nation—Saskatchewan. They served as the judicial arm for the Métis Nation—Saskatchewan with the power to resolve disputes that occurred between regions and locals, they formed the Métis Elections Commission to oversee elections and by-elections of Executive and Provincial Métis Council, and they oversaw the operations of the Métis Nation—Saskatchewan from the period when the general election was called and to when candidates were elected. The authority of the Senate was removed in 2008.

=== General Assembly ===
The General Assembly is the political forum for Métis citizens in Saskatchewan. The General Assembly meets annually, and provides a forum where Métis citizens receive information from their government, review documents and provide guidance to the Métis Nation Legislative Assembly, and where they discuss, amend, and vote on ratification of amendments to the Constitution of the Métis Nation—Saskatchewan.

=== Métis Nation—Saskatchewan Secretariat Inc. ===
The Métis Nation—Saskatchewan Secretariat Inc. serves as the administrative body for the Métis Nation—Saskatchewan, through which the policies and programs directed by the Métis Nation—Saskatchewan are administered and carried out. This is because the Métis Nation—Saskatchewan is recognized as the government democratically elected by the Métis citizens of Saskatchewan to advance their Aboriginal rights, including self-government and self-determination, but the Métis Nation—Saskatchewan has to operate through non-profit structures until formally recognized and legislated as a third order of government. The Government of Saskatchewan enacted The Métis Act (Chapter M-14.01 of the Statutes of Saskatchewan, 2001) to promote and strengthen Métis governance of their institutions and communities through partnership between the Government of Canada, Government of Saskatchewan, and Métis Nation—Saskatchewan, and established Métis Nation—Saskatchewan Secretariat Inc. pursuant to The Métis Act.

=== Affiliates ===
Métis Nation—Saskatchewan has established several affiliates that support the needs of Métis citizens in Saskatchewan. These affiliates include:

- Back to Batoche;
- Clarence Campeau Development Fund;
- Gabriel Dumont Institute;
- Métis Addictions Council of Saskatchewan (MACSI);
- Provincial Métis Housing Corporation (PMHC); and
- SaskMétis Economic Development Corporation (SMEDCO).

The Métis Nation Legislative Assembly, on behalf of the Métis Nation—Saskatchewan, exercises all voting rights, power, and duties of ownership of the affiliates, in accordance with the recommendations provided by the Provincial Métis Council. The member of the Métis Nation Legislative Assembly with the portfolio responsible for the affiliate sits as the chairperson of that affiliate. However, under non-profit legislation, the affiliates are independent to the Métis Nation—Saskatchewan.

Métis Nation—Saskatchewan was a founding member of the Métis National Council (MNC), a representative body of Métis governments in multiple provinces. In September 2024, MN—S left the Council, primarily due to conflicts with the MNC's continued admittance of the Métis Nation of Ontario.

== Citizenship in the Métis Nation ==
In 2000, Métis Nation—Saskatchewan formally adopted the National Definition of Métis:

1. Definition (amended January 2004)
1. Métis means a person, who self identifies as Métis, is distinct from other Aboriginal peoples, is of historic Métis Nation Ancestry and is accepted by the Métis Nation.
2. "Historic Métis Nation" means the Aboriginal people then known as Métis or Half-breeds who resided in the Historic Métis Nation Homeland.
3. "Historic Métis Nation Homeland" means the area of west central North America used and occupied as the traditional territory of the Métis or Half-breeds as they were known.
4. "Métis Nation"means the Aboriginal people descended from the Historic Métis Nation which is now composed of all Métis Nation citizens and is one of the "aboriginal" peoples of Canada within the meaning of s.35 of the Constitution Act 1982.
5. "Distinct from other Aboriginal peoples" means distinct for culture and nationhood purposes.

To ensure that the citizenship review process was in accordance with this definition, the Métis Nation—Saskatchewan ratified the Métis Nation of Saskatchewan Citizenship Act, which outlines the establishment of the Métis Nation—Saskatchewan Registry, appointment of the Registrar, the process of citizenship registration, and other matters relevant to operation of the Registry.

== See also ==
- Politics of Saskatchewan
