= Audrey Poitras =

Canadian politician

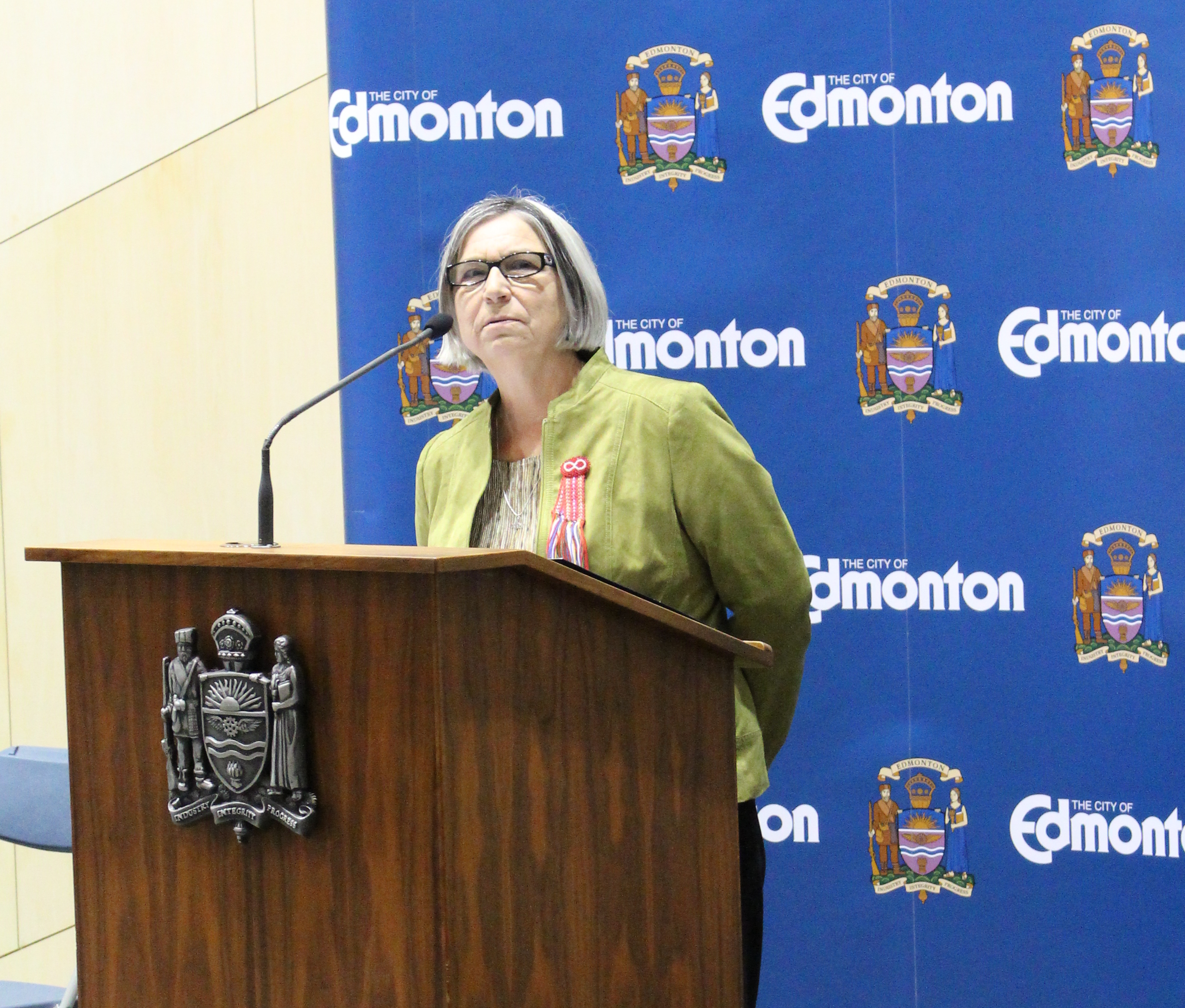
- Born: Audrey Mae Dumont; 1950 (age 75–76)
- Occupation: Politician
- Known for: longest-serving President of the Métis Nation of Alberta

Audrey Mae Poitras (née Audrey Mae Dumont; born 1950) is a Canadian politician who served as president of the Métis Nation of Alberta from 1996 to 2023. Poitras is the first female to serve as president. She also serves as vice-president on the Canadian Métis National Council and joined the Board of the Canadian Executive Service Organization in 2004.

The daughter of Jean Baptiste Dumont and Mabel Kinchshe, Poitras shares common ancestry with Gabriel Dumont, and has family ties to the Fishing Lake Métis Settlement. She grew up on a farm near Elk Point, Alberta, 150 kilometres northeast of Edmonton. She currently lives in Edmonton, Alberta.

== Career ==
As the president of the Métis Nation of Alberta (MNA), Audrey Poitras is one of the highest profile Métis women in Canada and has been an advocate for Métis rights. Elected as the first female President in 1996, she has since become the longest-serving President of the MNA.

Poitras has been an advocate for Métis rights and will continue to move the Métis rights agenda forward with the help of the Daniels Supreme Court decision in 2016.

Poitras successfully negotiated partnerships with colleges and universities, for Métis Endowment funds of $22 million. She also oversaw the creation of the MNA's Rupertsland Institute and the Métis Centre of Excellence, which is a partnership with the University of Alberta promoting education, training, and research.

In September 2003, as Interim President of the Métis National Council, Poitras announced to the world, "We won! We won!" when the Supreme Court of Canada made its historic ruling in R v Powley, a landmark case that affirms Métis as Aboriginal people with rights protected by the Constitution. One year later, in 2004, Poitras completed negotiations and signed the historic Interim Métis Harvesting Agreement with Alberta, which is the first agreement in the country to deliver harvesting rights to Métis.

In April 2004, Poitras represented the Métis Nation at the historic Canada Aboriginal Peoples Roundtable attended by more than 20 federal cabinet ministers and 70 Aboriginal leaders from across the country. Sitting alongside the Prime Minister and other national Aboriginal leaders, Poitras affirmed the Métis Nation's commitment towards a Canada-Métis Nation Framework Agreement. Poitras witnessed the signing of the Framework Agreement on 31 May 2005 during the federal Policy Retreat on Aboriginal issues in Ottawa.

In 2005, Poitras was named among "The Alberta 100" by CBC, and "Alberta's 50 most influential people" by Alberta Venture magazine. In 2017, the Alberta Chamber of Resources selected Poitras as the 2016 Indigenous Leader of the Year. She has also received various other awards and achievement milestones throughout her career, including a National Aboriginal Achievement Award.

One of Poitras' most significant achievements was the creation of Métis Crossing, a multimillion-dollar cultural interpretive site, along the banks of the North Saskatchewan River near Smoky Lake, Alberta.

== Achievements and awards ==
- Appreciation Award, University of Alberta School of Native Studies 1998
- Region 2 Recognition Award, Metis National Council, 1999
- Native Counselling Service of Alberta, 2001
- Uniting for Children, Children's Services Ministry 2003
- Esquao Lifetime Achievement Award, Institution For Advancement of Aboriginal Women 2002
- Louis Dorion Award for Outstanding Commitment, Batoche 2002
- Politics Award, Aboriginal Role Models of Alberta 2002
- Order of the Métis Shawl, Métis Elder's Council 2003
- Queen's Golden Jubilee Medal 2003
- Hon. Degree in Management, Northern Alberta Institute of Technology 2005
- CBC's The Alberta 100 Recognition 2005
- "one of Alberta's most influential people", Alberta Venture Magazine 2005
- Circle of Honour, Institute For Advancement of Aboriginal Women 2007 (highest honour given for work to improve lives of Aboriginal people)
- Recognition Award, Aboriginal Veterans Society of Alberta 2009
- National Aboriginal Achievement Award for Women in Politics 2011
- Alberta Chamber of Resources Indigenous Leader of the Year Award 2016
- Region 3 Recognition Award 2018
