= Métis National Council =

Canadian representative body

- Métis National Council logo
- Abbreviation: MNC
- Formation: March 8, 1983; 43 years ago
- Founded at: Regina, Saskatchewan, Canada
- Purpose: Representative of the Métis people within Canada.
- Headquarters: 600-180 Elgin Street; Ottawa, Ontario, K2P 2K3
- Region served: Canada
- President: Victoria Pruden
- Affiliations: Métis Nation of Ontario; Métis Nation of Alberta
- Website: www.metisnation.ca

The Métis National Council (French: Ralliement national des Métis) is a representative body of the Métis people of northwestern Canada. The MNC represented the Métis Nation both nationally and internationally, receiving direction from the elected leadership of the Métis Nation's provincial-level governments. The goal of the MNC is to "secure a healthy space for the Métis Nation's on-going existence within the Canadian federation".

Since the late-2010s, the MNC has faced disputes over fundamentals as who is considered Métis, and which organizations should have the democratic mandate to speak for the Métis Nation to Canada's federal and provincial governments. Two of its founding members, the Manitoba Metis Federation (MMF) and Métis Nation–Saskatchewan (MN–S), withdrew from the Council in 2021 and 2024, respectively, with both citing the MNC's continued recognition of the Métis Nation of Ontario, which has been accused of recognising communities with insufficient ancestral and cultural ties to the traditional Métis homeland.

== History ==
The National Council was formed in 1983 to support the recognition of the Métis as a distinct ethnicity who identify separately from other aboriginal groups, share Métis Nation ancestry (e.g. the Northwest and Red River, Manitoba settlements) and form recognized communities. This Council was formed to advocate at the federal level in Canada, which became particularly important with Section 35 of the Constitution Act, 1982. It is a recognized voice of the Métis people in three Canadian provinces to the Government of Canada, and represents these Métis people on the international stage. The National Council is governed by a Board of Governors made up of the presidents of the provincial Métis organizations and the national president. A former national president of the Council is Yvon Dumont, who went on to become the Lieutenant Governor of Manitoba. The most recent president of the Métis National Council was Cassidy Caron, whose term ended on October 1, 2024; the Council has yet to elect a replacement.

Indigenous Affairs Canada, the relevant federal ministry, deals with the MNC; on April 13, 2017 the two parties signed the Canada–Métis Nation Accord, with the goal of working with the Métis Nation, as represented by the Métis National Council on a "nation-to-nation" basis.

=== Disputes between provincial Metis organizations ===
==== Definitions of who is Metis ====
One source of recent tension between provincial organizations is a disagreement over who is considered Métis. In particular, the Métis Nation of Ontario (MNO) has granted memberships to people from four disputed communities—Mattawa, Georgian Bay, Killarney, and Temiskaming, claiming these groups consist of Métis people, and not simply regions inhabited by First Nations individuals and some settlers, but without cultural ties to the recognized Métis communities. It was alleged that 90% of the Métis who have registered with the MNO did not fulfill the requirements of citizenship put in place by the National Council in 2002, notably the requirement for an ancestral link to the Métis homelands and the Red River area specifically. The MNO disputes these claims. The Council placed the MNO on a one-year probation in 2018, and suspended its membership in 2020.

During its annual general meeting in 2019, the Manitoba Metis Federation (MMF) adopted a resolution condemning the MNO for recognizing Métis communities outside of what it considered the traditional Métis homeland (Alberta, Saskatchewan, Manitoba, parts of north-eastern British Columbia, the southern Northwest Territories, and northern halves of the U.S. states of Montana, North Dakota, and a portion of Minnesota), and advocating a withdrawal from the Council if it fails to uphold its citizenship requirements. The resolution stated that these actions "have endangered our Métis Nation's identity including our political, social, and economic integrity and the future of our Nation's existence". In September 2021, the MMF withdrew from the Council; president David Chartrand stated that the MNC had "abandoned the MMF and the true Métis Nation", and that the MMF had resolved to withdraw from the Council "should MNO continue to be allowed a seat at the governance table while they—by their own admission–have nearly 80% non-Métis Nation Citizens in their registry." The MNC has stated that they reject the idea of new Ontario Métis communities.

In 2023, Minister of Crown–Indigenous Relations Marc Miller tabled Bill C-53, a federal bill that would establish a framework to "advance the recognition of the right to self-determination" by the MNA, Métis Nation–Saskatchewan (MN–S), and MNO, and "provide a framework for the implementation of treaties". The bill has faced opposition from the MMF and First Nations communities in Ontario for its recognition of the MNO. MN–S initially supported the bill, but withdrew its support in April 2024, with president Glen McCallum criticizing the bill's "one size fits all" approach. It would then introduce its own self-government treaty.

On September 19, 2024, Métis Nation—Saskatchewan passed a resolution to withdraw from the MNC, with McCallum citing that "our MN–S government and our Métis communities need to have control over our identity and culture while making decisions that align with the values of our Saskatchewan Métis Nation", and MN–S issuing a statement that it was "determined it is in the strongest position to independently advocate for Métis citizens in Saskatchewan with all other governments". The issue with the MNO was also raised. Chartrand told CBC News that MN–S's withdrawal from the MNC effectively makes the organisation defunct, as its bylaws require that meetings be attended by representatives of two of the founding members (of which only Alberta is left). Prior to the withdrawal, the MNC had already cancelled a planned presidential election that was to be held in Saskatoon on September 26 (with the MNC having been run without a president since), and had delayed its next annual general meeting to November pending the completion of a report on the Ontario issue.

On October 31, 2024, the AGM was delayed again after Métis Nation British Columbia (MNBC) withdrew over an imbalance in the organisation's governance; president Walter Mineault stated that "with Métis Nation–Saskatchewan no longer a governing member, the governance structure that remains is inequitable", and that "there is an unwillingness to create a new way forward together". On November 30, 2024, the MNBC voted to withdraw from the MNC altogether.

=== Agreements between the federal government and provincial organizations ===
The Métis Nation of Alberta, Métis Nation – Saskatchewan, and Métis Nation of Ontario signed self-government agreements with the government of Canada in 2017 or 2018, whereas the Manitoba Métis Federation and Métis Nation British Columbia did not. The three provincial organizations formed a "tri-council" and asked that the federal government deal directly with them and not with the MNC and met with Indigenous Relations Minister Carolyn Bennet in January 2020.

=== Interim president and lack of board meetings ===
In November 2019 MNC's president, Clément Chartier, announced he would reduce his duties and allow MMF president David Chartrand to become the "national spokesperson" for MNC until a new president could be elected in April. However, Chartrand was never officially made interim president, and no board meeting was convened to sanction the change. Ultimately, the general assembly scheduled for April was cancelled due to COVID-19, so the situation was not resolved.

=== Fort McKay Métis and the creation of the Alberta Métis Federation ===
In 2019 the Fort McKay Métis Community Association (whose membership was largely the same as the region's Métis Nation of Alberta "local") voted to secede from the Métis Nation of Alberta. This prompted other community associations in Alberta to likewise secede. The separatist bodies then united in 2021 under a loose umbrella group called the Alberta Métis Federation. This group was recognized by the Manitoba Métis Federation despite protests from the Métis Nation of Alberta.

== Current structure ==
The MNC is composed of several provincial Métis organizations, the number of which has varied over time. Its current members include:

- Métis Nation of Alberta
- Métis Nation of Ontario

In 2013, members of the MNC included:

- Métis Nation of Alberta
- Métis Nation of Ontario
- Manitoba Métis Federation
- Métis Nation Saskatchewan
- Métis Nation British Columbia

=== Presidents ===
- Yvon Dumont (1988–1993)
- Gerald Morin (1993–2003)
- Audrey Poitras (January 12, 2003 interim President and National spokesperson),
- Clément Chartier (2003–2021)
- Cassidy Caron (2021–2024)
- Victoria Pruden (2024–present)
