= David Chartrand =

Canadian Metis politician (born 1960)

David Chartrand OM
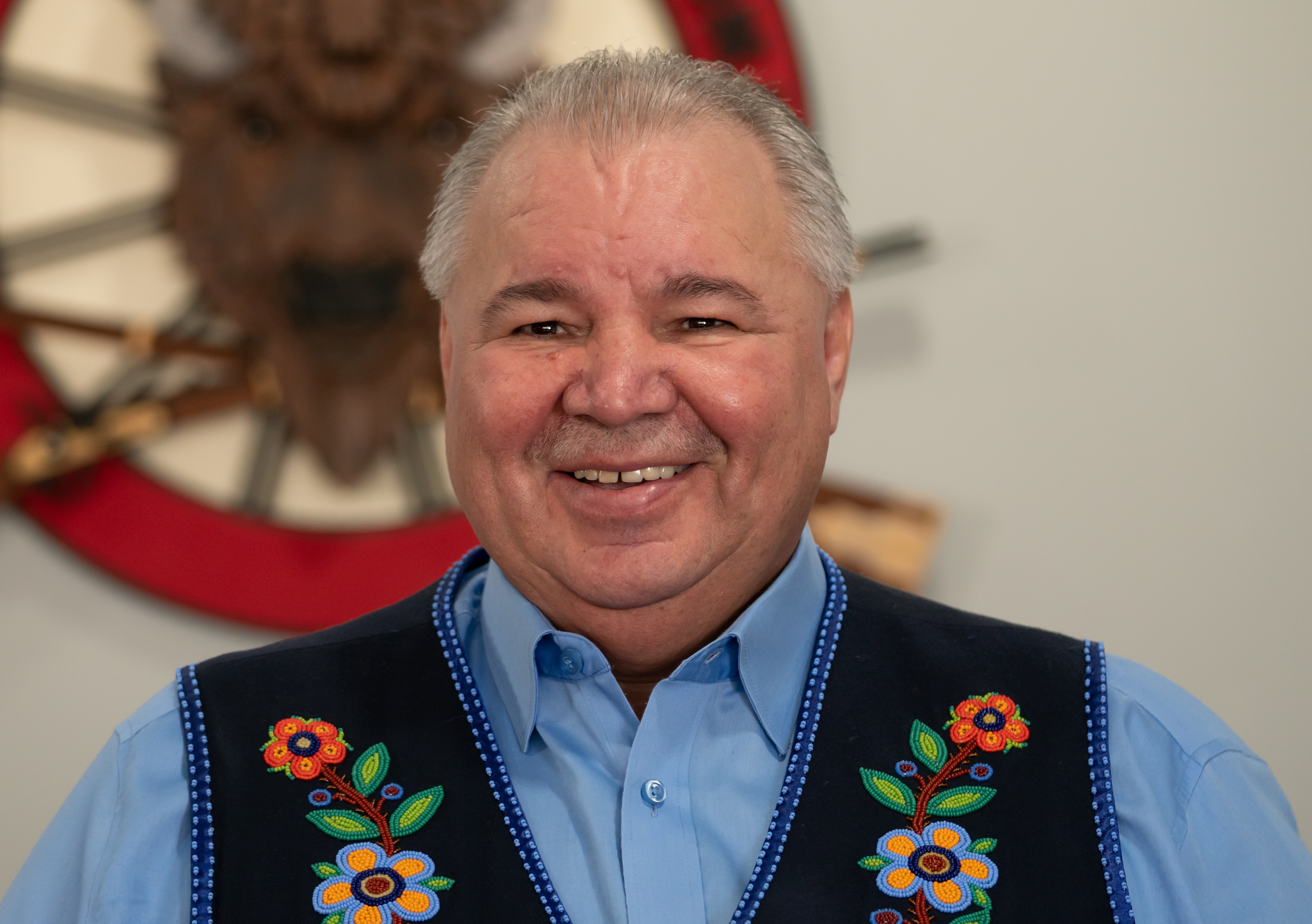
- Chartrand in 2021

President of the Manitoba Métis Federation
- Incumbent
- Assumed office 1997

Personal details
- Born: David N. Chartrand; January 23, 1960 (age 66) Duck Bay, Manitoba, Canada
- Spouse: Glorian Yakiwchuk
- Occupation: Politician; activist

David N. Chartrand OM (born January 23, 1960) is a Canadian Métis politician and activist. He is the president of the Manitoba Métis Federation (MMF), a position he took in 1997 and has held ever since.

== Early life ==
Chartrand was born in Duck Bay, Manitoba on January 23, 1960, to Martha Chartrand. He is the fourth of eight children, and was raised in a Saulteaux-speaking household, where he learned about the Red River Métis culture and traditions.

== Career ==
After moving to Winnipeg in 1982, Chartrand began working with youth and later served as the manager of The Manor Hotel from 1982 to 1985. From 1986 to 1990, he worked as a probation officer with the Department of Justice for the province of Manitoba.

=== Early political career ===
Chartrand was first elected to the Manitoba Métis Federation Board of Directors in 1988, representing the Winnipeg Region, and was re-elected four times.

From 1990 to 1997, he was the Executive Director of the Aboriginal Court Workers' Program for the Department of Justice.

He has held various volunteer positions, including Vice President of the Indian and Métis Friendship Centre of Winnipeg, President of the Manitoba Association of Friendship Centres, and President of the National Association of Friendship Centres. He was also a founding director and president of Beat the Street, an adult literacy program in Winnipeg.

He was a board member of the Northern Justice Society at Simon Fraser University and was a director for the Manitoba Métis Federation for ten years before becoming its president in 1997. He also served as a member of the Premier's Economic Advisor Committee for the Province of Manitoba.

=== President of the Manitoba Métis Federation ===
In 1999, Chartrand initiated the Métis Human Resource Development Agreement program, which provided employment and training to Métis people.

Chartrand initiated an Executive Policy Committee to support the Federation's governance structure, policies, and procedures. He helped establish a group pension plan for Federation employees while leading Constitutional reform, including adaptation of the National Métis Definition, which initiated membership reform within the Federation in 2002.

Initiatives during his presidency have included the establishment in 1999 of a Red River Métis–specific post-secondary scholarship and bursary endowment fund by the Manitoba Métis Federation. Through the Louis Riel Institute and the Post-Secondary Education Program, the Manitoba Métis Federation has provided funding to Red River Métis university and college students. The fund is valued at over $24 million.

In 2003, Chartrand led negotiations for the devolution of Métis Child and Family Services, leading to the development and implementation of mandated agencies throughout the province.

The first Red River Métis-owned and operated pharmacy, MEDOCare, opened during his tenure on December 8, 2012.

In 2014, healthcare support was expanded through a program offering prescription glasses for Red River Métis Elders. In 2016, the Manitoba Métis Federation Prescription Drug Program was launched, with the Manitoba Métis Federation covering the cost of prescription drugs for all Red River Métis Elders in Manitoba.

In 1997, Chartrand began advocating for the recognition of Red River Métis veterans. This resulted in the 2019 Métis Veterans' Agreement, which included a $30-million settlement and a formal apology from the federal government to Métis veterans and their families.

Chartrand established the "Métis Hour x 2", a radio broadcast reaching across Manitoba, addressing Red River Métis issues, policies, and events, and includes a weekly report from the Office of the President. Chartrand also established "Le Métis", a two-page, full-color insert in the Grassroots News Aboriginal newspaper, with a distribution of approximately 40,000 throughout Manitoba.

In September 2021, following a 2019 mandate from citizens at an Annual General Assembly, Chartrand led the Manitoba Métis Federation to withdraw from the Métis National Council, citing concerns that the Council was allowing the accepted definition of Métis to be distorted by member organizations.

In 2022, the Métis National Council filed a lawsuit against its former president and the Manitoba Métis Federation, alleging financial irregularities and questionable contracts. The lawsuit claims Chartrand and other executives made deals for their own personal financial benefit; the National Council sought $15 million in damages. However, a 2025 court ruling dismissed all claims by the plaintiffs.

In June 2023, under Chartrand's leadership, the National Government of the Red River Métis held an Extraordinary General Assembly where citizens voted in favor of a Red River Métis Self-Government Recognition and Implementation Treaty with Canada. According to reports, an estimated 4,000 citizens gathered to vote following negotiations that began in 2016 and three months of consultation.

After the 2025 Canadian Election and the passing of Bill C-5, Chartrand voiced concerns over the lack of indigenous consultation for the projects being funded by the bill. Follow-up efforts by the Federal Government to engage in consultations regarding Bill C-5 were boycotted by the MMF due to the inclusion of the Métis Nation of Ontario, which the MMF does not consider a legitimate organization. Despite these issues, the MMF and Chartrand didn't withdraw their support for the legislation.

=== Legal contributions to the recognition of Métis rights ===
One of his early acts upon election was the reinstatement of the Red River Métis Land Claims case. The Manitoba Métis Federation won the 2013 Supreme Court decision in Manitoba Métis Federation (MMF) v. Canada. The Supreme Court of Canada recognized that the claim of the Manitoba Métis Community was "Not a series of claims for individual relief" but a "collective claim for declaratory relief for the purposes of reconciliation between the descendants of the Métis people of the Red River Valley and Canada" and granted the MMF standing, concluding "This collective claim merits allowing the body representing the collective Métis interest to come before the court".

The decision further held that "The unfinished business of reconciliation of the Métis people with Canadian sovereignty is a matter of national and constitutional import" and issued a declaration "That the federal Crown failed to implement the land grant provision set out in section 31 of the Manitoba Act, 1870, in accordance with the honour of the Crown".

This decision related to subsequent Supreme Court decisions, such as the 2016 Daniels case that recognized the Métis Nation as section rights holders under the Canadian Constitution. On May 27, 2016, the Manitoba Métis Federation and the Government of Canada signed a Memorandum of Understanding on Advancing Reconciliation to foster engagement in an exploratory discussion process to develop a mutually agreeable Framework Agreement.

In 2021, the Manitoba Métis Federation and the Government of Canada signed a Negotiators Agreement to advance reconciliation consistent with section 35 of the Constitution Act, 1982.

On July 6, 2021, Chartrand represented the Manitoba Métis Federation in signing the Manitoba Métis Self-Government Recognition and Implementation Agreement with Canada, which recognizes the Manitoba Métis Federation as the national government of the Red River Métis. This agreement is the first Métis self-government agreement, intended to pave the way for a modern-day treaty for the Red River Métis.

On November 30, 2024, Chartrand signed the Red River Métis Self-Government Recognition and Implementation Treaty with the Government of Canada.

== Personal life ==
Chartrand is married to Glorian Yakiwchuk, a Red River Métis businesswoman from Cranberry Portage, Manitoba. They reside in Winnipeg, Manitoba and are raising their granddaughter.

Chartrand was raised in a Roman Catholic household.

== Honours and awards ==
Chartrand has received the Golden Eagle Award from the Indigenous Women's Collective and the Eagle Feather from the Friendship Centres of Ontario. His picture has been placed on the Honour Wall of Fame at the Indian and Métis Friendship Centre of Winnipeg.

In 2002, Chartrand was a recipient of the Queen Elizabeth II Golden Jubilee Medal, created to commemorate the 50th anniversary of Queen Elizabeth II's ascension to the throne.

In 2004, he received The Manitoba Order of the Sash by resolution of the Métis Nation at the 36th Annual General Assembly of the Manitoba Metis Federation.

In 2012, he received an Honorary Doctor of Laws degree from the University of Winnipeg and Queen Elizabeth II's Diamond Jubilee Medal.

In 2013, he was invested into the Order of Manitoba and received the Order of the Métis Nation at the Métis National Council Annual General Assembly.

In 2017, he received the Sovereign's Medal for Volunteers.

In 2022, he became the first Indigenous recipient of the Lifetime Achievement Award from the India Canada Cultural and Heritage Association. That same year, Chartrand received the Lanza Llanera Order of Democracy from the Republic of Colombia’s Assembly of the Meta Department.

In June 2023, he received the Queen Elizabeth II Platinum Jubilee Medal at an Extraordinary General Assembly held to ratify the Red River Métis treaty with Canada.

On February 20, 2025, Chartrand received the King Charles III Coronation Medal from Governor General Mary Simon for leadership and for providing educational and health care opportunities for the Red River Métis.
