= Métis Nation of Ontario =

Organization representing Métis in Ontario

- Abbreviation: MNO
- Formation: October 2, 1993; 33 years ago
- Type: Nonprofit
- Purpose: Representing Métis people residing in Ontario
- Headquarters: Suite 1100 – 66 Slater Street; Ottawa, Ontario, K1P 5H1
- Region served: Ontario
- Members: 33,000 (2025)
- President: Margaret Froh
- Affiliations: Métis National Council
- Website: metisnation.org

The Métis Nation of Ontario (MNO) is the government of Métis citizens and communities within Ontario that is recognized by the Canadian government. It is the democratic representative of the Métis communities represented by the MNO, with the responsibility of providing responsible and accountable self-government for its citizens and Métis communities in Ontario.

The Métis communities represented by the MNO constitute one of the Métis collectives that collectively comprise the Métis Nation, an Indigenous People that emerged with its own distinct identity, language, culture, institutions, and way of life in the Historic Métis Nation Homeland prior to Canada's westward expansion into the historic North-West.. However, the recognition and definition of Métis communities in Ontario is the subject of ongoing scholarly and political debate, with some Indigenous governments and researchers disputing the existence of distinct, rights-bearing Métis communities in certain regions of the province.

== History of Métis People and Communities in Ontario ==
Métis populations have existed in Ontario since the late 1700s. The two major fur trading companies, the Hudson's Bay Company and the North West Company, both banned employees from having relationships with Indigenous women, but that did not stop some of the men from doing so. While many Métis were of French descent, according to Campbell, there was a significant Anglo-Métis population around the Great Lakes and James Bay areas, who were the result of marriages à la façon du pays between Indigenous women and English or Scottish fur traders and British soldiers. Peterson writes that there were Métis populations that started to live around forts run by these companies, particularly around places such as Sault Ste. Marie, near the present U.S.-Canada border, and along James Bay in communities that today are known as Moosonee and Moose Factory.

Andersen, Chartrand and Reimer posit that the Métis community in Manitoba could possibly be descended from this group. Many of these Métis were forced to practice their traditions in private while publicly assimilating into white Canadian society with varying degrees of success. However, growing prejudice from incoming settlers made that a challenging route as well. Jennifer Hayter adds: "With increased immigration to Canada, reserves became in many cases the only safe enclaves for Indigenous peoples to practice their traditions and way of life. This is one reason most Canadians today are unaware that there are Métis in the Great Lakes region." Despite all of this, the Métis survived and small but growing communities still thrive in the Great Lakes. The landmark R v. Powley case of 2003 brought this situation to national attention when the judge ruled that the Métis community had become 'invisible' but was not destroyed."

While some have raised concerns about increased self-identification by individuals without verifiable Métis ancestry — sometimes referred to as settler self-indigenization - this does not diminish the existence or rights of the historic Métis Nation communities in Ontario. The Métis Nation of Ontario maintains its citizenship registry through rigorous ancestry verification and cultural criteria to ensure it reflects legitimate Métis heritage and community membership. The 2023 removal of approximately 5,400 members lacking verifiable Métis ancestry underscores these efforts to preserve accuracy.

In 2003, the Supreme Court of Canada's decision in R v Powley established a framework for Métis individuals seeking to exercise their section 35 rights. This decision affirms a definition of Métis consistent with ethnogenesis and requires a demonstrable connection to a contemporary Métis community. While historic Métis communities developed along the fur trade routes, today many vibrant Métis communities exist across the Prairies, parts of the Northwest Territories, Ontario and British Columbia that are legally recognized and affirmed.

== History of the MNO ==
=== R. v. Powley (2003) ===
The Métis Nation of Ontario was formed in 1993, along with associations in other provinces and territories, to provide a political platform for Métis in Ontario. This was first tested in 2003 in the R v Powley (2003) Supreme Court of Canada ruling that recognized the Métis as Indigenous people with rights to hunt and fish in accordance with their traditional lifestyles and developed a test of Métis identity now known as the "Powley test". Prior to this Powley ruling, and following years of extensive consultations, discussions, and debates, the Governing Members of the Métis National Council (MNC), including the Métis Nation of Ontario (MNO), unanimously adopted the National Definition for Citizenship within the Métis Nation at the MNC General Assembly (AGA) in September 2002. The definition states that "Métis" means a person who self-identifies as Métis, is of historic Métis Nation ancestry, is distinct from other Aboriginal Peoples, and is accepted by the Métis Nation. The Powley ruling aligns with this national definition adopted by the MNC.

This case involved two members of the Sault Ste. Marie Métis community facing hunting violation charges under the Ontario Game and Fish Act. In Powley, the Court clarified that Section 35 recognizes that the Métis are a "distinctive rights-bearing peoples whose own integral practices are entitled to constitutional protection under s. 35(1)" and reflecting the Métis peoples post-contact ethnogenesis, the Court rejected the argument that Métis rights must find their origins in pre-contact practices of the Métis peoples' First Nations ancestors.

The Court was also clear that "[t]he term 'Métis' in s. 35 does not encompass all individuals with mixed Indian and European heritage; rather, it refers to distinctive peoples who, in addition to their mixed ancestry, developed their own customs, way of life, and recognizable group identity separate from their Indian or Inuit and European forebears."

Building on this, the Court also outlined criteria to identify Métis persons for the purpose of claiming Section 35 Métis rights. In a historic win for the Powleys, Métis Nation of Ontario, and the Métis people more broadly, the Supreme Court not only cleared the Powleys but also established a landmark legal precedent, affirmed the historic and contemporary existence of the Sault Ste. Marie Métis community, and established the framework for identifying Métis communities in other areas of the province as well as other parts of Canada.

=== Current MNO citizenship ===
To this day, distinctive Métis communities endure in the Upper Great Lakes region and in other parts of Ontario. In 2017, the province of Ontario, after historical research and negotiations with the Métis Nation of Ontario, officially recognized six additional historical Métis communities in the province that meet the evidentiary criteria set forth in the 2003 Powley decision, in addition to the long-established Métis community at Sault Ste. Marie.

These historical and contemporary communities remain interconnected, not only by physical waterways but also through intricate kinship networks that unite Métis families across their ancestral homelands. In pursuit of verification, the Métis Nation of Ontario scrutinized primary documents, identifying objectively verifiable Métis "root ancestors" and their descendants, who constituted the rights-bearing historical Métis communities in Ontario.

=== Membership controversy ===
At the 2018 Annual General Meeting of the Métis National Council (MNC), National Council vice-president David Chartrand expressed concerns about how the MNO defines people as Métis. The National Council raised concerns about the criteria used by the MNO for defining citizenship, particularly regarding ancestral links to recognized Métis homelands; however, the existence of distinct, rights-bearing Métis communities in Ontario has since been supported by a significant independent review, which found that these communities meet the National Definition established by the Métis National Council and are an integral part of the Métis Nation and its Homeland, as demonstrated through evidence of ancestry, political action, cultural distinctiveness and ties to land and waters – the foundational "Threads of the Sash" framework used by the Expert Panel.

In September 2021, the Manitoba Métis Federation left the MNC, citing the continued membership of the MNO and the lack of action of the MNC as the main reason for its departure.

In 2023, members of the MNO voted to remove 5,400 members who lacked verifiable connections to Métis ancestry from its registry.. Scholarly and political disagreements over Métis identity and recognition in Ontario have been ongoing and involve multiple Indigenous governments and organizations.

== Structure ==
The MNO governance structure is set up in a style similar to a democratically elected, provincial government. The Community Councils serve as the main connection point between MNO citizens and the provincial leadership. Assistance and resources are provided by the MNO to the Community Councils to carry out their mandates and make sure they are managed well. Each Community Council also has a seat for a Youth representative that works with the Métis Nation of Ontario Youth Council and stands for Métis youth in the region.

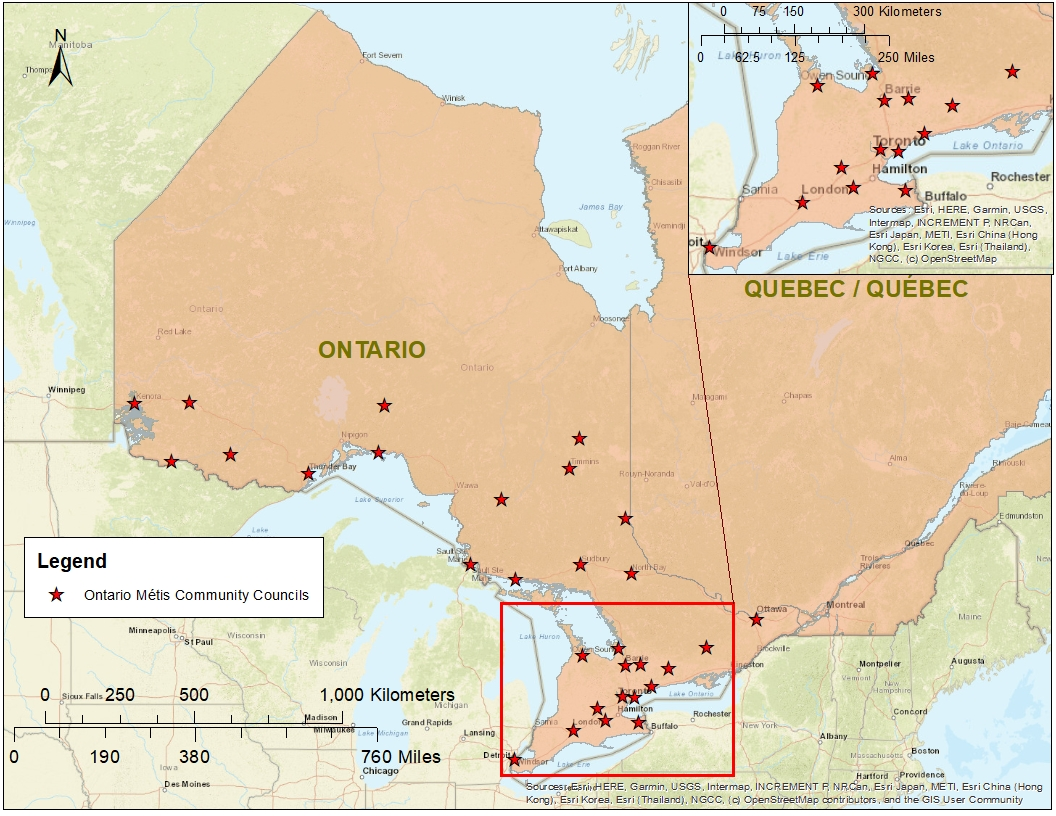
Map of the community councils managed by the Métis Nation of Ontario

The provincial leadership takes the form of the Provisional Council of the Métis Nation of Ontario (PCMNO), which is accountable to MNO citizens at their Annual General Assemblies. It deals with issues and decisions that affect the Métis as a whole throughout Ontario. The PCMNO has an executive section with five members, nine councilors for the different regions of Ontario, representatives for the youth and university-age segments of the populations, and four senators. The current president is Margaret Froh, who is the first female president of the MNO. A lawyer by training, she has previously worked in Indigenous law and administration and policy at the MNO. Froh, who identifies as Two-Spirit and LGBTQIA+, has been a champion for the importance of visibility and representation for Two-Spirit and LGBTQIA+ people within Indigenous communities and beyond.

== Self-government ==
In February 2023, a significant milestone was reached as Canada and the MNO came together to sign a Métis Self-Government Recognition and Implementation Agreement. It builds upon foundations laid on June 27, 2019, when the MNO and the Government of Canada (Canada) signed the MNO-Canada Métis Government Recognition and Self-Government Agreement (the "Self-Government Agreement"), and the formal negotiations initiated in 2017.

The 2019 Self-Government Agreement recognized the MNO's self-governance rights and outlined a clear path for the transition of existing governance structures into a federally recognized Métis Government. Canada had also committed to passing implementation legislation at that time.

This legislation formally acknowledges certain Métis governments' ability to exercise inherent rights including the right to self-government and self-determination. This Self-Government Agreement and legislation solely pertain to Métis people and do not impact First Nations, Inuit, or any other Canadians.
