= Manitoba Métis Federation =

- Métis government
- Establishment of Manitoba Metis Federation, Inc.: 1967; 59 years ago
- Signing and ratification of Manitoba Métis Self-Government Recognition and Implementation Agreement: 6 July 2021; 5 years ago
- Government Headquarters: Winnipeg

Government
  - Type: Métis Government
  - President: David Chartrand
- Demonym: Red River Métis
- Time zone: UTC−06:00 (CST)
  - Summer (DST): UTC−05:00 (CDT)
- Area code(s): 204, 431, and 584
- Website: www.mmf.mb.ca

The Manitoba Métis Federation (MMF) is a federally recognised Métis government. Its current president is David Chartrand. As of 2023 the MMF had 47,000 Members. Since 2022, Métis living outside of Manitoba have been invited by the Manitoba Métis Federation to become citizens of the MMF.

In September 2019, the MMF began the process of leaving the Métis National Council (MNC). It said its primary reason for withdrawal was that the historic communities composing the Métis Nation of Ontario lack connection to the Red River Métis. This withdrawal from the MNC was completed in September 2021.

In 2024, the Manitoba Métis Federation became the first modern Métis government to sign a treaty with the federal government.

== History ==
In 1967, the MMF was incorporated to protect the rights and interests of Red River Métis. Its founders included George Fleury, Joseph Angus Spence, and its first president, Adam Cuthand.

In 1985, the MMF appointed a working group to study the possibility of creating an independent educational institute. In 1987, an agreement was reached with the Government of Manitoba and it was decided that the organization would be established immediately and named the Louis Riel Institute.

== Leadership ==
The first non-elected Board of Directors was composed of Adam Cuthand, Joe Keeper, and Alfred Disbrowe.

The successive presidents of the MMF have been the following:

President	From	To
Adam Cuthand	1967	1970
Angus Spence	1970	1973
Connie Eyolfson	1973	1974
Ferdinand Guiboche	1974	1975
Edward Head	1975	1976
John Morrisseau	1976	1981
Don McIvor	1981	1984
Yvon Dumont	1984	1993
Ernie Blais	1993	1994
Billyjo DeLaRonde	1994	1997
David Chartrand	1997	present

== Activities ==
During the COVID-19 pandemic, the MMF received a $460,200 grant from the Public Health Agency of Canada's Immunization Partnership Fund to increase acceptance of COVID-19 vaccines among Métis citizens in Manitoba.

The MMF runs a community based climate monitoring program. This initiative documents and helps to understand the changes in climate within its traditional territory; the MMF Weather Keepers initiative is part of this program.

The MMF, via the Louis Riel Institute, provides a variety of bursaries and awards to Métis students who are citizens of the MMF to help ease the costs of post-secondary studies.
