= Society for the Study of the Indigenous Languages of the Americas =

The Society for the Study of the Indigenous Languages of the Americas (SSILA) is an international organization founded in 1981 devoted to the study of the indigenous languages of North, Central, and South America.

SSILA has an annual winter meeting held in association with the Linguistic Society of America's annual conference. Summer meetings are held in alternate years at venues near the LSA's Summer Institute. Presentations at SSILA meetings may be made in English, Spanish, Portuguese, or an Indigenous American language.

Each year, SSILA accepts nominations for three awards, which are presented at the annual meeting. The Mary R. Haas Book Award is presented for an outstanding unpublished manuscript that makes a significant substantive contribution to our knowledge of native American languages. The Ken Hale Prize is presented in recognition of a scholar's outstanding community language work and commitment to the documentation, maintenance, promotion, and revitalization of indigenous languages in the Americas.

The third prize was established to honor SSILA's founder, Victor Golla, who served as Secretary – Treasurer through 2007. The Golla Prize is awarded to scholars who show a significant history of both linguistic scholarship and service to the scholarly community.

SSILA issues two online publications: the quarterly SSILA Newsletter and the occasional SSILA Bulletin.

== See also ==
- International Journal of American Linguistics
- Journal of Indigenous Studies
- AlterNative: An International Journal of Indigenous Peoples
- American Indian Quarterly
- Indigenous Law Centre
- Journal of Aboriginal Health
- Oceania (journal)
- Native American studies
- Center for World Indigenous Studies
