= Journal of Indigenous Studies =

- Discipline: Anthropology
- Language: English, French, Cree
- Edited by: Dana F. Lawrence (1989–1990), Catherine Littlejohn (1991), Karla Jessen Williamson (1996–1997)

Publication details
- History: 1989–1997
- Publisher: Gabriel Dumont Institute of Native Studies and Applied Research (Canada)
- Frequency: Biannual

Standard abbreviations
- ISO 4: J. Indig. Stud.

Indexing
- ISSN: 0838-4711
- OCLC no.: 19758199

The Journal of Indigenous Studies (French: La Revue des Études Indigènes) was a multilingual, biannual, peer-reviewed academic journal. It was established in 1989 and was sponsored by the Gabriel Dumont Institute, a Métis-directed educational and cultural entity in Saskatoon (Saskatchewan, Canada), affiliated with the University of Regina. The journal's scope was interdisciplinary and cross-cultural, with a focus on indigenous people, from the perspectives of a variety of academic fields, including archaeology, education, law, linguistics, philosophy, and sociology. The journal was one of several Native American newspapers and periodicals under the auspices of the Aboriginal Multimedia Society of Alberta.

While all six volumes were written in English and French, three of them (Nos. 3, 5, and 6) were also in Cree. The last volume was published in 1997.

== History ==
Dana F. Lawrence was the founding editor-in-chief.

=== 1989 ===
The first issue, Winter (January) 1989, written in English and French, circulated in Australia, Canada, the United Kingdom, and the United States. Topics included native self-government, indigenous values in a colonial education system, Indian/Métis language programs with French immersion, and death/reburial. There were also two book reviews within this issue. The second issue, Summer (July) 1989, featured articles on Aboriginal languages, Michif language, and First Nations women. There were also three book reviews within this issue.

=== 1990s ===
There were no issues printed in 1990 during a personnel turnover while Lawrence moved on to the University of British Columbia. Catherine Littlejohn, free-lance historian, researcher, author and consultant, was introduced as the new editor for the third issue, published in Winter (January) 1991. As with her predecessor, Littlejohn urged for international participation. Besides English and French, it was also written in Cree. There were articles on archaeology, health, and spirituality, as well as two book reviews.

Summer (July) 1991, the fourth issue, saw several major changes: the associated editors of previous issues were replaced by a review board entirely made up of participants from Canadian institutions, article abstracts were written in Cree syllabics, APA format was no longer required for articles written in a discipline that used another style, and citations for traditional knowledge had to be validated by the indigenous community. The issue contained articles on education, law, policy, and residential schools, as well as two book reviews within this issue. McNinch wrote the opening editorial of the Winter (January) 1992 issue, as Littlejohn had left the journal. Circulation expanded to New Zealand and included the topics of Māori language, Māori music, and a literary biography on Native American poet Paula Gunn Allen. There was one book review within this issue.

The sixth and final issue did not appear until Winter (January) 1997, and with it, another editor, Karla Jessen Williamson. The previous long list of editorial board members or assistant editors was gone, replaced by a list of manuscript evaluators. The topics of this issue included education, employment/training, native/newcomer relations. Indigenous Australians and North American Inuit were the subject populations. There were three book reviews within this issue.

== Publishing ==
The front cover was designed by Sherry Farrell Racette and, while the colours of the front cover changed for the different issues, the design never changed. Earlier issues of the journal were typeset by ABCOM Publishers and the last one was typeset by The Little Print Shop (Saskatoon). All but the last issue were printed and distributed by University of Toronto Press. The journal did not accept paid advertising.

== Scholarly references ==
The short-lived journal and individual articles were subsequently cited by other scholars. For example, White's "Forced Sterilization amongst American Indian Women" (1989) was quoted by Davies & Clow (2009), American Indian sovereignty and law, and Douglas' "Māori Language Nests" (1992) was mentioned in Abley (2005), Spoken Here: Travels Among Threatened Languages. At least one article was reprinted as a chapter in a later book: Watson's, "The affirmation of indigenous values in a colonial education system" in Stone & MacKenzie (1990), The Excluded past: Archaeology in education. Likewise, a chapter previously published elsewhere (for example, Hubert's, "A proper place for the dead: a critical review of the 'reburial' issue", chapter ten, in Layton (1994), Conflict in the archaeology of living traditions), was reprinted in the journal.

== See also ==
- American Indian Quarterly
- Indigenous Law Centre
- Journal of Aboriginal Health
- Oceania
- Native American studies
- Center for World Indigenous Studies
- Society for the Study of the Indigenous Languages of the Americas
