= Center for World Indigenous Studies =

American non-profit organization

The Center for World Indigenous Studies (CWIS) is an independent, nonprofit 501(c)(3) founded in 1979 by Rudolph C. Ryser, PhD (Oneida/Cree) and Chief George Manuel (Secwepemc). CWIS is a global community of indigenous studies activists and scholars who are committed to protecting and advancing the rights and knowledge of the world's 6,000 indigenous nations. The organization is actively involved in the management of the Chief George Manual Memorial Indigenous Library – among the largest indigenous document repositories in the world; the development and implementation of indigenous-centric public policy, consultation and conflict resolution between Indigenous peoples and states governments, education in the areas of Indigenous studies and traditional medicine, and the publishing of the peer-reviewed, Fourth World Journal. CWIS has drafted 27 laws and regulations, archived more than 100,000 indigenous documents, educated more than 3500 students and provided pro-bono medical care to more than 7000 individuals via the Center for Traditional Medicine. Ryser was Executive Director and Board Chair until his death in October 2023, after which Leslie Korn assumed the role of Board Chair and Acting Executive Director. A core staff of nine support center activities and numerous affiliated scholars are found on every continent.

== Main Areas of Focus ==
Research and Public Policy: CWIS is an international leader in the development and advancement of Indigenous-centered public policy. CWIS analysts have drafted policies focused on improving the effectiveness of Indigenous-nations governance and institutional responses to changing economic, political and cultural environments. The main areas of policy focus are governance, environment and climate, traditional medicine, education, and Indigenous intellectual and cultural property rights.

Education: CWIS is committed to the preservation and advancement of traditional Indigenous knowledge and culture. The organization offers courses in Indigenous and Fourth World Studies, Traditional Healing Arts and Sciences, Applied Indigenous Research Methods, Strategy and Governance, and Environmental Studies / Fourth World People. Courses are taught by experts in their respective fields and include many core CWIS members.

Chief George Manual Memorial Indigenous Library: Dedicated to the memory of Secwepemc Chief George Manuel (1921–1989), who worked closely with CWIS founder Dr. Rudolph Rÿser, the library was founded as a documents repository in 1979. With more than 100,000 documents from Indigenous nations around the world, the library is among the largest Indigenous peoples document repositories in the world. More than 4000 documents have been digitized and are available through their website.

Fourth World Journal: Started in 1984, the Fourth World Journal (FWJ) is a peer-reviewed journal that has grown to become one of the leading publications for ideas and analysis by, for and about Indigenous peoples around the world.

Center for Traditional Medicine: Started in 1977, the Center for Traditional Medicine (CTM) conducts original research of traditional approaches to medicine and provides clinical education, training and consultation that combines Indigenous systems of healing with complementary and integrative medicine and public health care. Calling traditional medicine the "mother" of all medicine, CTM focuses on the relationship between trauma, health, local knowledge of medicinal plants and foods, and the promotion of social justice through health care.

A major project of the CTM involves the prevention and treatment of diabetes type 2, one of the most pervasive health problems in indigenous communities worldwide. CTM's integrative approach promotes health restoration through nutrient-dense traditional foods and natural medicines combined with traditional wisdom and modern science. CTM has been working with Indigenous communities and health agencies for more than 40 years.

== History ==
Dr. Rudolph Ryser, PhD, founded the Center for World Indigenous Studies (CWIS) in 1979 after the first Conference of Tribal Governments at Tumwater in the Pacific Northwest voted to establish a documentary center for tribal records and research, and the creation of a "Fourth World Think Tank". Five years later, in 1984, CWIS incorporated into a research and education nonprofit 501(c)(3). Since its inception, CWIS has published numerous important research papers on tribal governance, traditional medicine and healthcare, Indigenous culture, environmentalism and Indigenous sovereignty. Many of these documents have been instrumental in shaping public policy on Indigenous issues from the local to international level.

Some notable events in CWIS history include:

In 1991, the Fourth World Documentation Project (FWDP) became one of the first World Wide WEB pages on the Internet and a node of the world wide web library.

In 1994, the Center for Traditional Medicine, founded by Dr. Leslie Korn in 1976, joined the CWIS.

IN 1995, after 10 years of participation in the United Nations Working group on the rights of Indigenous peoples, CWIS drafted "The International Covenant on the Rights of Indigenous Nations", which was ratified by nations worldwide.

In 1997, CWIS opened a 4-acre education retreat location in Mexico for seminar and certificate programs in Fourth World Studies and Traditional Healing Arts and Sciences leading to BA, MA and PhD. Degrees as well as expands seminar locations in the United States and Canada.

In 2003, Dr. Rÿser developed the American Indian Leadership course in at Evergreen State College and the Northwest Indian College and developed an MA course for Evergreen State College Public Administration Graduate Program entitled "Indian Policy 1607–2003: A Political Odyssey". A year later, certificate and Masters Degree programs in Traditional Healing Arts and Sciences and Fourth World Studies expanded both online and onsite courses.

In 2013, CWIS developed and signed the "Statement of 72 Indigenous Nations and Ten Indigenous Organizations" submitted to the Twelfth Session of the United Nations Permanent Forum on Indigenous Issues at the United Nations World Conference on the Rights of Indigenous Peoples.

In 2014, Intercontinental Cry magazine joined CWIS as a new publication.

In 2018, CWIS conducted an extensive inquiry into international mechanisms to prosecute acts of genocide and crimes against humanity committed against Indigenous nations from 1945 onward. Of particular focus in the study were the Uyghurs of Uyghuristan (Turkistan in western China, Rohingya in south western Burma and the Yezidi in northern Iraq.) The study was reported in a CWIS article, noting that from 1945 to 2017 an estimated 12.482 million Indigenous people were killed in 156 different incidents, concluding that a new International Mechanism on Genocide must be established.

In 2019, CWIS established relationship with First Nations Experience television network that serves PBS stations in 12 US states to develop and deliver programs on Traditional Medicine and Fourth World Geopolitics.

== Notable people ==
- Rudolph C. Ryser, Ph.D. Executive Director and Editor in Chief of the Fourth World Journal (1979–2023). Ryser grew up as member of the Cowlitz tribe, but was of Weskarini, Oneida and Cree heritage.
- Dr. Leslie Korn, Board Chair and Acting Executive Director (2023 to Present).
- Chief George Manuel (1929–1989) of the Shuswap nation.
- Joe DeLaCruz (1937–2000), former president of the National Congress of American Indians, was chair of public policy at CWIS.
- Leslie E. Korn, PhD, MPH, LMHC, Director of Research and Education, Director Center for Traditional Medicine.
- Dina Gilio-Whitaker, MA Policy Director, Senior Researcher.

== See also ==
- AlterNative: An International Journal of Indigenous Peoples
- American Indian Quarterly
- Indigenous Law Centre
- Journal of Aboriginal Health
- Journal of Indigenous Studies
- Native American studies
- Oceania (journal)
- Society for the Study of the Indigenous Languages of the Americas
