= Balnaves =

Balnaves may refer to:

== People ==
- Henry Balnaves, (1512?– 1570), Scottish politician and religious reformer
- Neil Balnaves (1944–2022), Australian media executive and arts philanthropist
- Victoria Balnaves, actress in Scottish TV series Two Doors Down

== Other uses ==
- Balnaves Chair in Constitutional Law at the Indigenous Law Centre at UNSW, Sydney, Australia
- Balnaves Fellowship, formerly Balnaves Award, at Belvoir St Theatre, Sydney, Australia
- Balnaves development project, an Australian oil field, one of many oil megaprojects (2014)
- Balnaves Foundation, an Australian philanthropic institution founded by Neil Balnaves
- Balnaves Foundation Multimedia Learning Centre at Bond University at Robina, Queensland, Australia

== See also ==
- Balnaves Contemporary Series, at the National Gallery of Australia
