= Indigenous Law Centre =

Part of the University of New South Wales Law Faculty, Sydney, Australia

Coordinates: 33°55′01″S 151°13′40″E

The Indigenous Law Centre (ILC), formerly the Aboriginal Law Research Unit and Aboriginal Law Centre, is part of the Law Faculty at the University of New South Wales. It develops and coordinates research, teaching and information services in the multi-disciplinary area of Indigenous peoples and the law, and publishes two major journals: the Australian Indigenous Law Review (formerly Australian Indigenous Law Reporter) and the Indigenous Law Bulletin (formerly Aboriginal Law Bulletin). It is the only Indigenous law research centre in Australia.

== History ==
In early 1970, when the first Aboriginal Legal Service (ALS) was established, Hal Wootten, professor of law, was its first President. He operated the ALS from the UNSW Law School in its early years. When the Whitlam government funded the ALS, staff found their time taken up with criminal representation, and had no time for law reform advocacy, so they carried on contacting the UNSW Faculty of Law members for advice on legal issues such as land rights claims, environmental law and other legal matters.

The Aboriginal Law Research Unit was established at UNSW on 23 April 1981. A small group of academics – Professor Garth Nettheim, Richard Chisholm, Pat O'Shane and Neil Rees – established a "back-up centre" or legal research centre that could assist the frontline ALS as well as and Aboriginal Land Councils. In 1986 the Aboriginal Law Research Unit became the Aboriginal Law Centre, and was later renamed Indigenous Law Centre.

The ILC has worked with the Indigenous community and has been involved in High Court cases such as Koowarta v Bjelke-Petersen (1982), Mabo v Queensland (No 2) (1992), and international indigenous rights advocacy such as the United Nations Declaration on the Rights of Indigenous Peoples (UNDRIP).

== 21st century ==
Since 2010 much work has been focussed on the development of reform of the Constitution of Australia. In recent years, the ILC has been assisting with the reforms proposed by the Uluru Statement from the Heart, in particular a First Nations Voice to Parliament enshrined in the Constitution and a Makarrata Commission to coordinate and facilitate the making of agreements and a truth-telling process.

The Balnaves Chair in Constitutional Law was established by the Balnaves Foundation in 2020, to allow Professor Megan Davis to continue the work of the Uluru Statement from the Heart. The chair was named in honour of Alexandra Balnaves, daughter of Neil Balnaves, who died in 2019. The foundation has had a long relationship with UNSW since its establishment in 2006, by 2020 having given almost A$5.5 million, which included allocations for Indigenous medical scholarships and for funding the UNSW Indigenous Law Centre. Davis a former director of the Indigenous Law Centre, and also holds the office of Pro Vice-Chancellor, Indigenous.

=== Core research areas ===
As of November 2020, the ILC focuses on six core research areas:

- Uluru Statement from the Heart
- Violence against Indigenous women and children (including sexual assault)
- Constitutional reform and Indigenous peoples of Australia
- Indigenous land reform (land tenure reform, covering land rights and native title in Australia)
- Remote Indigenous housing and home ownership
- Legal regulation of alcohol consumption in the Northern Territory
- United Nations Declaration on the Rights of Indigenous Peoples (UNDRIP)

== Publications ==
The Indigenous Legal Centre publishes two journals:

- The Australian Indigenous Law Review (1996–) was known as the Australian Indigenous Law Reporter from 1996 to 2007. It is a peer-reviewed which publishes research on legal issues which affect Indigenous peoples both in Australia and around the world.
- The Indigenous Law Bulletin (April 1981–) was formerly the Aboriginal Law Bulletin, which was issued with the Legal Service Bulletin from 1981 to 1991 and with Alternative Law Journal from 1992 to 1995, includes articles and commentary from people from diverse backgrounds on issues relating to Indigenous peoples and Australian law.

== See also ==
- Indigenous Australian customary law
- Australian Aboriginal Sovereignty
- Center for World Indigenous Studies
- Native American studies
- Society for the Study of the Indigenous Languages of the Americas

=== Journals on related topics ===
- AlterNative: An International Journal of Indigenous Peoples
- American Indian Quarterly
- Journal of Aboriginal Health
- Journal of Indigenous Studies
- Oceania
