= Belcourt (surname) =

Belcourt is a surname. Notable people with the surname include:

- Christi Belcourt (born 1966), Canadian artist
- Émile Belcourt (1926–2017), Canadian operatic tenor
- Georges-Antoine Belcourt (1803–1874), Canadian Jesuit missionary and priest
- Gordon Belcourt (1945–2013), Native American leader
- Michael Belcourt (born 1964), Canadian cyclist
- Napoléon Belcourt (1860–1932), Canadian politician, lawyer and legal scholar
- Shane Belcourt (born 1972), Canadian writer and film director
- Tim Belcourt (born 1962), Canadian curler
- Tony Belcourt (born 1943), Canadian politician and film director
