= Christi Belcourt =

Métis visual artist (born 1966)

Christi Belcourt CM
- Christi Belcourt as an Artist in Residence at the McMichael Art Gallery, Kleinburg, Ontario, 2004
- Born: 1966 (age 59–60); Scarborough, Ontario
- Occupation: Painter
- Website: christibelcourt.com

Christi Marlene Belcourt CM (born September 24, 1966) is a Canadian visual artist and author. She is best known for her acrylic paintings which depict floral patterns inspired by Métis and First Nations historical beadwork art. Belcourt's work often focuses on questions around identity, culture, place, and divisions within communities.

== Biography ==
Born in Scarborough, Ontario, Belcourt is the daughter of national Métis rights activist Tony Belcourt and Judith Pierce Martin (née Streatch). Her family's roots are connected to Manitou Saskhigan (also known as Lac Ste. Anne), Alberta. Her brother Shane Belcourt is a writer, director, musician and cinematographer known for his feature film Tkaronto, which depicts the life of urban Métis and First Nations people. Her sister Suzanne Belcourt is a graphic designer and artist living and working in southern Ontario. In 1970, her father was elected as the founding President of the Native Council of Canada (now known as the Congress of Aboriginal Peoples) and the family relocated permanently to Ottawa, Ontario from Edmonton, Alberta.

As a Métis visual artist with a deep respect for the traditions and knowledge of her people, she primarily explores and celebrates the beauty of the natural world. She is the author of three books and her artwork has been utilized as cover artwork for many publications. Belcourt's work has been featured in two documentary films: So Much Depends Upon Who Holds The Shovel (2008, Wayne Peltier) and A Life in Balance (2012, Kathy Browning).

Her artistic work has been commissioned by the Gabriel Dumont Institute (Saskatoon, 2004), the Nature Conservancy of Canada and the Centre for Traditional Knowledge & Museum of Nature (Ottawa, 2002), and is found in the permanent collections of the National Gallery of Canada, the Thunder Bay Art Gallery and the Canadian Museum of History, First People's Hall. Belcourt is a past recipient of awards from the Canada Council for the Arts, the Ontario Arts Council and the Métis Nation of Ontario.

She currently lives in Lac Ste. Anne, Alberta.

== Community activism ==
Belcourt is the project creator and lead coordinator of the Walking With Our Sisters, a crowd-sourced commemorative art installation for the missing and murdered Indigenous women of Canada and the United States. Started in 2012 this project has toured throughout communities in North America and continues to be driven by community volunteers.

In 2014, Belcourt founded the community based The Onaman Collective with Isaac Murdoch and Erin Konsmo. This project aims to preserve traditional knowledge, language, and teachings. In recent years Belcourt has become a vocal advocate for the need for a Métis land base and the power of Indigenous language restoration. The Onaman Collective has also worked to connect traditional knowledge keepers and elders with Indigenous youth. The Collective has also engaged in advocacy around water protection and raising awareness of the need to protect the Great Lakes and other bodies of water. They created a series of banners free to download on their website to use during water and land protection events. These banners are act of solidarity between water, land and animals protectors from different communities across Turtle Island.

In the same year, Belcourt was also involved in promoting the "blue dot" movement as a way of visually protesting government decisions around the First Nations Control of First Nations Education Act. The blue dots added to photographs in this movement were used as a way of identifying the marginalized people left out of the conversations by the Canadian Government.

As a form of activism in 2016, Belcourt requested the Métis Nation of Ontario remove her name from the organization's registry. Belcourt's request was in part based on her disagreement with the organization's decision to sign deals with mining companies such as Energy East and Nuclear Waste Management Organization.

Beginning in 2017, Belcourt was involved in the establishment 150 Acts of Resistance project. This initiative was designed to counter the Canadian government narrative around the "Canada 150" sesquicentennial celebration and to promote a discussion of the realities of colonialism and Indigenous resistance in Canada.

== Artwork ==
=== Painting ===
Belcourt creates large, mural-sized acrylic paintings that resemble the beadwork of her ancestors and community, by using her brush to make tiny dots that resemble beadwork. Her paintings are filled with floral designs that include insects, birds and other animals, spread out across the canvas. These are not just floral patterns or illustrations, but Belcourt has created stories for each work.

In 2014, Christi Belcourt was inspired to make an acrylic on canvas painting with measurements of 36 by 48 inches and named, Offerings and Prayers for Genebek Ziibing. According to Belcourt, "between 1955 to 1978, there were over 30 tailings dumps and spills from uranium mines at Elliot Lake into the 10 lakes and Serpent River. The radiation from uranium dumps completely killed the life in the waters and the people of Genaabaajing are still living with the devastating environmental effects today". According to a case study on Elliot Lake written in 1982, by nuclear analyst Ralph Torrie, "At Elliot Lake, Ontario, tailings were dumped into various lakes in the Serpent River watershed throughout the 1950s and 1960s". This painting was created because of the inspiration received from the stories and teachings of Isaac Murdoch, an Indigenous artist and environmentalist.

In 2025, Belcourt completed "In My Grandmother's Time", a digitized image artwork printed on vinyl. This large piece was installed at the University of Alberta, in the atrium of the newly-renovated University Commons building. After completing the piece, Belcourt noted her inspiration in a Facebook post, "I'm very grateful for the chance to make this space beautiful and to be able to honour and celebrate the land of my Metis grandmothers from Lac Ste. Anne". The artist also noted that this "huge" artwork took three years to finish.

=== Stained glass ===
In 2012, Belcourt created her work Giniigaaniimenaaning (looking ahead) as part of Canada's 2008 apology for its residential schools. Her stained glass window is in the Parliament of Canada and includes a replica of a photo taken at the Shubeacadie Indian Residential School in Nova Scotia. The work, whose Anishinaabemowin name signifies looking ahead for the unborn ones, represents through the shattered glass the breaking of the silence surrounding the residential school system of its survivors in the 1980s, the evolving stance of the Church and governments in the recognition of the harms perpetrated by the residential schools and their apology as well as the hope of reconciliation.

== Exhibitions ==
=== Solo ===
- Urban Myths: Aboriginal Artists in the City, Karsh-Masson Gallery (2000)
- Lessons from the Earth, Thunder Bay Art Gallery (2003/2004)
- New Works By Christi Belcourt, Metis Nation of Ontario Annual General Assembly (2005)
- Great Metis of My Time, Batoche National Historic Site (2008)
- Off The Map & Great Metis of My Time, Urban Shaman Gallery (2008)
- Off The Map, ArtSpace Gallery (2008)
- Identity, Land & Spirit, Red Shift Gallery (2009)
- Mapping Routes: Perspectives of Land and Water in Ontario, Thunder Bay Art Gallery (2010)
- The Power of Mother Earth - Christi Belcourt - A Retrospective with Isaac Murdoch, Thunder Bay Art Gallery, Carleton University Art Gallery, MacKenzie Art Gallery (2020)

=== Group ===
- Making the Spirit Visible, New York State University (2001)
- Métis in the 21st Century, Forest Farm Hall (2003)
- LaCloche Art Show, Whitefish Falls (2004)
- Manitoulin Artists, 4elements Gallery (2004)
- Native American Fine Arts Show, Mashantucket Pequot Museum & Research Center (2005)
- West Side Stories: The Metis of Northwestern Saskatchewan, Diefenbaker Canada Centre at University of Saskatchewan (2007)
- A Tribute to Norval Morrisseau and the Woodland Artists, Red Lake Heritage Centre (2008)
- Reflets, Reflections sur L'Eau, Maison de la Nature et l'EnvironnementAix en Provence, France (2008)
- Vanishing Seams, Indian and Inuit Art Centre (2008)
- Willisville Mountain Project (touring exhibit, 2009)
- Creation, Land, Treaty: From Sacred to Profane, Ojibway Cultural Foundation (2009)
- Mantuc, Little Spirits: The Language of Glass Beads, North America Native Museum in Zurich, Switzerland (2010)
- Good Medicine, Craft Council of Saskatchewan and the Gabriel Dumont Institute (2011)
- Resilience / Resistance: Metis Art, 1880-2011, Batoche National Historic Site (2011)
- Contrary Projects in Venice: an Aboriginal Art Intervention at the Venice Biennale (2011)
- Ancestral Teachings: Contemporary Perspectives Thunderbird Art Centre (2011)
- Faraway Nearby, Art Gallery of Algoma (2012)
- Sakahan, National Gallery of Canada (2013)
- Before and After the Horizon: Anishinaabe Artists of the Great Lakes, National Museum of The American Institute (2014)
- Material Girls, Dunlop Art Gallery, Regina, Saskatchewan (2015)
- The Aunties are Listening, Art Gallery of Grande Prairie, (2018)
- Resilience, National Billboard Project, (2018)
- With Isaac Murdoch, Uprising, Thunder Bay, Ottawa, Regina, and Winnipeg, (2018).
- Hearts of Our People: Native Women Artists, Minneapolis Institute of Art, (2019)
- Radical Stitch, MacKenzie Art Gallery (2022).
- "Spirit in the Land", Nasher Museum of Art at Duke University, (2023), and Perez Art Museum Miami, (2024).ISBN 9780938989455.

=== Permanent installations ===
- Giniigaaniimenaaning, stained glass window to recognize the survivors of Indian Residential Schools, installed in the Centre Block, Parliament of Canada (2012)
- Christi Belcourt Permanent Collection Room, Gabriel Dumont Institute (2013)

=== Other artistic works ===
- Belcourt designed the competition medals for 2015 Pan and Parapan American Games.
- In 2015 Belcourt's drawing "Water Song" was used as print inspiration for a line of clothing by Valentino.
- In 2017 Belcourt collaborated with ela Handbags to create a line of limited edition handbags with prints resembling her paintings.
- In 2021 Belcourt's painting "The Wisdom of the Universe" was used in collaboration with musical group Waxwing Trio to create the "Highway of Tears" dedication video.

== Publications ==
- Co-author. Jeremy and the Magic Ball (2008), Ontario Indian Friendship Centres
- Medicines to Help Us Traditional Metis Plant Use (2008), ISBN 978-0-920915-79-0
- Beadwork: First Peoples' Beading History and Techniques (2011), ISBN 978-1-897541-25-8
- Contributor. Dreaming in Indian: Contemporary Native American Voices (2014), ISBN 9781554516865
- Contributor. iLit Strength and Struggle: Perspectives from First Nations, Inuit, and Métis Peoples in Canada (2011), ISBN 978-0071067034

== Publications about Belcourt ==
- Christi Belcourt / curated by Nadia Kurd. Ottawa, Ontario and Fredericton, N.B.: Thunder Bay Art Gallery, Carleton University Art Gallery. MacKenzie Art Gallery and Goose Lane Editions. 2020. ISBN 9781488400216.

== Awards ==
Belcourt is the recipient of numerous awards and grants from the Canada Council for the Arts, the Ontario Arts Council, the Chalmers Family Fund and the Métis Nation of Ontario, including:

- Metis Cultural Grant Recipient, Metis Nation of Ontario (1998)
- Emerging Artist Grant, Ontario Arts Council and Canadian Council for the Arts (2000, 1999)
- First place, Mixed Media, LaCloche Art Show, Whitefish Falls, Ontario (2004)
- Aboriginal Arts Projects Grant Recipient, Ontario Arts Council (2004)
- Mid-Career Artist Grant Recipient, Ontario Arts Council (2004)
- Judges Choice Award, Works on Paper Exhibit, Espanola, Ontario (2006)
- Aboriginal People's Collaborative Exchange Program, Canada Council For The Arts (2007)
- Northern Arts Grant Recipient, Ontario Arts Council (2007)
- Aboriginal Arts Projects Grant and Aboriginal Traditional Arts Program, Ontario Arts Council and Canada Council (2009)
- Chalmers Family Fund, Ontario Arts Council (2010)
- Influential Women of Northern Ontario, Aboriginal Leadership Award (2014)
- Aboriginal Arts Award 2014 Laureate, Ontario Arts Council (2014)
- Art Gallery of Ontario People's Choice Award for "The Wisdom of the Universe" acrylic painting (2015)
- Governor General's Innovation Award (2016)
- Ontario Premier's Awards for Excellence in the Arts, Individual Artist Award (2016)
- Order of Canada (2024)
- Commemorative Stamp, Canada Post (2024)

== See also ==
- Aboriginal Canadian personalities
