= CWIS =

CWIS may refer to:

- Campus-Wide Information System, an Internet-based information system provided by an educational institution, see Lynx (web browser)#History
- Center for World Indigenous Studies, a non-profit organization that studies indigenous peoples.
- Christian Women in Science, an affiliate group of the American Scientific Affiliation (ASA)
- Close-in weapon system (actually CIWS), a naval point defense weapon system
- Cycling & Walking Investment Strategy, a UK Government Department for Transport initiative.
