= Dylan Robinson =

First Nations Canadian artist and writer

- Citizenship: Skwah First Nation and Canada
- Education: University of Sussex, Ph.D.; University of Victoria, M.A.; Simon Fraser University, B.A.
- Known for: curation, artist, author
- Website: www.dylanrobinson.ca

Dylan Robinson is a xwélmexw (Stó:lō/Skwah) artist, curator and writer. He is an associate professor at the University of British Columbia's School of Music.

His research focuses on the sensory politics of Indigenous activism and the arts, and questions how Indigenous rights and settler colonialism are embodied and spatialized in public space.

Robinson was the Canada Research Chair in Indigenous Arts and the co-chair of the Indigenous Advisory Council for the Canadian Music Centre.

== Education ==
Robinson holds a Bachelor of Arts from Simon Fraser University, a Masters of Arts from the University of Victoria and in 2009, received his PhD from the University of Sussex's Centre for Research in Opera & Music Theatre.

== Career and research interests ==
Robinson's research considers how Indigenous songs live and how they are recorded and presented in museums.

Before his appointment as associate professor in the UBC School of Music, Robinson was an assistant professor at Queen's University.

Robinson is learning Halq'eméylem, the Stó:lō people's language.

== Writing ==
His recent writings include "To All Who Should Be Concerned" for Intersections: Canadian Journal of Music (2021) and Promoting and Protecting the Arts and Expressions of Indigenous Peoples: A Compendium of Experiences and Actions, which was co-edited with Heather Igloliorte and Tony Belcourt and published by the Department of Canadian Heritage in 2021. Promoting and Protecting the Arts and Expressions of Indigenous Peoples is a publication that gathers lived experiences and views on how Indigenous artistic practices and cultural expressions can be protected and promoted in addition to articulations of experiences and difficulties when facing "misappropriation of arts, cultural expressions, and artistic practices".

Of Robinson's earlier works, Hungry Listening: Resonant Theory for Indigenous Sound Studies (2020) which explores Indigenous and settler colonial practices of listening, received the Best First Book award by the Native American and Indigenous Studies Association as well as the Best Book award from the Canadian Theatre Research and Performance Association in 2021.

In 2020, Music and Modernity among First Peoples of North America, which Robinson co-edited with Victoria Lindsay Levine, received the American Musicological Society's Ruth Solie Award and the Society for Ethnomusicology's Ellen Koskoff Prize.

== Artistic practice ==
In addition to his research on Indigenous art, Robinson's artistic practice brings together music performance, dialogic art, and installation.

In nuyamł-ił kulhulmx (singing the earth) which occurred from 2013 to 2019, a music installation encompassing text, installation, video, audio interviews, photography and erasure poetry, was co-created by Anna Höstman and Dylan Robinson, as well as Kwagiulth mezzo-soprano Marion Newman, Patrick Nickleson, people from the Bella Coola Valley, and Toronto's Continuum Ensemble. It was "an artistic response to the people, environment and spirit of the Bella Coola Valley of coastal British Columbia." Drawing from "historical and contemporary sources in four languages (Nuxalk, Norwegian, English and Japanese) to create 11 short pieces about an isolated and beautiful place." It was exhibited at the Victoria Symphony Orchestra in March 2019, the Vancouver Symphony Orchestra February in 2017 and the Continuum Contemporary Music, Wychwood Theatre in Toronto in December 2013.

== Artistic projects ==
A select list of artistic projects by Robinson.

- nuyamł-ił kulhulmx (singing the earth) (2013-19). Music Installation, by Anna Höstman & Dylan Robinson. Created with Kwagiulth mezzo-soprano Marion Newman, Patrick Nickleson, people from the Bella Coola Valley, and Toronto's Continuum Ensemble. Victoria Symphony Orchestra March 2019, Vancouver Symphony Orchestra February 2017, Continuum Contemporary Music, Wychwood Theatre, Toronto December 2013.
- Soft/SOFT (2008). Collaborative creation by Dylan Robinson (director/writer), Heather Roche (Bass Clarinet), Ben Oliver (composition), and Karen Schaller. Mandela Hall, University of Sussex.
- Never Swim Alone (2001–02). Play by Daniel McIvor. Directed by Heather Lindsay. Featuring actors Billy Marchenski, Angela Bespflug, Tricia Collins, Tyler McClendon, Dylan Robinson. Burrard Aquatic Centre "Kiddies Pool", Vancouver September 2002. SFU Theatre Burnaby, BC September 2002. Havana Theatre, Vancouver August 2001.

== Curatorial projects ==
A select list of curation projects by Robinson.

- Soundings: An Exhibition in Five Parts (2019–2025), curated by Candice Hopkins and Dylan Robinson, and featured newly commissioned scores, performances, videos, sculptures and sound by Indigenous and other artists who respond to this question. Organized by Agnes Etherington Art Centre, Queen's University, Canada. The traveling exhibition is organized by Independent Curators International (ICI).
- Decolonial Imaginings (June to October 2020), curated by Dylan Robinson and Mitch Renaud. Co-produced with the Canadian Music Centre in BC, and supported by the Canada Council for the Arts.
- Ka'tarohkwi Festival of Indigenous Arts (Winter, 2019), curated by Dylan Robinson at the Isabel Bader Centre for the Performing Arts.

== Public presentations ==
A select list of public presentations featuring Robinson.

- Continuum: A conversation on historical musics & Indigenous resurgence. Produced by Early Music Vancouver's 2021 summer artist-in-residence, Jonathon Adams, Panelists include Dylan Robinson, Marion Newman and Reneltta Arluk. Recorded June 14, 2021, published Jun 15, 2021.
- Send + Receive: A Conversation with Dylan Robinson. Presented by McNally Robinson and with Collective Broadcast Co. May 6, 2021.
- Decolonial Imaginings - Curator Introduction. Presented by of-the-now. 2021.
- Hungry Listening: A conversation between Aruna D'Souza and Dylan Robinson. Presented by Independent Curators INTL. 2021.
- Curators Talk: Candice Hopkins & Dylan Robinson. Moderated by KWAG Senior Curator Crystal Mowry. Presented by the Kitchener-Waterloo Art Gallery. July 20, 2020.

== Publications ==
=== Books ===
- Robinson, Dylan; Igloliorte, Heather; Belcourt, Tony (2021). Promoting and Protecting the Arts and Expressions of Indigenous Peoples: A Compendium of Experiences and Actions. Department of Canadian Heritage.
- Robinson, Dylan (2020). Hungry Listening: Resonant Theory for Indigenous Sound Studies. University of Minnesota Press. ISBN 978-1-5179-0769-3.
- Robinson, Dylan; Levine, Victoria Lindsay, eds (2018). Music and Modernity among First Peoples of North America. Wesleyan University Press. ISBN 978-0-8195-7863-1.
- Robinson, Dylan; Martin, Keavy, eds (2016). Arts of Engagement: Taking Aesthetic Action In and Beyond the Truth and Reconciliation Commission of Canada. Wilfrid Laurier University Press. ISBN 978-1-77112-169-9.
- Robsinon, Dylan; Karantonis, Pamela, eds (2011). Opera Indigene: Re/presenting First Nations and Indigenous Cultures. Interdisciplinary Studies in Opera Series, Ashgate Press. ISBN 978-1-138-25082-6.

=== Book chapters ===
- Robinson, Dylan; Martin, Keavy (2020). "The Body is a Resonant Chamber" in Hungry Listening: Resonant Theory for Indigenous Sound Studies. 1-20.
- Robinson, Dylan (2020). "Intergenerational Sense, Intergenerational Responsibility" in Hungry Listening: Resonant Theory for Indigenous Sound Studies. 43–66.
- Robinson, Dylan (2020). "Acts of Defiance in Indigenous Theatre: A Conversation with Lisa C. Ravenbergen" in Hungry Listening: Resonant Theory for Indigenous Sound Studies. 181–192.
- Robinson, Dylan (2020). "Imagining New Platforms for Public Engagement: A Conversation with Bracken Corlett" in Hungry Listening: Resonant Theory for Indigenous Sound Studies. 305–320.
- Robinson, Dylan (2019). "Speaking to Water, Singing to Stone: Peter Morin, Rebecca Belmore and the Ontologies of Indigenous Modernity" in Music and Modernity among First Peoples of North America. 220–239.
- Robinson, Dylan (2014). "Feeling Reconciliation, Remaining Settled." In Theatres of Affect edited Erin Hurley. Playwrights Canada Press.
- Robinson, Dylan (2012). Listening to the Politics of Aesthetics: Contemporary Encounters between First Nations/Inuit and Early Music Traditions in Aboriginal Music in Contemporary Canada edited by Anna Hoefnagels and Beverley Diamond. 222–248.

=== Articles ===
- Robinson, Dylan. "To All Who Should Be Concerned." In Intersections: Canadian Journal of Music. Vol. 39, 1. pp. 137–44. 2021.
- Robinson, Dylan; Hill, Kanonhsyonne Janice C., Ruffo, Armand Garnet; Couture, Selena; Ravensbergen, Lisa Cooke. "Rethinking the Practice and Performance of Indigenous Land Acknowledgement." In Canadian Theatre Review. Vol, 177 (Winter 2019): 20–30.
- Robinson, Dylan. "Public Writing, Sovereign Reading: Indigenous Language Art in Public Space." In Art Journal. Vol. 76, No. 2 (Summer 2017): 85–99.
- Robinson, Dylan. "Intercultural Art Music and The Sensory Veracity of Reconciliation: Brent Michael Davids' Powwow Symphony on the Dakota Music Tour." In MUSICultures: Journal of The Canadian Society for Traditional Music. In Special Issue, Indigenous Modernities. 39, 1 (2012): 111–128.
- Robinson, Dylan. "Distracting Music." In Musicological Explorations. Vol. 9 (Spring 2008).

== Awards ==
- 2021, Hungry Listening: Resonant Theory for Indigenous Sound Studies, 'Best First Book' award by the Native American and Indigenous Studies Association.
- 2021, Hungry Listening: Resonant Theory for Indigenous Sound Studies, 'Best Book' award from the Canadian Theatre Research and Performance Association.
- 2020, Music and Modernity among First Peoples of North America, American Musicological Society's Ruth Solie Award.
- 2020, Music and Modernity among First Peoples of North America, Society for Ethnomusicology]'s Ellen Koskoff Prize.
