= Belcourt (disambiguation) =

Belcourt Castle is a historic house museum in Rhode Island, United States.

Belcourt may also refer to:

- Belcourt (surname)
- Belcourt, North Dakota, census-designated place in Rolette County, North Dakota, United States
- Belcourt, Quebec, municipality in Quebec, Canada
- Belcourt Theatre, theatre in Nashville, Tennessee, United States
- Belcourt, former name of Belouizdad, commune of the wilayah of Algiers in Algeria
