= Shelburne Basin Venture Exploration Drilling Project =

Canadian oil drilling program

- Country: Canada
- Region: Nova Scotia
- Location: Shelburne Basin
- Offshore/onshore: Offshore
- Operator: Shell
- Partners: Suncor

Field history
- Discovery: 1969

The Shelburne Basin Venture Exploration Drilling Project is an exploratory hydrocarbon drilling program by Shell Canada, the subsidiary of Shell plc in the Shelburne basin approximately 250 kilometers offshore, South of Halifax, Nova Scotia. Shell Canada has proposed up to seven exploration wells within six exploration licenses over a four-year period from 2015 to 2019. Shell carried out a 3D Wide Azimuth seismic survey in 2013, and a seabed survey in the same offshore area in 2014. In June 2015, the Canadian Environmental Assessment Agency published its environmental assessment. The Canada-Nova Scotia Offshore Petroleum Board (CNSOPB) approved the project on October 20, 2015. In September 2016, one of the non-operating partners, Suncor, wrote off its investment in the first exploration well when the operator, Shell, reported that the well was noncommercial (a/k/a dry hole).

== Overview ==
On January 20, 2012, the Canada-Nova Scotia Offshore Petroleum Board (CNSOPB) announced that Shell was the successful bidder on four parcels offshore Nova Scotia and issued Exploration Licenses 2423, 2424, 2425 and 2426 to Shell on March 1, 2012. On January 15, 2013, Shell made a successfully bid on an additional two parcels and was issued Exploration Licenses 2429 and 2430. These six exploration licenses cover an area of roughly 19,845 square kilometers. The areas are located offshore approximately 300 kilometers south of Halifax, Nova Scotia in water depths ranging from 500-3500 m. The purpose of the project is to find and confirm hydrocarbons in the deep water off the coast of Nova Scotia. Shell maintains a 50% working interest and is the operator of the exploration licenses, ConocoPhillips maintains a 30% and Suncor Energy a 20% non-operating interest in the joint venture.

== Project components ==
In 2013 Shell carried out a 3D wide azimuth seismic survey, the first time that such a survey was conducted offshore of Canada, covering 10,850 square kilometers of seismic data. Per Shell, it “differed from traditional 2D or 3D offshore seismic programs in how many seismic boats were used and how they were configured". In 2014, Shell conducted a seabed survey in the same offshore area. It used a multibeam echo sounder mounted to the hull of a single ship for the survey over a maximum of 20 days and the seabed sampling over about 10 days, acquiring multibeam echo sounder data, coring and drop camera imagery of selected seafloor features. The seabed survey was anticipated to take about 45 days from mobilization to demobilization. The seabed survey aimed to identify potential surface hazards before drilling to avoid or prepare for them. Hazards on or within the first few hundred meters below the seafloor include pipelines, wrecks, telecommunications cables, geological features such as deposits of gas hydrates or pockets of shallow gas, steep and/or unstable substrates and man-made or natural seabed obstructions.

== Regulatory actions ==
As part of the Canadian Environmental Assessment Act from 2012 the Canadian Environmental Assessment Agency began an environmental impact statement in January 2014 which it completed in June 2015. Shell's spill containment plan foresees a primary capping stack in place within 12 to 21 days after a blowout, which has been criticized by environmentalists. In the U.S. Shell must have a capping stack “on a vessel nearby on standby that must be deployed within 24 hours” for example at a drilling project in the Chukchi Sea in Alaska.

As of September 2015, the Canada-Nova Scotia Offshore Petroleum Board had not made a decision. The Board has been criticized as being conflicted with interest because one of its members, Douglas Gregory, worked three decades for Shell.

The Canada-Nova Scotia Offshore Petroleum Board (CNSOPB) approved the project on October 20, 2015.

== Environmental impacts considered by Shell ==
Shell undertook acoustic modeling in association with both seismic and MBES to determine potential effects from sound propagation on marine mammals. Because of the narrow bandwidth and limited fan-out from the sides of the ship, and a review of scientific literature on marine mammal hearing, Shell concluded that no mitigation measures were needed.

Shell had considered options for reducing impacts on marine mammals, such as conducting the survey early in the preferred weather window (May to July) to avoid the July to August period when marine mammals are most likely to be in the area, using a higher frequency (30 kHz) MBES system to minimize any acoustic impacts to marine mammals and sea turtles, and using marine mammal observers and fisheries liaison officers on the survey vessel to collect data on marine mammal sighting and behaviors.

Shell plans to abandon the drilling areas immediately after the drilling or testing has taken place even if hydrocarbons are found, in accordance with the Nova Scotia Offshore Petroleum Drilling and Production Regulations. The drilled holes will be plugged with cement in order to prevent any leakage of subsurface compounds. These plugs are placed at varying depths in the well bore to separate and permanently isolate certain subsurface zones to prevent the escape of any subsurface fluids from the well. The drilled areas will be abandoned within seven to ten days of being exposed. As part of well abandonment, approval was sought to leave the wellhead in place. Where removal of the wellhead is required, the wellhead and associated equipment (casing) will be removed up to 1 m below the sea floor by using cutters.

In case of a well blowout, Shell said it needed up to 21 days to cap the well and would deploy a capping stack from Scotland, South Africa, Singapore or Brazil.

== Community and local engagement ==
=== Suppliers ===
Shell hosted several supplier information sessions across the province of Nova Scotia in August 2013 to introduce the project and to engage interested regional suppliers. Shell shared information on employment and contracting opportunities, and on how businesses and individuals might be able to participate. Shell has met with many local businesses one-on-one in the Halifax and Calgary offices or at their facilities in Nova Scotia to understand their capabilities and explain how to make themselves eligible to compete for work on the project. Shell also met suppliers at the Nova Scotia Pavilion at the annual Offshore Technology Conference in Houston in May 2013. Shell is a member of the Maritimes Energy Association and has participated in the Association's programs to reach their supply community members, including speaking at the 2013 CORE Conference. Shell hosted supplier engagement sessions throughout the province.

=== First Nations ===
The Canadian Environmental Assessment Agency or the Canada-Nova Scotia Offshore Petroleum Board require consultation whenever a project may adversely affect potential or established Aboriginal or Treaty Rights. Shell plans to work with the Mi’kmaq Nations of Nova Scotia, the Mi’kmaq and Maliseet Nations of New Brunswick, and the Native Council of Nova Scotia to understand traditional and commercial use of the project area and incorporate that knowledge where feasible in future planning.

The Mi’kmaq First Nations of Nova Scotia consist of 13 bands, 12 of which are represented by the Kwilmu’kw Maw-Klusuuaqn Negotiation Office (KMKNO) regarding consultation among other functions. The Shubenacadie/Indian Brook Mi’kmaq Nation has separated from the KMKNO governance regarding consultation but may work with the remaining bands via the KMKNO on other matters as is a Right of any Nation in the KMKNO. In Nova Scotia, consultation with the Mi’kmaq is the duty of the Crown. Shell supports these consultations and provides information for the Mi’kmaq for its projects, as it deems appropriate. Shell consulted and shared information with the Nova Scotia First Nations. Besides these Nova Scotia First Nations, three First Nations in New Brunswick were also identified by the Agency as having interest in and around the project area and were involved in the assessment. The Maritimes Aboriginal Peoples Council via the Native Council of Nova Scotia has been engaged with the Agency and Shell. The above Aboriginal parties and their representatives identified that some areas surrounding the project are used for commercial and food/social/ ceremonial fishing (offshore and nearshore respectively).

== History of Shell in Canada ==
Shell Canada is the subsidiary of Shell plc and one of Canada's largest integrated oil companies. Shell has been active in Canada since 1911 and is now one of the country's largest integrated oil and gas companies. Headquartered in Calgary, Alberta, Shell Canada employs more than 8,000 people across Canada and has over 1,300 Shell branded retail stations in the country.

=== Nova Scotia ===
Nova Scotia's offshore industry includes oil and natural gas. Shell has operated offshore Nova Scotia since 1963, when it filed for nearly 20 million acres of Federal permits. It participated in 77 or one third of the nearly 200 wells drilled offshore Nova Scotia to date and drilled Nova Scotia's first offshore gas discovery well, Onondaga E-84, in 1969. In 1970, Shell introduced the first offshore oil rig, a semi-submersible Sedco-H made at the Halifax shipyards. Through the early 1970s, Shell drilled 24 wells, making a second discovery at Primrose in 1972 and continued an active exploration program throughout the 1980s. In addition to drilling the first deepwater well offshore Nova Scotia (Shubenacadie H-100), Shell made a number of new gas discoveries (Glenelg, Alma, North Triumph) which led to the development of the Sable Offshore Energy Project, which it owns at 31.3 percent. The project started producing gas on December 31, 1999, and Shell has been a non-operating co-venturer. In 1986 Shell drilled at Panuke discovering light sweet crude oil. While the company was not interested in developing what was thought to be a marginal discovery, it led to the development of Canada's first offshore oil project, the decommissioned Cohasset-Panuke project, which produced a total of 44.5 million barrels between 1992 and 1999 from 16 wells.

=== Local office ===
In April 2013, Shell opened an office in Halifax, Nova Scotia. In 2013, it included Shell's East Coast Operations Manager, a Health, Safety, and Environment Manager and an Office Manager and in 2014, Shell added a local benefits manager responsible for local procurement and benefits.
