= Obesity in Canada =

Share of adults that are obese, 1975 to 2016

Obesity is a growing health concern in Canada, which is "expected to surpass (Note: Based on data from "the 2004 Canadian Community Health Survey: Nutrition, the 1978/79 Canada Health Survey and the 1986 to 1992 Canadian Heart Health Surveys") smoking as the leading cause of preventable morbidity and mortality" and represents a burden (Note: "The direct costs were extracted from the National Health Expenditure Database and allocated to each comorbidity using weights principally from the Economic Burden of Illness in Canada. The study showed that the total direct costs attributable to overweight and obesity in Canada were $6.0 billion in 2006, with 48% attributable to obesity.") of Can$3.96 (US$3.04/€2.75) billion on the Canadian economy each year."

== Obesity rate ==
Public Health of Canada has reported that in 2017, 64% of Canadians over the age of 18 are overweight or obese, and about 30% of children aged 5–17 are overweight or obese. An independent study in the same year by Renew Bariatrics, a bariatric center for obesity treatment in the United States and Canada, reports 650 million adults and 135 million children and adolescents as obese worldwide. Studies suggest that if Canada invests $4.2 billion in treatment for obesity, the obesity rate could be significantly reduced to 29%. In children, obesity has substantially increased between 1978 and 2017, with obesity rates in children increasing from 23% to 30%.

As of 2016, 16% of British Columbians are obese, making it the province with the lowest rate of obesity in Canada. The Northwest Territories have the highest obesity rate, at 33.7%.

== Childhood obesity ==
According to the Public Health Agency of Canada, as of 2017, 30% of children aged 5–17 are overweight or obese. In 2016, 1 in 7 children in Canada were reported to be obese, making almost a third of youth overweight. Since 1979, the rates of childhood obesity have tripled.

The prevalence of severe obesity is of concern in Canada, such that around 1% of Ontario children met the adapted WHO definition of severe obesity (BMI z-score >3) in very early childhood. Specifically, in a cohort of children in Ontario, 0.8% of children under 5 years of age had severe obesity and 2.1% of children 5–6 years of age had severe obesity. The prevalence of severe obesity is known to increase with age, and boys have higher rates of severe obesity than girls. Despite this, the prevalence of severe obesity among children and adolescents in Ontario is consistent with those in other developed countries with the exception of the United States and the prevalence may be plateauing in Ontario. Additionally, children with severe obesity are more likely to have significantly higher blood pressure measures and trends toward worse lipid profiles than children who did not have severe obesity.

In general, children with obesity are at much higher risk of developing health problems, ranging from, asthma, type-2 diabetes, high blood pressure, depression, etc. Dr. Martin Juneau claims diabetes is much more progressive in younger people due to their hormonal growth, complicating blood sugar control and increasing their mortality. In 2016, studies showed a declining rate in childhood obesity in Canada. The authors suggested this is in result of increased public awareness of obesity in children, or the body mass index (BMI) growth charts that were distributed to healthcare providers in 2000. They believe that these charts may have helped providers to educate children, and parents about this epidemic. Research conducted by Angela Devlin, a researcher at University of British Columbia obesity researcher noted, children who were overweight were most likely growing into obese adults. In result, causing a decrease in childhood obesity, and contributing to the increase of adult obesity rates.

== Regional variation ==
Obesity rates in Canadian provinces, 2004: Percent of population obese Percent of population obese or overweight

A 2004 study called the Canadian Community Health Survey, found 29% of Canadians 18 and older were obese and 41% more were overweight (as determined by body mass index). In children and adolescents, 8% were obese and 18% overweight. Rates of obesity varied significantly between the provinces, from an obesity rate of 19% in British Columbia to a rate of 34% in Newfoundland and Labrador.

In 2004, the prevalence of obesity in the three most populated provinces, Ontario, British Columbia and Quebec, matched those of about thirty US states, at a level between 20% and 25%. The study found people that live in cities (Census Metropolitan Areas) had significantly lower obesity rates in Nova Scotia, Ontario, Manitoba, Alberta and British Columbia. In Quebec the relationship approached significance (p=0.08), while in Newfoundland and Labrador, New Brunswick and Saskatchewan the rate of obesity did not vary significantly between CMAs and rural areas. Obesity in such populated areas often affects young adults, ages ranging from 16 to 21. Studies show that an individual who's going through extensive learning often binges on food to help relieve stress. People dealing with stress often turn to eating as a method to help ease or cope with their problems, leading to obesity.

A 2005 report released by the Canadian government's Economics Division reported that "In 2004, approximately 6.8 million Canadian adults aged 20 to 64 were overweight, and an additional 4.5 million were obese. Roughly speaking, an adult male is considered overweight when his body weight exceeds the maximum desirable weight for his height, and obese when his body weight is 20% or more over this desirable weight. A similar guideline holds true for women, but at a threshold of 25% rather than 20%. Dramatic increases in overweight and obesity among Canadians over the past 30 years have been deemed to constitute an epidemic."

In April 2021, British Columbia became the first Canadian province to introduce a tax on sugar-sweetened beverages, a move that the government described as a response to advice from health professionals.

== See also ==
- Health in Canada
- List of sovereign states by body mass index
- First Nations and diabetes
- Epidemiology of obesity
