= Tkaronto =

- Directed by: Shane Belcourt
- Written by: Shane Belcourt
- Produced by: Shane Belcourt; Duane Murray; Jordan O'Connor; Michael Corbiere
- Starring: Duane Murray; Melanie McLaren; Lorne Cardinal
- Cinematography: Shane Belcourt
- Edited by: Jordan O'Connor
- Music by: Jordan O'Connor
- Distributed by: Kinosmith
- Release date: 2007
- Running time: 81 minutes
- Country: Canada
- Language: English

Tkaronto is a Canadian drama film, which premiered in 2007 at the imagineNATIVE Film and Media Arts Festival in Toronto. Directed by Shane Belcourt, the film went into commercial release in the summer of 2008.

The film, named for the Mohawk word from which the name of the city of Toronto is derived, stars Duane Murray and Melanie McLaren as Ray Morrin and Jolene Peltier, who meet while in Toronto on business. Ray, a Métis cartoonist from Vancouver, is in town to pitch an animated series called Indian Jones to a television network, and Jolene, an Anishinaabe artist from Los Angeles, is in town to paint a portrait of Max (Lorne Cardinal), a local indigenous elder.

The film's cast also includes Cheri Maracle, Jeff Geddis, Mike McPhaden, Rae Ellen Bodie, Jonah Allison, Abby Zotz, Sandy Jobin-Bevans and Tricia Williams.

== Themes ==
Ray and Jolene experience a common struggle: as creative professionals living in big cities, they share a sense of disconnection from their indigenous heritage. Both struggle with the question of how to live as an indigenous person in an urban setting devoid of many of the stereotypical signifiers of indigenous identity. Neither was raised with the language, religion and customs of their ancestors; Jolene doesn't even know how to pray. Both are also in relationships with non-indigenous partners: Ray, whose girlfriend is pregnant, is ambivalent about becoming a father, while Jolene's husband is dismissive of her search for a deeper sense of her heritage.

As their attraction to each other grows, Ray and Jolene are forced to confront the choice of whether to throw away their current lives in order to be together.

In a 2008 interview, Belcourt told The Globe and Mail that the film's themes were inspired by conversations with his sister Christi and a friend of hers, Inuit rock singer Lucie Idlout, about how they balanced their own indigenous identities with their urban lifestyles.

== Production ==
Produced by The Breath Films in conjunction with Braincloud Films, the film was shot in just 19 days and completed on a budget of just $20,000.

== Critical response ==
Mari Sasano of the Edmonton Journal wrote that "the strongest parts of the film are when Jolene and Ray are just talking, or even just spending time silently. Unfortunately, there are far too many scenes explaining the significance of symbols, traditions and historical information. Cardinal's character is meant to give Jolene's spiritual side some wings, but in ploddingly laying out what every little thing means, the movie drags, complete with melodramatic violins. Likewise, Ray's scenes with the TV producers are meant to show the racism faced by aboriginals in the media. But the media types come across as so cartoonishly bigoted (complete with googly-eye faces) that one tends to think that Ray isn't so much the victim of racism as he is of his own passivity in not saying anything about it. It's unnecessary to overstate those points. Instead, it would have been far more effective to show how institutionalized, subtle and "civilized" that discrimination can be, as it is in real life, since that is far more insidious than any two-dimensional cartoon villain can ever be."
