= Indian Health Transfer Policy =

Canadian policy on indigenous health control

The Canadian Indian Health Transfer Policy provides a framework for the assumption of control of health services by Indigenous peoples in Canada and set forth a developmental approach to transfer centred on the concept of self-determination in health. Through this process, the decision to enter into transfer discussions with Health Canada rests with each community. Once involved in transfer, communities are able to take control of health program responsibilities at a pace determined by their individual circumstances and health management capabilities.

== Background ==
To put health transfer in context, it is useful to understand from a historical perspective how First Nations, Inuit, Métis and the Canadian federal government through Indian and Northern Affairs have worked together to respond to Indigenous peoples expressed desire to manage and control their own health programs.

=== 1969 White Paper ===
The White Paper was a federal government policy paper which proposed to remove the status of treaty individuals under the Indian Act and to discontinue special services so identified, advocating the increased assimilation of Indigenous people into the culture of Canada.

=== 1970 Red Paper ===
The Red Paper was an Indigenous response to the White Paper emphasizing federal responsibility for health care for First Nations peoples and emphasizing plans to strengthen community control of their lives and of government-delivered community programs.

=== 1975 Indian Relationships Paper ===
The White and Red Papers served as an impetus for the collaborative effort of the federal government and Indigenous peoples to begin serious planning for the future.

This resulted in the 1975 paper, The Canadian Government/The Canadian Indian Relationships, which defined a policy framework for strengthening the control of programs and services by Indigenous peoples. In the health sector, under contribution agreements 75 percent of the bands became responsible for such programs as the Native Alcohol and Drug Abuse Program and the Community Health Representative Program.

=== 1979 Indian Health Policy ===
The stated goal of the Indian Health Policy adopted by the federal government on September 19, 1979, was "to achieve an increasing level of health in Indian communities, generated and maintained by the Indian communities themselves". In this regard, the policy emphasized the historic responsibilities of both federal and provincial governments to provide health services to Indigenous peoples in Canada. It removed the issue of treaty rights from health policy considerations.

The policy reasoned that improvements to the health status of Indigenous peoples should be built on three pillars: (1) community development, both socio-economic and cultural/spiritual, to remove the conditions which limit the attainment of well-being; (2) the traditional trust relationship between Indian people and the federal government; and (3) the interrelated Canadian health system, with its federal, provincial, municipal, Indigenous and private sectors.

A further important aspect of the new policy was the recognition that First Nation and Inuit communities could take over any or all aspects of the administration of their own community health programs, at their discretion and with the support of the Department of National Health and Welfare.

=== 1980 (Berger Report) ===
In 1980, a report of the Advisory Committee on Indian and Inuit Health Consultation was issued, known as the "Berger Report". It recommended methods of consultation that would ensure substantive participation by First Nations and Inuit in the design, management and control of health care services in their communities.

=== 1983 (Penner Report) ===
In 1983, the Report of the Special Committee on Indian Self-Government, known as the "Penner Report", recommended that the federal government establish a new relationship with First Nations and Inuit and that an essential element of this relationship be recognition of Indigenous self-government. The report identified health as a key area for takeover.

=== 1983–1986 Community Health Projects ===
Between 1983 and 1986, the First Nations and Inuit Health Branch sponsored demonstration projects for Indigenous peoples. The experiment was initiated to provide both federal and First Nations authorities with the same substantive information with respect to First Nations control of health services.

=== 1986 Sechelt Band Self-Government Act ===
The Sechelt Indian Band Self-Government Act was passed by Parliament in 1986. In April 1987, the British Columbia Legislative Assembly unanimously passed a bill to give the Sechelt community municipal status. Consequently, the Sechelt Indian Band signed the first self-government agreement in which a First Nations community assumed control of their health services.

=== 1988 Health Transfer south of the 60th parallel ===
In order for the First Nations and Inuit Health Branch to proceed with a health transfer to First Nations as part of administrative reform, the policy framework, authorities and resources had to be developed and secured. A subcommittee on the Transfer of Health Programs to Indian Control was established with representation from First Nations people with experience in health care. The subcommittee incorporated the experiences from the Community Health Projects and recommended a developmental and consultative approach for health transfer. These recommendations were then used to finalize the health transfer policy framework.

On March 16, 1988, the Canadian Cabinet approved the health transfer policy framework for transferring resources for Indigenous health programs south of the 60th parallel to Indigenous control through a process which:

- permitted health program control to be assumed at a pace determined by the community, i.e., the community could assume control gradually over a number of years through a phased transfer;
- enabled communities to design health programs to meet their needs;
- required that certain mandatory public health and treatment programs be provided;
- strengthened the accountability of Chiefs and Councils to community members;
- gave communities:
  - the financial flexibility to allocate funds according to community health priorities and to retain unspent balances;
  - the responsibility for eliminating deficits and for annual financial audits and evaluations at specific intervals;
- permitted multi-year (three to five year) agreements;
- did not prejudice treaty or Aboriginal rights;
- operated within current legislation; and
- was optional and open to all First Nations communities south of the 60th parallel.

=== 1989 Treasury Board Authorities for Transfer ===
In 1989, the Treasury Board approved the financial authorities and resources to support pre-transfer planning and to fund community health management structures.

== Process ==
The process is designed to occur within the present funding base of federal health programs for First Nations, Inuit and Métis peoples. Communities are required to provide certain mandatory programs such as communicable disease control, environmental and occupational health and safety programs, and treatment services.

Initially, the enthusiasm for this process was varied. For some, it was seen as an important link to self-government where the community plans and controls health programs in their communities according to its own priorities. It was seen as a way to develop programs relevant to a community's own cultural and social needs. Others took a more hesitant approach. As the uptake of control of health services by First Nations increased, the Indian Health Transfer Policy began to be seen increasingly by First Nations people as a stepping stone towards the inherent right of self-government.

Transfer became the cornerstone of Health Canada's relationship with First Nations and Inuit communities. Health services transfer agreements between Health Canada and First Nation and Inuit provided the opportunity for communities or First Nations and Inuit organizations to manage their own health programs and services. At first, transfer was the only option communities had for increasing their control over health programs and services beyond contribution agreements. Although many communities were interested in assuming increased control over health services and programs, not all communities were ready to move into this level of control so quickly. It became increasingly apparent that one design could not fit all the diversity of readiness. Some communities expressed interest in alternative strategies which would also give them increased control of resources.

Each year brought pressures for change and restructure in the transfer approach. The First Nations and Inuit Health Branch searched for ways to respond to communities desiring to increase their control of community resources, either through the transfer process, or through other initiatives. This movement was further supported by a decision of the Departmental Executive Committee of Health Canada on March 15, 1994, which directed the First Nations and Inuit Health Branch to commence planning all activities toward the following goals:

- the devolution of all existing First Nations and Inuit Health Branch Indian health resources to First Nations and Inuit control within a time frame to be determined during consultations with First Nations and Inuit communities;
- moving the First Nations and Inuit Health Branch out of the health care service delivery business;
- the transfer of knowledge and capacity to First Nation and Inuit communities so that they could manage and administer their health resources;
- a refocused role for the First Nations and Inuit Health Branch and a refocused role for Health Canada which would take into account the First Nations and Inuit Health Branch's strategic direction.

In further support the search for alternative pathways to transfer, in late 1994, the Treasury Board approved the "Integrated Community-Based Health Services Approach" as a second transfer option for communities to move into a limited level of control over health services.

1995 saw the distribution and implementation of Pathways to First Nations Control Report of Project 07 Strategic Planning Exercise. This cornerstone document set the essential differences between the "Integrated Approach and Transfer". The "Integrated Approach" was an intermediate measure which provides more flexibility than Contribution Agreements, but less flexibility than the transfer agreement.

In 1995, the federal government announced the Inherent Right to Self-Government policy. This policy recognizes First Nations and Inuit have the constitutional right to shape their own forms of government to suit their particular historical, cultural, political and economic circumstances. The policy thus introduced a third option for communities to further increase their control of health services.

Self-governance gives bands more flexibility to establish program priorities in response to tribal needs rather than following federal program objectives. Bands are able to expand, consolidate and create new programs to improve services to their communities and to make certain laws governing their community with respect to health. Furthermore, the range of resources for health programs which can be included in a self-government arrangement is greater than those included in a Health Service Transfer arrangement and may eventually include fixed assets and services under the Non-Insured Health Benefits Program. The flexibility in terms of how resources are allocated is also greater and reporting requirements are fewer.

== See also ==
- Canada Health Act
- Canada Health and Social Transfer
- First Nations and diabetes
- National Aboriginal Health Organization
- Numbered Treaties
- Royal Commission on the Future of Health Care in Canada
- First Nations Health Authority
