= First Nations and diabetes in Canada =

There are high rates of diabetes in First Nations people in Canada compared to the general Canadian population. Statistics from 2011 showed that 17.2% of First Nations people living on reserves had type 2 diabetes.

Contributing factors to the high prevalence of type 2 diabetes between First Nations and the general population include a combination of environmental (lifestyle, diet, poverty), and genetic and biological factors (e.g. thrifty genotype hypothesis, thrifty phenotype). To what extent each factor plays a role is not clear.

== Diabetes mellitus (Type 2) ==
Rates of obesity and diabetes mellitus, commonly referred to as type 2 diabetes (T2D), in First Nations communities was non-existent 20 years ago, but increased steeply. Age-standardized rates show 17.2% prevalence of T2D among First Nations individuals living on reserves, compared to 5.0% in the non-Aboriginal population;

Statistics indicate that the T2D prevalence rate in First Nations people is 3 to 5 times higher than the general Canadian population. As well as having a higher rates of T2D than the general population, there are also differences in the disease pattern in First Nations T2D patients compared to the general population, especially in terms of age of onset and gestational diabetes.

=== Diabetes in youth ===
Diabetes in First Nations has increasingly become a disease of the younger population, experiencing a high burden of diabetes-related complications and co-morbidity. In the general population, T2D is an old-age associated disease, however new diabetes cases peaked in First Nations people between ages 40–49 compared with a non-First Nations peak of age 70+.

This earlier onset of disease in the First Nations population has serious health implications for women, especially during reproductive life-years. There is an increase in chances for children to develop diabetes, contributing to diabetes prevalence and incidence in the future generations.

=== Diabetes in women ===
First Nations women in particular are at risk of developing diabetes, especially between ages 20–49. They have a four times higher incidence of diabetes than non-First Nations women as well as experiencing higher rates of gestational diabetes than non-Aboriginal females, 8–18% compared to 2–4%.

==== Gestational diabetes ====
A third type of diabetes, other than type 1 and type 2, is gestational diabetes mellitus. This is a temporary type of diabetes that occurs during pregnancy. Most people with gestational diabetes will return to normal glucose levels after delivery of the baby; if a woman does not return to normal glucose levels she will be re-diagnosed with T2D and is no longer considered to have gestational diabetes.

Gestational diabetes carries risks for both the mother and the baby. It increases the likelihood of the infant developing T2D, and giving birth to high body-weight baby. High body-weight increases risk of the child developing diabetes even if mother does not have it.

== Screening programs ==
The Review of Guidelines for Screening and Treatment affirms the use of fasting plasma glucose test (FPG) or a 2-hour plasma glucose (2hPG) as a screening tool. Due to the higher incidence of diabetes in Aboriginals, more frequent screening is recommended to improve diabetes management and prevention strategies. Instead of a standard screening every third year, aboriginal adults in Canada with a higher risk of developing diabetes are called upon to be screened every one or two years.

Children above the age of ten identified as at high risk for developing diabetes are recommended for screening, especially important in First Nations and Aboriginal populations, as the age of onset of diabetes is lower (happening in at earlier age) compared to the general population. Obese children (BMI > 99.5) should undergo an oral glucose tolerance test each year. Even though a range of different screening programs for Aboriginals exist, there is a need for screening programs in partnership with communities.

== Current policies ==
The Government of Canada has policies and programs in place aimed at improving the health of Aboriginal people. One such measure was the implementation of the Aboriginal Diabetes Initiative (ADI) in 1999. The ADI has been funded continuously over three phases: Phase 1 (1999–2004); Phase 2 (2005–2010), and; Phase 3 (2011–2015).

The goal of ADI is to reduce the prevalence of type 2 diabetes through health promotion campaigns and initiatives implemented by trained community diabetes workers and health professionals. The ADI has four main components from which the program expects to achieve its objectives.

1. Community-based health promotion and primary prevention
2. Screening and management activities in order to diagnose disease early
3. Capacity building and training activities to equip community health workers and health professional
4. Knowledge mobilization activities to enhance sharing of knowledge

The current Phase 3 includes healthy living initiatives for children, youth, parents, and families; diabetes in pre-pregnancy and pregnancy; community-led food security planning; and enhanced training for health professionals on clinical practice guidelines and chronic disease management strategies.

== See also ==
- National Aboriginal Health Organization
- Indian Health Transfer Policy (Canada)
- Population history of American indigenous peoples
- Royal Commission on the Future of Health Care in Canada
- Obesity in Canada
