= Karla Jessen Williamson =

Executive director, Arctic Institute of North America

- Born: 1954 (age 71–72); Appamiut, Maniitsoq, Greenland, Kingdom of Denmark
- Education: University of Aberdeen, Scotland
- Occupations: Educator, researcher
- Employer(s): previously, University of Saskatchewan
- Known for: Executive Director, Arctic Institute of North America
- Spouse: Robert Gordon Williamson

Karla Jessen Williamson (born 1954 in Appamiut, Maniitsoq, Greenland, Kingdom of Denmark) is an assistant professor of educational foundations at the University of Saskatchewan. Formerly, she was the executive director of the Arctic Institute of North America (AINA), the first woman and first Inuk to hold the position. Fluent in Danish, English, and Greenlandic, she is an educator and researcher on cross-culturalism, multiculturalism, antiracism, and Aboriginal epistemology.

== Early life and education ==
Williamson, a Kalaaleq, was born in Greenland, and received her primary education there. She graduated from high school in Denmark and received her Bachelor's and Master's degrees in Education from the University of Saskatchewan in Canada in 1987. Her Ph.D., from the Department of Anthropology, University of Aberdeen in Scotland, focussed on gender relations in post-colonial Greenland Inuit communities. She also completed her Greenland Teacher Training at the College of Nuuk, Greenland.

== Career ==
"The Arctic is really the canary in the coal mine in terms of climate change." (K. J. Williamson, 2003)

Williamson's research includes Inuit childbearing and gender roles in post-colonial Greenland. She taught for 16 years in the Indian and Northern Education program at the University of Saskatchewan before moving to the AINA on 15 September 2000. She is also a Senior Researcher with the Inuit Tapiriit Kanatami.

Because of her role with the Inuit Tapiriit Kanatami and the Arctic Human Health Initiative, Williamson became the Activity Leader for the IPY 2007–2008 project "Arctic Resiliency and Diversity: Community Response to Change" in collaboration with the Inuit Circumpolar Conference. She is a notable presenter on masking and promotes it for Inuit understanding of gender equality in relationship to ancestors, animals, and the environment. In addition, Williamson has been an editor for the Gabriel Dumont Institute's Journal of Indigenous Studies.

Williamson has served on the Advisory Committee for the Minister of Natural Resources, the Canadian Council on Learning, the Canadian Commission for UNESCO, the Canadian Advisory Council, and the Canadian National Steering Committee for International Polar Year (IPY). She was also appointed to the Greenland Commission for Reconciliation in 2017.

== Personal life ==
Williamson married Robert Gordon Williamson (1931–2012, Oxley, Wolverhampton, Staffordshire, England), an anthropologist, and Professor Emeritus at the University of Saskatchewan. They have two children. She lives near Saskatoon and serves as assistant professor in the Department of Educational Foundations as the University of Saskatchewan. Williamson is the first Inuk to be tenured at a Canadian University.

== Selected works ==
- 1987, "Consequence of Schooling: Cultural Discontinuity amongst the Inuit". Canadian Journal of Native Education. 14 (2), 60–69. OCLC 93453172
- 2000, "Celestial and Social Families of the Inuit." Expressions in Canadian Native Studies. Edited by Ron F. Laliberte, Priscilla Settee, James B. Waldram, Rob Innes, Brenda Macdougall, Lesley McBain, F. Laurie Barron. Aboriginal Program, Extension Division, University of Saskatchewan Extension Press, Saskatoon, Canada.
- 1995, "Canadian Inuit Teacher Training and Inuit Identity". In Ilinniarfissuaq Ukiuni 150-ini. Edited by Daniel Thorleifsen. Atuakkiorfik. Nuuk, Greenland.
- 2004, "Gender Issues". In Arctic Human Development Report. Edited by Oran R. Young and Níels Einarsson. Oddi Printing Co. Reykjavik. Iceland.
- 2010, "Inuit Ways of Knowing: Cosmocentrism and the Role of Teasing in Child Development". In Ethological Case Study: Social conflict and the acquisition and expression of conditioned defeat. Cambridge University Press. Co-authored with Laurence J. Kirmayer.
- 2011, "Inherit my Heaven: Kalaallit Gender Relations". Inussuk, Nuuk.
