= Neil Balnaves =

Australian media executive and arts philanthropist (1944–2022)

Neil Richard Balnaves AO (5 May 1944 – 19 February 2022) was an Australian media executive and arts philanthropist. His production companies were responsible for bringing Big Brother and Bananas in Pyjamas to Australian television screens. He turned to philanthropy after a life-threatening accident in 2002, and founded the Balnaves Foundation in 2006, which by the time of his death had given around A$40 million to arts organisations.

== Early life ==
Neil Richard Balnaves was born on 5 May 1944 in Adelaide, South Australia. He grew up in Penola in the south-east of the state, and had polio as a teenager.

== Career ==
Balnaves' media career started in advertising, in Adelaide in 1960, moving into senior roles in production companies.

Balnaves worked in the media industry for over 60 years. He founded the Southern Star Group in 1988, and was executive chairman of the company. The company later went through various mergers and incarnations, becoming Endemol Australia in 2013/2014, Southern Star was responsible for bringing shows such as Water Rats, and McLeod's Daughters, Big Brother and Bananas in Pyjamas to Australian television screens.

From 2003 until 2016 he was chair of the Ardent Leisure Group, responsible for running theme parks such as Dreamworld in Queensland. Other directorships included Hanna-Barbera Australia and the Taft-Hardie Group.

== Other roles ==
- Chancellor of Charles Darwin University, 2016–2018
- Director and Trustee Member of Bond University
- Board member of the Art Gallery of South Australia, 2013–2019
- Member of the Advisory Council and Dean's Circle at the UNSW Faculty of Medicine
- Director of the Sydney Orthopaedic Research Institute
- Member of the Chairmans Circle at 'Sydney Theatre Company
- Foundation Fellow of the Australian Institute of Company Directors
- Served various advisory and community organisations

== Honours ==
- 2009: Honorary doctorate of the Bond University
- 2010: Appointed an Officer of the Order of Australia, "for service to the community through philanthropic support for the arts, education, medical research and Indigenous programs, and to business" in the Australia Day Honours
- 2010: Honorary doctorate of the University of New South Wales

== Death and legacy ==
Balnaves died on 19 February 2022 in a boating accident while holidaying with his wife, Diane, in Tahiti. He was survived by Diane and children Hamish and Victoria. Their sister Alexandra had died after a long illness in 2019.

== Philanthropy and interests ==
=== Influences ===
It was after a near-death experience caused by a boating accident on the Gold Coast, Queensland in 2002 that Balnaves turned to philanthropy. He sustained injuries which caused pain and inhibited his ability to travel, so he sold Endemol.

He married Diane in 1971, and he ascribes his love of arts to her influence. Growing up with polio, and being on life support for a while and not being able to walk for a year after his 2002 boating accident led to an interest in health and medicine. Having Aboriginal neighbours as a child fostered his interest in Indigenous cultures of Australia.

=== Balnaves Foundation ===
Balnaves established the Balnaves Foundation in 2006, to support the arts, education, and research into medical and social justice issues in Australia. Balnaves said that it was important to him that the foundation focused on "Indigenous Australia, young people and the disadvantaged" in order to help create "a better Australia".

It has given donations to many Australian arts organisations, including the Ensemble Theatre, Bangarra Dance Theatre, the Sydney Biennale, the Art Gallery of New South Wales (AGNSW) the Art Gallery of South Australia (AGSA), the National Gallery of Australia (NGA) and TarraWarra Museum of Art. It also awarded a grant to Guardian Australia specifically for "in-depth reporting on Indigenous affairs, and an in-depth reporting project on Australian arts".

Balnaves also helped to fund Sculpture by the Sea in Sydney, and Australian presentations at the Venice Biennale in a partnership with the Australia Council. He supported the START program at AGSA in Adelaide, giving families with children access to gallery events each week. He believed that governments' attitude towards the arts had deteriorated, and that politicians tended to regard the arts as elitist, and as a consequence funding had decreased enormously. In a 2013 interview, he called the current crop of politicians as a "bunch of philistines". he believed that the arts should be available to all, and that private philanthropists should be proud of supporting the arts.

Around 2007, he provided funding to subsidise tickets to eight shows at the Sydney Opera House per year, for welfare recipients and pensioners to access the arts there.

In 2010, the Balnaves Foundation Australian Sculpture Archive was established at AGNSW "to acquire the archives of major Australian sculptors and to extend research in three-dimensional practice".

In 2011, the foundation started providing support for two Indigenous-led works per year at Belvoir St Theatre in Sydney. It also created the Balnaves Award (won by Nakkiah Lui in its inaugural year, and later Leah Purcell and Ursula Yovich), which has since evolved into the Balnaves Fellowship.

In 2017, Balnaves supported the Adelaide Festival, then under the directorship of Rachel Healy and Neil Armfield, and started the "Tix for Next to Nix" program, which still runs today (as of April 2022). In 2022, A$2,000 was allocated across a number of events, enabling people with a Pension or Health Care Card ro purchase tickets for $5 each.

In 2020, the Balnaves Foundation gave A$1.25 million to the Indigenous Law Centre at UNSW to establish a term chair, known as the Balnaves Chair in Constitutional Law, to allow Professor Megan Davis to continue the work of the Uluru Statement from the Heart. The chair was named in honour of Alexandra Balnaves, who died in 2019. The foundation had had a long relationship with UNSW, by 2020 having given almost A$5.5 million, which included allocations for Indigenous medical scholarships and for funding the UNSW Indigenous Law Centre.

In 2021, the foundation helped to fund Unsettled, an exhibition on the colonisation of Australia through Indigenous perspectives mounted at the Australian Museum in Sydney, enabling free entry to for the more than 70,000 visitors. Balnaves was a strong supporter of the First Nations Division at the museum, and also encouraged others to contribute to supporting the arts and First Nations peoples.

Nick Mitzevich, NGA director, said of Balnaves: "The beauty of his philanthropy was to leverage and do more with the support he gave to make it bigger and better. He was never a passive philanthropist". The Balnaves Contemporary Series supported major annual commissions of contemporary artists from 2018 onwards.

Others to benefit from the foundation's philanthropy are:

- St Vincent's Hospital, Sydney
- Black Dog Institute
- Story Factory
- NIDA's First Nations Program

==== People ====
All three of Neil and Diane Balnaves' children worked for the foundation, and after Neil's death, Diane, Hamish and Victoria continued to work for the foundation, along with a daughter of Alexandra, Caillean Honor. By the time of Balnaves' death on 19 February 2022, the foundation had given away A$40 million over its 15 years of existence, and was continuing to give around A$3 million per year to the arts.
