= Red Rover (film) =

2018 Canadian film

- Directed by: Shane Belcourt
- Written by: Shane Belcourt; Duane Murray
- Produced by: Shane Belcourt; Duane Murray
- Starring: Kristian Bruun; Cara Gee
- Cinematography: Shane Belcourt
- Edited by: Luke Higginson
- Music by: Anthony William Wallace
- Production company: The Story Attic
- Release date: November 30, 2018 (Whistler)
- Running time: 100 minutes
- Country: Canada
- Language: English

Red Rover is a 2018 Canadian science fiction romantic comedy film, directed by Shane Belcourt. The film stars Kristian Bruun as Damon, a depressed and lonely geologist who decides that the solution to his problems is to apply for a Mars to Stay mission, when he meets and falls in love with Phoebe (Cara Gee), a musician who is involved in the promotional campaign to solicit mission volunteers.

The cast also includes Meghan Heffern, Anna Hopkins, Morgan David Jones, Joshua Peace, Laura Wilson and Sugith Varughese.

The film premiered on November 13, 2018, at the Whistler Film Festival, and was screened at the 2019 Canadian Film Festival, before being released commercially in 2020.

== Critical response ==
On the review aggregator website Rotten Tomatoes, 71% of seven critics' reviews are positive.

Several critics, including Chris Knight of the National Post and Barry Hertz of The Globe and Mail, criticized the film for resurrecting the Manic Pixie Dream Girl trope popular in independent films of the early 2010s.
