= Ni-Naadamaadiz: Red Power Rising =

- Directed by: Shane Belcourt
- Screenplay by: Tanya Talaga; Shane Belcourt
- Produced by: Tanya Talaga; Stuart Coxe; Geoff Siskind; Jordan Huffman; Kirsten Scollie
- Starring: Tyler Cameron
- Cinematography: Sean Stiller; Jon Elliott; Rodrigo Michelangeli
- Edited by: Vitold Vidic
- Music by: Tom Wilson; Thompson Wilson
- Production company: Makwa Creative
- Distributed by: Antica Productions
- Release date: September 10, 2025 (TIFF)
- Running time: 83 minutes
- Country: Canada
- Languages: English; Anishinaabemowin

Ni-Naadamaadiz: Red Power Rising is a Canadian documentary film, directed by Shane Belcourt and released in 2025. The film recounts the story of an activist group who occupied Anicinabe Park in Kenora, Ontario, for 38 days in 1974 to protest the legal and social state of First Nations in Canada, spawning a further wave of indigenous activism that included a protest on Parliament Hill and influencing the American Indian Movement in the United States.

== Production and release ==
Journalist and writer Tanya Talaga was also involved in the film as a writer and producer. The film is told largely through the eyes of Tyler Cameron, the son of protest leader Louie Cameron.

Music for the film was composed by Tom Wilson and his son Thompson Wilson, under the band name Tehohàhake.

The film premiered at the 2025 Toronto International Film Festival.

== Critical response ==
Courtney Small of Point of View wrote that "Rightfully giving Cameron and the other protesters the praise they deserve, Ni-Naadamaadiz: Red Power Rising is a moving celebration of the unbreakable nature of the Indigenous spirit. Belcourt’s film highlights why it is important to keep these stories, and those who lived to tell it, at the forefront of Canada’s history."

== Awards ==
The film won the Best Documentary Feature Jury Award at the 2026 Santa Fe International Film Festival.
