= Arctic Institute of North America =

Research institute

The Arctic Institute of North America is a multi-disciplinary research institute and educational organization located in the University of Calgary. It is mandated to study the North American and circumpolar Arctic in the areas of natural science, social science, arts and the humanities. In addition, it acquires, preserves and disseminates information on environmental, physical, and social conditions in the north. The institute was created in 1945 by a Canadian act of Parliament as a non-profit membership organization, and also incorporated in the state of New York.

== History ==
The idea of the institute began in the early 1940s when a group of Canadians discussed ways that Canada could increase administrative, scientific and technical expertise in the Arctic. By 1944, a binational organization that included Canada and the United States, with room for Greenland, Newfoundland, and Labrador was established. Offices were opened at McGill University in Montreal, Quebec, Canada. Geophysicist, Laurence McKinley Gould was selected as acting director, replaced in 1945 by Lincoln Washburn. The initial budget was $10,000.

One of the most important programs of the AINA was to establish a library. In 1955, there were over 1,000 acquisitions. In 1961, there were over 4,800 volumes and 476 serials. There were 7,500 volumes in 1966. Another notable program was the 1948 launch of the journal Arctic which published three issues annually until 1951, after which it became a quarterly publication.

In 1975, the institute moved to the University of Calgary where it has remained.

Dr. Karla Jessen Williamson became its first woman and first Inuk executive director in 2000. Dr. Maribeth Murray, a social scientist and leading arctic researcher, is the current executive director of the institute, appointed in 2013 and reappointed in 2018.

== Databases ==
The ASTIS database was produced by the Arctic Institute of North America from 1978 to 2023. The focus of the Arctic Science and Technology Information System (ASTIS) database is references for publications and research projects about northern Canada. Geographic subject coverage encompasses the three territories, the northern parts of seven provinces and the adjacent marine areas. Format coverage includes abstracts, indexed subject terms, geographic terms, and links to 16,000 online publications.

=== ADA: Arctic Discovery & Access ===
ADA: Arctic Discovery & Access is a digital educational service produced by the Arctic Institute of North America. ADA provides access to scientific research publications, research projects derived from license and permit information, K–12 educational resources, data management resources for researchers, virtual exhibits, and the Arctic Institute of North America's online archives and special collections.

The ADA database contains metadata records for over 80,000 publications and research project descriptions. ADA metadata records are catalogued using MARC 21 standards, include schema.org descriptive mark-up, and follow the Open Archives Protocol for Metadata Harvesting (OAI-PMH).

ADA launched in November 2023 and expands upon the former Arctic Science and Technology Information System (ASTIS), which began operations in May 1978.

== Academic journal ==
The Arctic Institute of North America publishes a peer reviewed, scientific journal, entitled Arctic. The journal publishes scholarly articles, book reviews, and notable people on all topics related to the polar and subpolar regions of the world.

== UArctic Membership ==
The Arctic Institute of North America is an active member of the University of the Arctic. UArctic is an international cooperative network based in the Circumpolar Arctic region, consisting of more than 200 universities, colleges, and other organizations with an interest in promoting education and research in the Arctic region.

== Archives ==
There is an Arctic Institute of North America fonds at Library and Archives Canada. Archival reference number is R4614.

== See also ==
- Arctic policy of Canada
