= Alternative Law Journal =

- Discipline: Law reform
- Language: English
- Edited by: Melissa Castan, Bronwyn Naylor

Publication details
- Former name: Legal Service Bulletin
- History: 1974-present
- Publisher: SAGE Publications on behalf of the Legal Service Bulletin Co-operative (Australia)
- Frequency: Quarterly
- Impact factor: 0.34 (2018)

Standard abbreviations
- ISO 4: Altern. Law J.

Indexing
- ISSN: 1037-969X (print); 2398-9084 (web)
- LCCN: 2010250832
- OCLC no.: 643814507

Links
- Journal homepage; Online access; Online archive

The Alternative Law Journal is a quarterly peer-reviewed law journal covering law reform. It is published by SAGE Publications on behalf of the Legal Service Bulletin Co-operative (Melbourne, Australia). The journal was established in 1974 as the Legal Service Bulletin, obtaining its current name in 1992.

As of 2018 the editors-in-chief are Melissa Castan (Monash University) and Bronwyn Naylor (RMIT University). The journal is abstracted and indexed in the Emerging Sources Citation Index, EBSCO databases, ProQuest databases, and Scopus.

The Aboriginal Law Bulletin was issued with the Legal Service Bulletin from 1981 to 1991 and with Alternative Law Journal from 1992 to 1995.
