= Megan Davis =

Australian human rights lawyer and Aboriginal activist

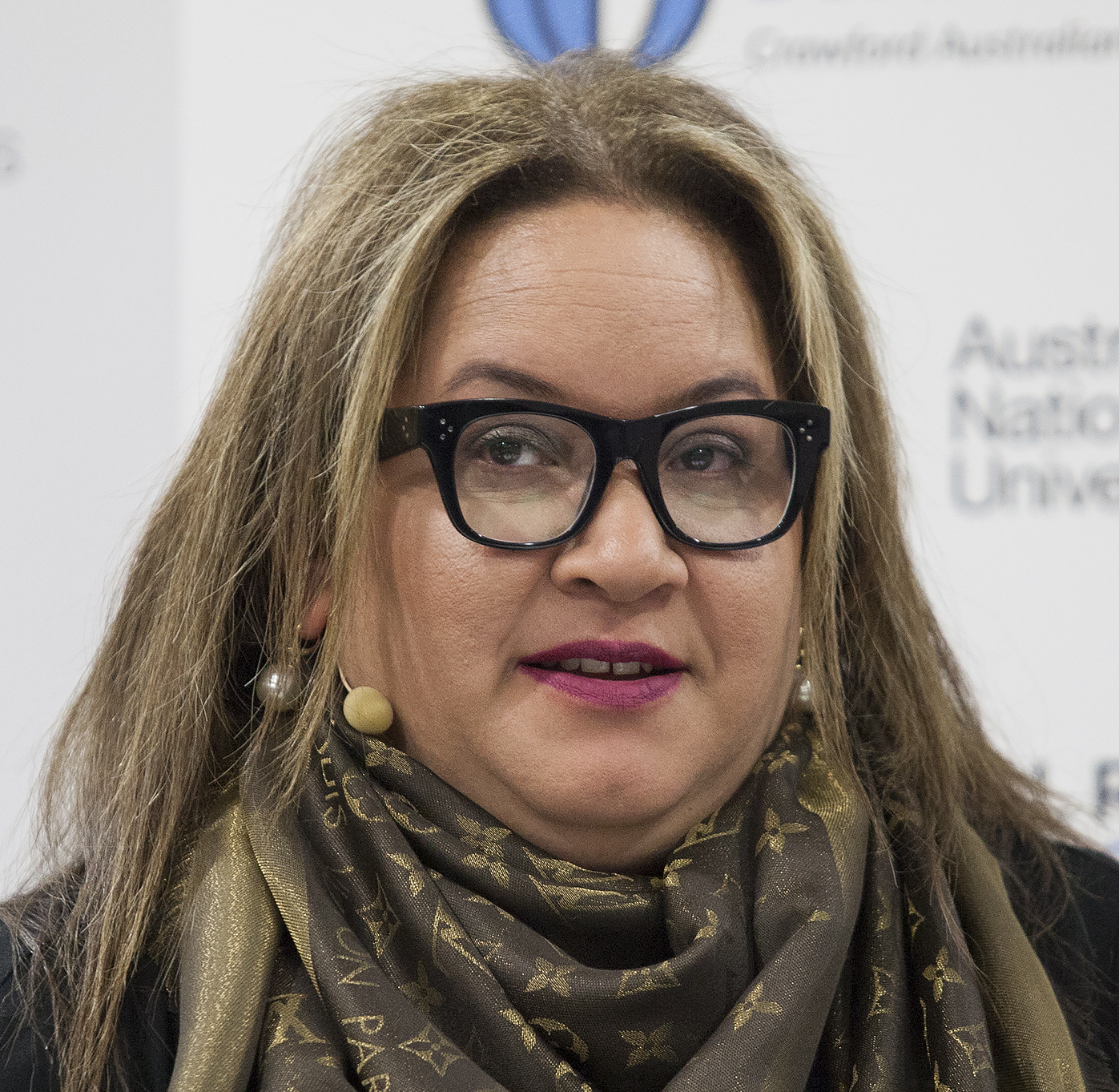
- Born: October 1975
- Education: Australian National University
- Awards: Fellow of the Academy of the Social Sciences in Australia (2017); Fellow of the Australian Academy of the Humanities (2023); Companion of the Order of Australia (For eminent service to the law and to social justice, to the national and international advocacy of the rights of Indigenous peoples, and to the community., Scientia Professor Megan Jane DAVIS, 2025)
- Scientific career
- Workplaces: University of New South Wales (2017–); University of New South Wales (2006–2016)
- Website: research.unsw.edu.au/people/professor-megan-jane-davis

Megan Jane Davis (born October 1975) is an Australian constitutional lawyer and public law expert who holds the Balnaves Chair in Constitutional Law at UNSW and is the Director of the Indigenous Law Centre, UNSW. She has held the Gough Whitlam and Malcolm Fraser Chair in Australia Studies at Harvard University and visiting professor, Harvard Law School. Davis specialises in Indigenous peoples and the law, democracy, and the constitutional recognition of First Nations. She is known for her work on the Uluru Statement from the Heart. She designed the Referendum Council's deliberative process that led to the Statement.

Davis was a United Nations expert on the UN Permanent Forum on Indigenous Issues (2011–2016) and UN expert on Indigenous rights on the UN Expert Mechanism on the Rights of Indigenous Peoples (EMRIP) (2017–2022). She was the first Indigenous woman from Australia to be elected via ECOSOC competitive elections to serve on a United Nations body and also served as Rapporteur and Chair of the UN Permanent Forum on Indigenous Issues. Davis also served as deputy chair and Chair of EMRIP.

Davis is a Fellow of the Australian Academy of Law, the Australian Academy of Social Sciences, and the Australian Academy of the Humanities. She was appointed a Companion of the Order of Australia (AC) in the 2025 Australia Day Honours for her service to law and Indigenous people.

== Early life and education ==
Megan Jane Davis was born in October 1975 in Monto. Her family moved along the Queensland Railway. Her ancestry is Aboriginal Australian (Cobble Cobble, from south-east Queensland) and South Pacific Islander.

Davis was brought up by a single mother and one of her earliest interests was the Australian Constitution and the United Nations General Assembly. She attended the University of Queensland, graduating with a Bachelor of Arts and Bachelor of Laws in 1999. While studying, she met and was mentored by Jackie Huggins, who convinced her to work for the Foundation for Aboriginal and Islander Research Action (FAIRA) in Brisbane, which led her to apply to the United Nations Fellowship. She also worked as a Legal Cadet at the Aboriginal and Torres Strait Islander Commission.

== Career ==
In 1999, Davis became the first Indigenous Australian to be awarded a United Nations Indigenous Fellowship in the United Nations Office for Human Rights, based in Geneva. Davis worked as an international lawyer at the United Nations, where from 1999 until 2004 she helped draft the United Nations Declaration on the Rights of Indigenous Peoples, and provided legal advice to ATSIC Commissioners during the drafting stages.

In 2010, Davis was elected by the UN Economic and Social Council as an expert member of the United Nations Permanent Forum on Indigenous Issues, making her the first Indigenous Australian woman elected to a United Nations Body. She served two terms as an expert member from 2011 to 2016, having been elected for a second term in 2013. Davis was also elected as Chair of the Permanent Forum in 2015.

In 2017, Davis was elected by the UN Human Rights Council to the United Nations Expert Mechanism on the Rights of Indigenous Peoples. She was appointed for a second term from 2019 to 2022, and was appointed as chair in 2021. Davis held portfolios including Administration of Justice and Gender and Women and was the focal point for UN Women and UN AIDS. Davis was the Rapporteur of the UN Expert Group Meeting on an Optional Protocol to the UNDRIP as well as the author of a UNPFII study on a supervisory mechanism for UNDRIP (2014). Davis was the UN Rapporteur for the 2012 International Expert Group Meeting on Combating violence against indigenous women and girls: article 22 of the United Nations Declaration on the Rights of Indigenous Peoples, which produced the first major UN report on Indigenous women, and was the UN Rapporteur for the International EGM on Indigenous Youth.

Davis was on the Australian Government's Expert Panel on the Recognition of Aboriginal and Torres Strait Islander Peoples in the Constitution in 2011, and was a member of the Prime Minister's Referendum Council from 2015 to 2017. As a member of the Referendum Council, Davis was instrumental in assisting the development of the Uluru Statement from the Heart, designing the deliberative dialogues and chairing the council's sub-committee for the First Nations regional Dialogues and the First Nations Constitutional Convention in 2017.

Davis served on the Referendum Working Group, Referendum Engagement Group, and the Attorney General's Constitutional Expert Group from 2022 to 2023 that advised on the Voice to Parliament referendum in 2023. She is co-chair of the Uluru Dialogue – the group of First Nations leaders who lead the Uluru Statement from the Heart work.

Davis has been the Director of the Indigenous Law Centre (part of the UNSW law faculty) since 2006. She was appointed UNSW Pro Vice-Chancellor Indigenous in 2017 and Balnaves Chair in Constitutional Law in 2020. She is currently the Pro Vice-Chancellor, Society at UNSW.

Davis was a Commissioner on the QLD Commission of Inquiry into Youth Detention Centres in 2016 alongside co-Commissioner Kathryn McMillan KC. She was also the chair and author of 'Family is Culture', an inquiry into NSW Aboriginal Children in Out of Home care (2017–2019). In 2023, she wrote "Voice of Reason: On Recognition and Renewal" which was published by Quarterly Essay.

== Other roles ==
In 2017, Davis was appointed a Commissioner on the Australian Rugby League Commission. In 2020, she was reappointed for another term. Davis has described growing up in a "crazy rugby league family", and wanting to "give back to a game that gave so much to me and my family". Davis is also a Director on the North Queensland Cowboys Community Foundation Board, a Commissioner for the South Australian Rugby League Commission, and formerly a director on the Western Australia Rugby League Commission.

== Awards and honours ==
- 2013 National Australia Bank/Women's Agenda Inspirational Ambassador Award
- 2014 University of Queensland Indigenous Community Impact Award
- 2017 elected Fellow of the Academy of the Social Sciences in Australia and Fellow of the Australian Academy of Law She was also named as one of the 10 most influential people in Australian culture by The Australian Financial Review in 2017.
- 2018 winner of The Australian Financial Review 100 Women of Influence award and winner of the public policy category
- 2018 Indigenous Alumna of the Year, ANU
- 2021 honorary doctorate from University of Queensland
- 2022 accepted the Sydney Peace Prize alongside Pat Anderson and Noel Pearson, on behalf of the Uluru Statement From the Heart
- 2022 named one of Australia's top 5 Legal Powerbrokers by the Australian Financial Review
- 2023 elected a Fellow of the Australian Academy of the Humanities
- 2023 named the Marie Claire "Powerhouse of the Year"
- 2024 PeaceWomen Award by the Women's International League for Peace & Freedom (WILPF)
- 2025 awarded a Companion of the Order of Australia
