= Gabriel Dumont Institute =

Canadian non-profit organization

Gabriel Dumont Institute of Native Studies and Applied Research
- Other name: GDI
- Type: Non-profit Corporation
- Established: 1980
- Affiliations: Saskatchewan Institute of Applied Science and Technology, ACCC, CCAA, University of Saskatchewan, University of Regina
- Executive Director: Geordy McCaffrey
- Location: urban/suburban, Regina, Saskatoon, Prince Albert, and additional offices throughout Saskatchewan, Saskatchewan, Canada; 52°07′46″N 106°42′34″W
- Campus: Regina, Saskatchewan, Saskatoon, Saskatchewan, and Prince Albert, Saskatchewan
- Website: www.gdins.org

The Gabriel Dumont Institute (GDI), formally the Gabriel Dumont Institute of Native Studies and Applied Research Inc., is a non-profit corporation serving the educational and cultural needs of the Saskatchewan Métis and Non-Status Indian community, and is the officially-designated education arm of the Métis Nation—Saskatchewan (MN-S).

Formally incorporated in 1980, GDI offers a variety of accredited educational, vocational, and skills-training opportunities for the province's Métis community in partnership with the University of Regina, the University of Saskatchewan, Saskatchewan Polytechnic, the province's various regional colleges, and Service Canada.

The institute has multiple campuses in Regina, Saskatoon, and Prince Albert, and offers various classes throughout Saskatchewan communities.

== Organization ==
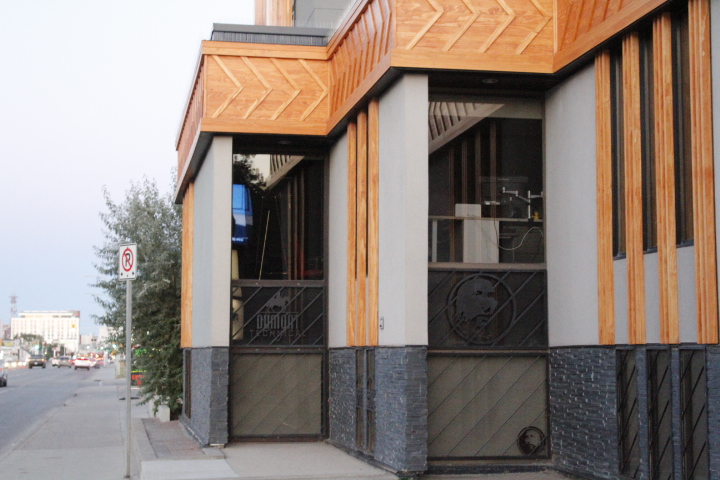
Gabriel Dumont Institute seen from 22nd street

The Gabriel Dumont Institute was formally incorporated as a non-profit corporation in 1980. The institute serves the educational and cultural needs of the Saskatchewan Métis and Non-Status Indian community.

GDI's mission is to promote the renewal and development of Métis culture through research, materials development, collection and distribution of those materials and the design, development and delivery of Métis-specific educational programs and services.

== Incentives and partnerships ==
The institute offers accredited educational, vocational, and skills training opportunities for the province's Métis in partnership with the University of Regina, the University of Saskatchewan, Saskatchewan Polytechnic, and the province's various regional colleges. GDI has also created many partnerships for the GDI Scholarship Foundation. These partnerships include SaskEnergy, SaskTel, Cameco, and the Saskatoon Health Region.

The Government of Canada sponsors an Aboriginal Bursaries Search Tool that lists over 680 scholarships, bursaries, and other incentives offered by governments, universities, and industry to support Aboriginal post-secondary participation. Gabriel Dumont Institute scholarships for Aboriginal, First Nations and Métis students include: Gabriel Dumont Award; and the SaskEnergy Incorporated Scholarship Program.

== History ==
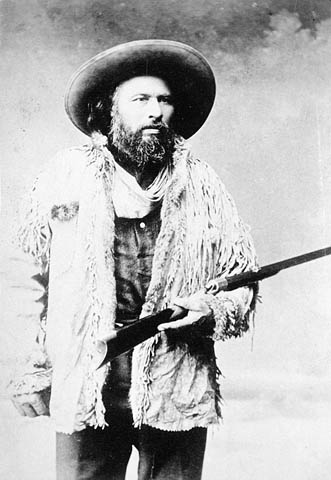
Gabriel Dumont

The Gabriel Dumont Institute takes its name from Gabriel Dumont, a renowned political and military leader of the Saskatchewan Métis in the 19th century.

The institute came about as a follow-up to a Métis Cultural Conference that initiated planning for what was then called the "Metis Education Institute." In 1980, the Gabriel Dumont Institute was formed and SUNTEP began its operations. This was also the year that the institute hosted the first Annual Cultural Conference.In 1983, the institute began federal sponsored preparatory, credit skills training, and university programs.

In 1991, the Dumont Technical Institute (DTI) was established as a federated institute of SIAST (now, Saskatchewan Polytechnic). In 1992, the institute expanded to be included in all provincial community colleges and SIAST's for technical and Adult Basic Education (ABE). In 1993, the institute signed an Affiliation Agreement with the University of Saskatchewan, thus creating the Gabriel Dumont College (GDC). In 1995, a two-year Métis Teacher Associate Certificate Program was developed by the institute and the University of Saskatchewan. In 1996, GDC began to offer Arts and Science classes. Between 2001 and 2003 the institute began branching out, first by DTI buying of a central administration building in Saskatoon, then by moving into more centres in Saskatoon and Regina. In 2003 they also launched The Virtual Museum of Metis History and Culture.

In 2006, Gabriel Dumont Institute Training & Employment (GDIT&E) was established to assist Saskatchewan's Métis looking to improve their educational and employment outcomes. GDIT&E has service delivery sites established in 11 communities across the province.

== Awards ==
Saskatchewan Book Awards for The Bulrush Helps the Pond(Ken Carriere, 2002), Metis Legacy (Lawrence J. Barkwell, Leah Dorion, Darren R. Prefontaine, 2001), Expressing Our Heritage: Metis Artistic Designs (Cheryl Troupe, 2003), The Métis Alphabet Book (Joseph Jean Fauchon, 2006), Dancing in My Bones (Anne Patton and Wilfred Burton, 2009), and most recently, winning the Publishing Award and Book of the Year for Gabriel Dumont: Li Chef Michif in Images and in Words (Darren R. Prefontaine, 2011). The GDI Publishing Department has also received many more nominations for their resources from the Saskatchewan Book Awards.

Other awards for the GDI Publishing Department include the 2009 Corporate Partner of the Year which recognized the partnership between GDI and the Batoche National Historic Park at the Saskatchewan Tourism Awards of Excellence. In 2010, Dancing in My Bones also won a Moonbeam Gold Medal Spirit Award for Native Folklore.

== Museum and archives ==
The Gabriel Dumont Institute Archives houses official records of, or relating to, or people/activities connected with Gabriel Dumont Institute. The archival collection consists of art/artefacts, oral histories, print, video, and audio recordings. The Virtual Museum of Métis History and Culture collection consists of photographs, videos, costumes, furnishings, textiles, artwork, Oral History records, and textual records. The mission of the Virtual Museum of Métis History and Culture is to help promote and preserve Métis culture.

== Programs ==
- Saskatchewan Urban Native Teacher Education Program (SUNTEP)
- Gabriel Dumont College (GDC)
- Dumont Technical Institute (DTI)
- Gabriel Dumont Institute Training & Employment Inc. (GDI T&E)
- Bachelor of Education (SUNTEP, since 1980 over 1000 educators trained)
- Bachelor of Arts and Science (GDC, delivers only the first two years of the program)
- Adult Basic Education, skills training, vocational and cultural programs (DTI based)
- Library Information Services (GDI, Métis-specific library system, Saskatoon, Regina, and Prince Albert)
- Publishing Department (based in Saskatoon, has produced over 100 literary, cultural and educational resources relating to Métis history and culture)
- Finance and Administration (Saskatoon-based, oversees the institute's financial and personnel management)
- Métis Cultural Development Fund (partnership with SaskCulture Inc, funds activities for the community to strengthen Métis culture)
- Scholarships (Gabriel Dumont Institute Scholarship Foundation: Napoleon LaFontaine Scholarships, SaskEnergy Scholarships, SaskTel Scholarships, GDI-Cameco Scholarship, Graduate Bursary and more, which provide applicants with access to post-secondary education)

== See also ==
- Higher education in Saskatchewan
- List of colleges in Canada#Saskatchewan
- List of universities in Canada#Saskatchewan
- Journal of Indigenous Studies
