= Lawrence J. Barkwell =

Canadian historian (1943-2019)

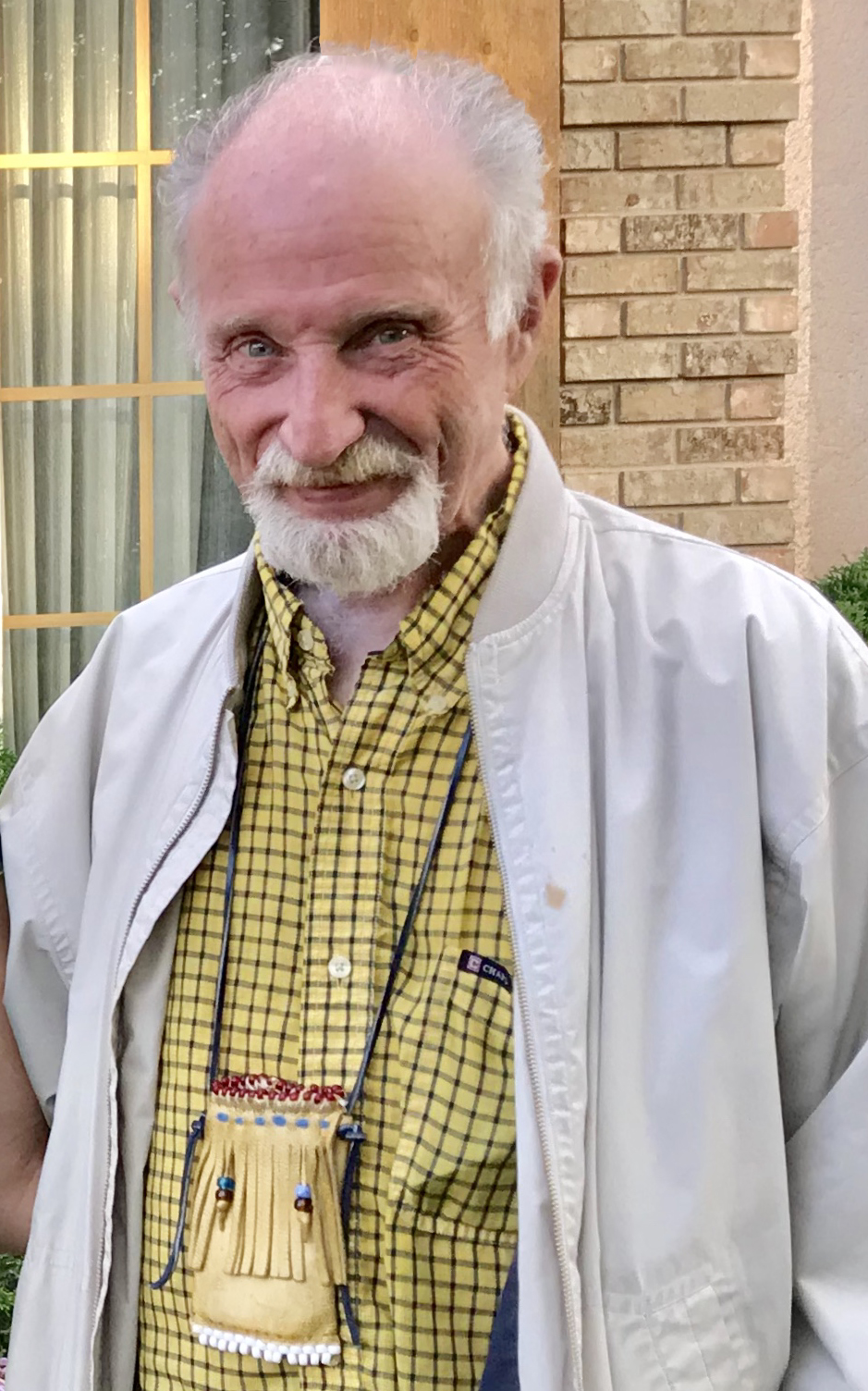
- Lawrence J. Barkwell, Winnipeg, 2018
- Born: 1943; Ontario, Canada
- Died: 26 September 2019 (aged 75–76); Winnipeg, Manitoba, Canada
- Education: University of Winnipeg, BA Lakehead University, MA
- Occupations: Author, historian, editor, lecturer
- Spouse: Dr. Diana Weekes Barkwell (d. 2016)
- Children: 2
- Writing career
- Pen name: Laurent LaPrairie
- Genre: History
- Notable awards: Queen Elizabeth II Diamond Jubilee Medal Saskatchewan Book Award for Publishing in Education

Lawrence J. Barkwell (born 1943 – 26 September 2019) was a Canadian author, editor, historian, and lecturer, best known for his comprehensive writings on the Métis Nation and Culture. He served as senior historian at Manitoba Métis Federation's Louis Riel Institute from 2006 until his death in September 2019. He was a member of the board of directors of the Friends of Upper Fort Garry. He was Honorary Elder for the St. Norbert Parish la Barrière Métis Council.

Barkwell has made entries in the Encyclopedia of French Cultural Heritage in North America, the Canadian Encyclopedia, and has contributed numerous articles to the Virtual Museum of Metis History and Culture. His earlier research and writing was in the area of Juvenile Corrections (Canadian J. Criminology & Corrections Vol. 18 (4): 363 (1976) Differential Treatment of Juveniles on Probation; An Evaluative Study).

== Awards ==
Barkwell is an award recipient of the Queen Elizabeth II Diamond Jubilee Medal (2012), and a recipient of the Saskatchewan Book Award for Publishing in Education (2002). On February 15, 2019, he received the Aboriginal Circle of Educators Honouring Our Allies Award.

== Bibliography ==
Below is a list books published by Barkwell (sometime co-authored):

- Corrigan, S. and Lawrence Barkwell (1991). The Struggle for recognition: Canadian justice and the Métis Nation. Winnipeg: Pemmican Publications. ISBN 0921827180
- Shore, Frederick and Lawrence Barkwell (1997). Past reflects the present: the Metis Elders' Conference. Winnipeg: Manitoba Metis Federation. ISBN 0968349307
- Barkwell, Lawrence J.; Dorion, Leah; Prefontaine, Darren (1999). Resources for Metis Researchers. Winnipeg: Louis Riel Institute of the Manitoba Métis Federation; Saskatoon, Sask.: Gabriel Dumont Institute of Native Studies and Applied Research. ISBN 0920915442
- Barkwell, Lawrence J.; Dorion, Leah; Prefontaine, Darren (2001). Métis Legacy: A Historiography and Annotated Bibliography. Winnipeg: Pemmican Publications Inc. ISBN 1-894717-03-1.
- Barkwell, Lawrence J. et al (2004). La lawng: Michif Peekishkwewin; the heritage language of the Canadian Metis. Winnipeg: Pemmican Publications. ISBN 1894717228 (v. 1), ISBN 1894717287 (v. 2)
- Barkwell, Lawrence J.(2005). Batoche 1885 : the militia of the Metis liberation movement. Winnipeg: Manitoba Metis Federation. ISBN 0968349331
- Barkwell, Lawrence J.; Dorion, Leah; Hourie, Audreen (2006). Métis Legacy (Volume II) Michif Culture, Heritage, and Folkways. Winnipeg: Pemmican Publications Inc. and Saskatoon: Gabriel Dumont Institute. ISBN 0-920915-80-9.
- Barkwell, Lawrence J.(2011). Veterans and families of the 1885 Northwest Resistance. Saskatoon : Gabriel Dumont Institute. ISBN 9781926795034
- Barkwell, Lawrence J.; Prefontaine, Darren (2016). A Métis studies bibliography : annotated bibliography and references. Winnipeg, Manitoba : Louis Riel Institute; Saskatoon, Saskatchewan : Gabriel Dumont Institute. ISBN 9781927531075
- Barkwell, Lawrence J. (2018). Historic Metis Settlements in Manitoba and Geographic Place Names. Winnipeg: Louis Riel Institute. ISBN 978-1-927531-18-1.
