= Congress of Aboriginal Peoples =

Canadian indigenous peoples organization

The Congress of Aboriginal Peoples (CAP) (formerly the Native Council of Canada and briefly the Indigenous Peoples Assembly of Canada), founded in 1971, is a national Canadian aboriginal organization that represents Aboriginal peoples (Non-Status and Status Indians, Métis, and Southern Inuit) who live off Indian reserves in either urban or rural areas across Canada. As of 2011 more than 70% of Aboriginal people live off-reserve.

Its head office is located in the capital, Ottawa, Ontario. The congress works with its affiliate organizations on issues that affect the Aboriginal peoples of Canada who live off-reserve. Affiliates of the congress have their own constitutions with some being separately funded through the Métis and Non-Status Indian Relations Directorate of the Department of Aboriginal Affairs and Northern Development Canada. The Métis and Non-Status Indian Relations Directorate works primarily with Aboriginal political organizations who represent the interests of Métis and non-status Indians (MNSI) and other off-reserve Aboriginal organizations.

The congress administers the Aboriginal Skills and Employment Training Strategy (ASETS), which links training to labour market demand. ASETS is designed to help Aboriginal people who live off-reserve prepare for and find high-demand jobs.

== Significant events ==
After the collapse of the National Indian Council in 1968 the executives of provincial Metis and Non-Status Indian associations of British Columbia, Alberta, Saskatchewan, and Manitoba met in December 1970 to found the Native Council of Canada. Its constitution was completed in February 1971 and the organization opened its offices in Ottawa not long afterwards. The organization had to balance the (often divergent) interests of Metis and Non-Status Indian organizations in order maintain its membership and secure core funding from the Canadian state.

In 1983 the Métis split from the Native Council of Canada, a pan-Aboriginal coalition, to form the Métis National Council as a Métis-specific representative group. The founding affiliates of the Métis National Council were the Métis Association of Alberta, the Association of Métis and Non-Status Indians of Saskatchewan, the Manitoba Metis Federation, the Louis Riel Métis Association of British Columbia, the Robinson-Superior Métis Association, and the Alberta Federation of the Métis Settlement Associations.

In 1993 the Native Council of Canada was reorganized and renamed as the Congress of Aboriginal Peoples (CAP).

On April 14, 2016 a landmark ruling by the Federal Court of Canada affirmed the position of the Congress of Aboriginal Peoples that Métis and Non-status are Indians with rights under the Constitution. The Federal Court Action was launched in 1999 by Harry Daniels, Leah Gardner, and the Congress of Aboriginal Peoples. This decision could have a significant effect on the relationship between the Government of Canada and the Aboriginal Peoples who live off-reserve.

The organization briefly changed its name to the Indigenous Peoples Assembly of Canada for seven months in 2016. This was reversed in October 2016 after the national chief associated with the name change, Dwight Dorey, was defeated in a bid for reelection. Robert Bertrand won the election to national chief.

== National Chief ==
List of National Chiefs:

- Brendan Moore (2025-Present)
- Elmer St. Pierre (2020–2025)
- Robert Bertrand (2016–2020)
- Dwight Dorey (2015–2016), (Mi'kmaq from Nova Scotia; this was his second term)
- Betty Ann Lavallée (2009–2015)
- Patrick Brazeau (2006–2009)
- Dwight Dorey (1999–2006)
- Harry Daniels (1997–1999)
- Jim Sinclair (1994–1996)
- Ron George (1992–1994)
- Dan Smith (1991–1992)
- Viola Robinson (1990–1991)
- Chris McCormick (National Spokesperson −1988-1990)
- Smokey Bruyere (1981–1988)
- Harry Daniels (1976–1981)
- Gloria George (1975–1976)
- Kermit Moore (1974–1975)
- Tony Belcourt (1971–1974).

== Affiliate organizations ==
Also known as provincial/territorial organizations (PTOs), the congress has affiliate Aboriginal organizations in Canada's respective provinces and territories who choose the congress to represent them at a national level. Each organization holds its own constitution and by-laws and some are individually funded through Government of Canada programs. In effect, these affiliates are the corporate members of the congress. Each affiliate organization also has a respective provincial chief and president who make up the Board of Directors of the congress. The congress' Annual General Assembly is attended by delegates from each provincial affiliate organizations to discuss policy, priorities, and issues facing Aboriginal peoples who live off-reserve.

The following is a list of the organizations that associate with CAP as of November 21, 2012:

- Aboriginal Affairs Coalition of Saskatchewan
- Alliance Autochtone du Quebec Inc
- Federation of Newfoundland Indians (Qalipu Mi'kmaq First Nation Band)
- Labrador Métis Nation (Nunatukavut)
- New Brunswick Aboriginal Peoples Council
- Native Council of Nova Scotia
- Native Council of Prince Edward Island
- Ontario Coalition of Aboriginal Peoples
- United Native Nations Society (British Columbia)
- North West Indigenous Society

== See also ==
- Indian and Northern Affairs Canada
- Indian Register
- Indian Act
- List of organizations that self-identify as FNIM governments
- Royal Commission on Aboriginal Peoples
- The Canadian Crown and Aboriginal peoples
- Assembly of First Nations
