= Shane Belcourt =

Canadian film director

Shane Anthony Belcourt
- Born: December 30, 1972 (age 53); Ottawa, Ontario, Canada
- Occupations: filmmaker, musician
- Parent(s): Tony Belcourt, Judith Pierce-Martin
- Relatives: Christi Belcourt, Suzanne Belcourt
- Website: Shane Belcourt

Shane Anthony Belcourt (born December 30, 1972) is a Métis writer, director, and cinematographer. He is best known for his 2007 feature film Tkaronto, which depicts the life of urban Métis and First Nations people.

== Biography ==
Belcourt was born in Ottawa, Ontario on December 30, 1972, to parents Tony Belcourt and Judith Pierce-Martin (née Streatch). He is the brother of graphic designer Suzanne Belcourt and painter Christi Belcourt.

The majority of his work explores and celebrates Canadian indigenous issues and culture. He wrote and directed the short films The Squeeze Box (2005) and Pookums (2006) before his debut feature film, Tkaronto, premiered at the 2007 imagineNATIVE Film and Media Arts Festival.

Following Tkaronto, he directed additional short films, including Boxed In (2009), Keeping Quiet (2010), F*%K Yeah!! (2010), Say Yes (2012) and A Common Experience (2013). He was a writer and director on Lisa Charleyboy's APTN documentary series Urban Native Girl, and codirected the television documentary Indictment: The Crimes of Shelly Chartier with Lisa Jackson for CBC Docs POV.

His second feature film, Red Rover, premiered in 2018.

His documentary film Beautiful Scars, about musician Tom Wilson and his late-life discovery of his Mohawk heritage, premiered at the 2022 Hot Docs Canadian International Documentary Festival.

His third narrative feature film, Warrior Strong, went into production in 2022, and premiered at the 2023 Cinéfest Sudbury International Film Festival.

His documentary film Ni-Naadamaadiz: Red Power Rising premiered at the 2025 Toronto International Film Festival.
