= Native Council of Nova Scotia =

Canadian Mi'kmaq/Aboriginal organization

The Native Council of Nova Scotia represents about 25,000 Mi'kmaq/Aboriginal peoples who are non-status or live off-reserve in rural and urban Nova Scotia and issues its own identity cards. It works to improve their social, economic and political situation. Its head office is in Truro, and it has offices in Sydney, Nova Scotia, Liverpool, Dartmouth, Digby and Coldbrook.

== Identity issues ==
According to Canada's 2016 census, 51,495 Nova Scotians claim Aboriginal identity, but only 18,940 were considered "status Indians", and 40.1 per cent of those live outside reserves. Many individuals choose to live off-reserve and relocate to an urban area like Halifax to seek education, employment or other economic opportunities. They are no longer members of Nova Scotia's 13 on-reserve bands and are not included in the Mi'kmaq-Nova Scotia-Canada Tripartite Forum. They are not consulted over decisions related to natural resources and environment, and lose their land and hunting rights. The Daniels decision in 2016 ruled that non-status Indians have the legal right to be considered "Indians" under Canada's Constitution of 1867, but as of October 2017 it was unclear what changes federal and provincial governments would make.

== Programs ==
The Helping Prepare for Employment/Education (HYPE) project announced in 2017 provided First Nations youth with employment workshops and work placement opportunities. The Council supports healthy eating programs.

The Collective Impact for Inclusive Youth Employment (CIIYE) was a two-year project, that ended in December 2023, that was funded by the Centre for Employment Innovation at the Coady Institute at St. Francis Xavier University. It was a project that provided pre-employment training, work placements in Nova Scotia businesses and organizations, and supported both the client and their employer in creating a safer, more inclusive and culturally sensitive work environment.

== Politics ==
The Council are opposed to hydraulic fracturing for oil and gas. Following the Daniels ruling, the Council are pressing both levels of government to negotiate tangible changes in access to social services, education, health care, and entitlements to commercial fishing.
