= Tony Belcourt =

Canadian activist

Tony Belcourt OC

1st President of the Métis Nation of Ontario (MNO)
- In office 1993–2008
- Preceded by: Office established
- Succeeded by: Gary Lipinski

1st President of the Native Council of Canada (NCC)
- In office 1971–1974
- Preceded by: Office established
- Succeeded by: Kermit Moore

Personal details
- Born: May 11, 1943 (age 83) Lac St. Anne, Alberta, Canada
- Domestic partner: Sandra Ames
- Children: Christi Belcourt, Shane Belcourt, Suzanne Belcourt
- Occupation: Indigenous Advocate
- Known for: Indigenous Knowledge Keeper
- Nickname: Makwa Gaa Nii Gaa Nich (The Bear that Leads)

Anthony Belcourt OC (born May 11, 1943) is a Métis rights leader and activist in Canada. He was the first president of the Native Council of Canada (1971–1974). He is best known for his work as the founding president of the Métis Nation of Ontario in 1993 and his leadership through the Powley Case in 2003.

== Biography ==
Belcourt was born in the Métis community of Lac Ste. Anne, Alberta. His career as a Métis leader in Canada spans four decades and continues to have a positive influence for Métis, other Aboriginal nations across Canada and Indigenous peoples worldwide.

Belcourt was elected vice-president of the Métis Association of Alberta in 1969. In the fall of 1970 he was instrumental in the forming of the Native Council of Canada (NCC) and served as its founding president from 1971 to 1974.

In his time as the president of the Native Council of Canada, Belcourt was successful in convincing the federal government to include Métis and Non-Status organizations in their newly announced core-funding program, which, up to that point, was exclusively for Status Indians.

In addition to assisting in the development of other Métis and Non-Status organizations throughout Canada, helped create a national voice for Canada's Métis and Non-Status Indian people.

As well, in 1973, Belcourt successfully lobbied the Canada Mortgage and Housing Corporation to put into place the "Rural and Native Housing Program"—a program with goals to build 50,000 new homes in five years. In addition, a $1 million program for emergency repair and residential rehabilitation that would improve the housing conditions of Métis and Non-Status peoples was also negotiated. During his time as NCC President, Belcourt was the Executive Producer of an award-winning film (Moccasin Flats) that was featured on CTV's Canada Day programming.

In the mid-1970s, Belcourt operated a research company and began his career as a writer, producer and director in film, video, and radio production. From 1977 to 1981, he was Communications Director at the Department of Indian and Northern Affairs through the federal Executive Interchange Program. Shortly after returning to the private sector, Belcourt formed Wolfwalker Communications that went on to produce many documentary programs directed to Aboriginal audiences.

During the round of talks leading to patriation of Canada's Constitution in 1981, Belcourt was an advisor to the Native Council of Canada and the Inuit Committee on National Issues. In the fall of 1981, when the section on Aboriginal matters and the equality clause were dropped from the proposed patriated constitution, Belcourt co-chaired a massive “Aboriginal Rights Coalition” of First Nations, Métis and Inuit leadership who came together to lobby for the reinstatement of the Aboriginal rights clause. The lobby was successful with the inclusion of the present S.35 of the Constitution Act, 1982.

In 1985, Belcourt served as the chairman of the Native Business Summit, a week-long extravaganza that occupied almost the entire Metro Toronto Convention Centre. This Summit was the first of its kind and raised the profile of Native businesses to an unprecedented level in Canada and throughout the world. The Summit consisted of five conferences running simultaneously, a trade show, an art gallery, and a gala of Aboriginal entertainment throughout. Attended by 2,000 delegates from nine countries, Princess Anne, along with Elder Rufus Goodstriker, opened the ceremonies and the Summit to business. The conferences, which saw the participation of CEOs from numerous Fortune 500 companies and the cream of Aboriginal business in Canada, resulted in $81 million worth of trade for Native business in one week.

In the late 1980s and early 1990s, Belcourt served as an advisor and consultant to Yvon Dumont, then president of the Métis National Council, lobbying the federal government for the recognition of Métis rights.

In 1992, Belcourt was given the privilege by the Rt. Hon. Joe Clark, of drafting the all-party resolution of the House of Commons which gave a long deserved recognition to Louis Riel and his contributions to Canada.

In 1993, Belcourt was instrumental in the formation of the Métis Nation of Ontario and since 1994 he has served as the founding president and was re-elected to that position in 1996, 1999, 2002 and 2005. In 2008 he retired from active Métis politics and did not seek re-election.

The growth of the MNO to this date is impressive. The foundations for Métis governance were developed and approved. The Métis Nation Registry; the MNO Electoral Code, providing for province-wide ballot box elections; the elected councils for Métis women, Métis youth and Métis veterans; the MNO Harvesting Policy, and its regime of Captains of the Hunt; the MNO Development Corporation and the Métis Nation of Ontario Cultural Commission are all institutions that have earned the respect that has gained the MNO its legitimacy. The creation of endowment funds for Métis bursaries and scholarships at 32 Ontario universities and colleges throughout the province—now topping $4.4 million sets the MNO apart as one of the largest, if not the largest, private sector provider of bursaries and scholarships in Ontario. The MNO also serves as an effective delivery agent of various programs for Métis people, including employment and training programs, long-term care and various health programs, housing and economic development.

Belcourt has been keenly involved in numerous actions for the recognition of Métis rights, including the landmark Powley case concerning the Métis right to hunt. On September 19, 2003, the Supreme Court of Canada ruled that the Métis have a constitutionally protected Aboriginal right to harvest. This watershed victory in favour of Métis rights will be a lasting legacy for the Métis Nation of Ontario.

Belcourt's work at the provincial level is complemented by an equally determined effort at the national and international levels. He was a member of the Métis National Council's board of governors and served for many years as the MNC's minister responsible for international affairs. Belcourt's role as minister responsible for international affairs and as Métis Nation Ambassador was supported financially by the federal minister of external affairs and international trade. The role brought him to United Nations meetings and negotiations on the UN Declaration on the Rights of Indigenous Peoples at the UN in Geneva and New York. He has also represented the Métis Nation at various UN conferences in South Africa and other parts of the western hemisphere.

His responsibilities included representing the Métis Nation within the Organization of American States (OAS) where he was involved in talks concerning the Americas’ Declaration on the Rights of Indigenous Peoples and the proposed Free Trade Area of the Americas. It is a position that enabled Belcourt to establish an effective presence for his work in helping other Indigenous peoples in Central and South America by promoting partnerships between the Métis Nation and Indigenous peoples in the northern hemisphere of the Americas. Belcourt's work extended to the development of an Indigenous policy for the Inter-American Development Bank. The MNO has developed a nation-to-nation protocol with the Aymara Nation whose territory spans southern Peru, Bolivia, northern Argentina and northern Chile. Over the past decade, Belcourt has developed a strong relationship with the Q’eqchi Maya in Guatemala.

These hemispheric relationships have led to discussions on trade and the projects involving Information and Communication Technologies (ICT). In 2007, Belcourt was elected president of the newly founded Indigenous Commission for Communications Technologies in the Americas (ICCTA). The purpose of the commission, made up of Indigenous representatives from 17 countries of North, Central, South America and the Caribbean was to promote the appropriate use and development of information and communications technologies to strengthen the recovery of the roots of the Indigenous peoples of the Americas and their legal, political, social, educational, cultural, spiritual and economic well-being.

Belcourt was a member of the Governing Council of Trent University's Ph.D. program in Native Studies, the first such degree program at any university in Canada. He was a patron of the Diana Fowler LeBlanc Aboriginal Social Work Scholarship. He was co-chair of the Aboriginal Advisory Council at the Ontario College of Art and Design University (OCADU) and was appointed to its board of governors in 2012. In January 2006, he received a National Aboriginal Achievement Award Indspire for public service. In 2010 he was awarded an Honorary Doctorate in Laws by Lakehead University. In 2013 he was appointed by the governor general of Canada to as an Officer of the Order of Canada.

Belcourt was president of the Métis Nation of Ontario Development Corporation, (MNODC) a wholly owned subsidiary of the MNO.

Belcourt was chair of the Métis Nation of Ontario Cultural Commission, a charitable organization dedicated to preserve and promote Métis history, values, traditions and pride in Métis arts and culture. He was also a member of the Crossing Boundaries National Council, which is composed of senior public servants and elected representatives from each of the provinces and the federal government, as well as representatives from territorial and municipal governments and the Aboriginal community. Through its projects and national discussions, the council acted as an agent of change for transformation towards a more citizen-centred government.

Belcourt is the father of Métis painter Christi Belcourt, graphic designer Suzanne Belcourt, and filmmaker Shane Belcourt.
