= National Aboriginal Health Organization =

Former Canadian not-for-profit organization

The National Aboriginal Health Organization (NAHO) (French: Organisation nationale de la santé autochtone (ONSA), Inuktitut: ᑲᓇᑕᒥ ᓄᓇᖃᖅᑳᖅᓯᒪᔪᓄᑦ ᐋᓐᓂᐊᕐᓇᖕᒋᓐᓂᓕᕆᓂᕐᒧᑦ ᑲᑐᔾᔨᕐᑲᑎᖐᑦ) was an Aboriginal-designed and -controlled not-for-profit body in Canada that worked to influence and advance the health and well-being of Aboriginal Peoples. The organization's funding was eliminated as part of the 2012 Canadian federal budget and NAHO ceased operations on June 30, 2012.

Incorporated in 2000, NAHO received core funding from Health Canada to undertake knowledge-based activities such as education, research and knowledge dissemination. With Aboriginal communities as its primary focus, NAHO used both traditional Aboriginal and contemporary Western healing and wellness approaches.

NAHO defined "Aboriginal Peoples" using the Canadian Constitution Act, 1982, sections 25 and 35, to consist of three groups – Indian (First Nations), Inuit, and Métis.

Its main objectives were to improve and promote Aboriginal health, understanding of health issues affecting Aboriginal Peoples and research, foster participation of Aboriginal Peoples in delivery of health care, and affirm and protect Aboriginal traditional healing practices.

== Structure ==
NAHO was governed by a Board of Directors made up of 13 directors, 8 of which were appointed by: Congress of Aboriginal Peoples, Inuit Tapiriit Kanatami, the Métis National Council, and Native Women's Association of Canada. An additional five board members were elected by the 10 appointed board members.

NAHO was subdivided into three centres – the First Nations Centre, the Inuit Tuttarvingat (formerly known as the Ajunnginiq Centre), and the Métis Centre. They advanced health and well-being by focusing on the distinct needs of their respective populations and promoting culturally relevant approaches to health care.

== Activities ==
NAHO had a number of projects that addressed Aboriginal health care issues including suicide prevention, healthy living, midwifery, and traditional health and healing. It also publishes research on its Web site, and presents at a number of conferences related to Aboriginal health.

== Journal of Aboriginal Health ==
The Journal of Aboriginal Health is a peer-reviewed open-access medical journal on Aboriginal health published by the National Aboriginal Health Organization of Canada. It was established in 2004 and publishes original research, editorials, and suggestions for further reading. Each issue of the journal has a guest editor who solicits appropriate papers from a variety of perspectives.

== See also ==
- Indian Health Transfer Policy (Canada)
- Canada Health Act
- Canada Health Transfer
- Canada Health and Social Transfer
- First Nations and diabetes
- Health care in Canada
- Royal Commission on the Future of Health Care in Canada
- The Canadian Crown and Aboriginal peoples
- Indian Act
