= AlterNative =

- Discipline: Indigenous studies
- Language: English, with occasional articles published in their original language
- Edited by: Tracey McIntosh, Michael Walker

Publication details
- History: 2005–present
- Publisher: Ngā Pae o te Māramatanga (University of Auckland) (New Zealand)
- Frequency: Quarterly

Standard abbreviations
- ISO 4: AlterNative

Indexing
- ISSN: 1177-1801 (print); 1174-1740 (web)
- OCLC no.: 402781942

Links
- Journal homepage; Online archive

AlterNative: An International Journal of Indigenous Peoples (formerly AlterNative: An International Journal of Indigenous Scholarship) is a quarterly peer-reviewed academic journal published by Ngā Pae o te Māramatanga, New Zealand's Indigenous Centre of Research Excellence (University of Auckland). It covers indigenous studies and scholarly research from indigenous perspectives from around the world. The journal was established in 2005 and the editors-in-chief are listed in 2021 as Dr Tracey McIntosh and Dr Carwyn Jones (Victoria University of Wellington Te Herenga Waka).

Tracey McIntosh (University of Auckland) is also a Director at Ngā Pae o te Māramatangā.
