= American Indian Quarterly =

- Discipline: American Indian studies
- Language: English
- Edited by: Lindsey Claire Smith

Publication details
- History: 1974-present
- Publisher: University of Nebraska Press (United States)
- Frequency: Quarterly

Standard abbreviations
- ISO 4: Am. Indian Q.

Indexing
- CODEN: AIQUEW
- ISSN: 0095-182X (print); 1534-1828 (web)
- LCCN: 74647596
- JSTOR: 0095182X
- OCLC no.: 499289594

Links
- Journal homepage; Online access at Project MUSE

The American Indian Quarterly is a quarterly peer-reviewed academic journal covering studies on the indigenous peoples of North and South America. It is published by the University of Nebraska Press and was established in 1974. The editor-in-chief is Lindsey Claire Smith (Oklahoma State University).
