= Indigenous peoples in Canada =

Indigenous peoples in Canada; Peuples autochtones en Canada
- Proportion of Native Canadians in each census divisions as of the 2021 Canadian census

Total population
- 1,807,250 (2021 census); 5.0% of the Canadian population

Languages
- Indigenous languages, Indigenous English, Canadian English and Canadian French

Religion
- Christianity (mainly Roman Catholicism and Anglican), Traditional Indigenous beliefs, Inuit religion, Mythologies of the Indigenous peoples of the Americas

Related ethnic groups
- Native Americans in the United States, Greenlandic Inuit, Indigenous peoples of the Americas

In Canada, Indigenous peoples (also known as Aboriginal Canadians) represent roughly 5% of the overall population. They comprise the Inuit, Métis, and First Nations, of which there are over 600 recognized First Nations governments or bands with distinctive cultures, languages, music and arts.

Old Crow Flats and Bluefish Caves are some of the earliest known sites of human habitation in Canada. The characteristics of Indigenous cultures in Canada prior to European colonization included permanent settlements, possibly agriculture, civic and ceremonial architecture, complex societal hierarchies, and trading networks. Métis nations of mixed ancestry originated in the mid-17th century when First Nations and Inuit married Europeans, primarily French settlers. First Nations and Métis peoples played a critical part in the development of European colonies in Canada, particularly for their role in assisting Europeans during the North American fur trade.

Various Aboriginal laws, treaties, and legislation have been enacted between European immigrants and Indigenous groups across Canada. The impact of settler colonialism in Canada can be seen in its culture, history, politics, laws, and legislatures. Historically, this included assimilationist policies affecting Indigenous languages, traditions, religion and the degradation of Indigenous communities that has contemporarily been described by some, including academics and politicians, as a cultural genocide or genocide.

The modern Indigenous right to self-government provides for Indigenous self-government in Canada and the management of cultural, political, health and economic responsibilities within Indigenous communities. National Indigenous Peoples Day recognizes the vast cultures and contributions of Indigenous peoples to the history of Canada. First Nations, Inuit, and Métis peoples of all backgrounds have become prominent figures in Canada and have helped shape the Canadian cultural identity.

== Terminology ==
Indigenous peoples in Canada and the United States, % of population by area.

In Section 35 of the Constitution Act, 1982, "Aboriginal peoples of Canada" includes Indian, Inuit, and Métis peoples. "Aboriginal" as a collective noun is a specific term of art used as a legal term encompassing all Indigenous peoples living in Canada. Although "Indian" is a term still commonly used in legal documents for First Nations, the descriptors "Indian" and "Eskimo" have fallen into disuse in Canada; most consider them to be pejorative. Indian remains in place as the legal term used in the Canadian Constitution. (Note: Indian is used here because of the historical nature of the article and the precision of the name, as with Indian hospital. It was, and continues to be, used by government officials, Indigenous peoples and historians while referencing the school system. The use of the name also provides relevant context about the era in which the system was established, specifically one in which Indigenous peoples in Canada were homogeneously referred to as Indians rather than by language that distinguishes First Nations, Inuit and Métis peoples. Use of Indian is limited throughout the article to proper nouns and references to government legislation.) Aboriginal peoples has begun to be considered outdated and is slowly being replaced by the term Indigenous peoples. (Note: The words Aboriginal and Indigenous are capitalized when used in a Canadian context.) There is also an effort to recognize each Indigenous group as a distinct nation, much as there are distinct European, African, and Asian cultures in their respective places.

First Nations (most often used in the plural) has come into general use since the 1970s, replacing Indians and Indian bands in everyday vocabulary. However, on Indian reserves, First Nations is being supplanted by members of various nations referring to themselves by their group or ethnic identity. In conversation, this would be "I am Haida", or "we are Kwantlens", in recognition of their First Nations ethnicities. Also coming into general use since the 1970s, First Peoples refers to all Indigenous groups, i.e. First Nations, Inuit, and Métis.

Notwithstanding Canada's location within the Americas, the term Native American is hardly ever used in Canada, in order to avoid any confusion due to the ambiguous meaning of the word "American". Therefore, the term is typically used only in reference to the Indigenous peoples within the boundaries of the present-day United States. Native Canadians was often used in Canada to differentiate this American term until the 1980s.

In contrast to the more-specific Aboriginal, one of the issues with the term native is its general applicability: in certain contexts, it could be used in reference to non-Indigenous peoples in regards to an individual place of origin / birth. For instance, people who were born or grew up in Calgary may call themselves "Calgary natives", as in they are native to that city. With this in mind, even the term native American, as another example, may very well indicate someone who is native to America rather than a person who is ethnically Indigenous to the boundaries of the present-day United States. In this sense, native may encompass a broad range of populations and is therefore not recommended, although it is not generally considered offensive.

The Indian Act (Revised Statutes of Canada (R.S.C.), 1985, c. I-5) sets the legal term Indian, designating that "a person who pursuant to this Act is registered as an Indian or is entitled to be registered as an Indian." Section 5 of the act states that a registry shall be maintained "in which shall be recorded the name of every person who is entitled to be registered as an Indian under this Act." No other term is legally recognized for the purpose of registration and the term Indian specifically excludes reference to Inuit as per section 4 of the act.

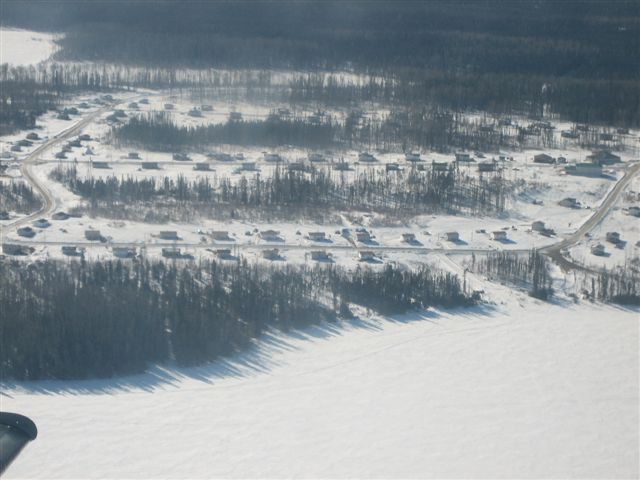
An Aboriginal community in Northern Ontario

The term Eskimo has pejorative connotations in Canada and Greenland. Indigenous peoples in those areas have replaced the term Eskimo with Inuit, though the Yupik of Alaska and Siberia do not consider themselves Inuit, and ethnographers agree they are a distinct people. They prefer the terminology Yupik, Yupiit, or Eskimo. The Yupik languages are linguistically distinct from the Inuit languages, but are related to each other. Linguistic groups of Arctic people have no universal replacement term for Eskimo, inclusive of all Inuit and Yupik across the geographical area inhabited by them.

Besides these ethnic descriptors, Aboriginal peoples are often divided into legal categories based on their relationship with the Crown (i.e. the state). Section 91(24) of the Constitution Act, 1867 gives the federal government (as opposed to the provinces) the sole responsibility for "Indians, and Lands reserved for the Indians." The government inherited treaty obligations from the British colonial authorities in Eastern Canada and signed treaties itself with First Nations in Western Canada (the Numbered Treaties). The Indian Act, passed by the federal Parliament in 1876, has long governed its interactions with all treaty and non-treaty peoples.

Members of First Nations bands who are subject to the Indian Act are compiled on a list called the Indian Register, and such people are designated as status Indians. Many non-treaty First Nations and all Inuit and Métis are not subject to the Indian Act. However, two court cases have clarified that Inuit, Métis, and non-status First Nations are all covered by the term Indians in the Constitution Act, 1867. The first was Reference Re Eskimos (1939), covering Inuit; the second was Daniels v. Canada (2013), which concerns Métis and non-status First Nations.

== History ==
=== Paleo-Indian period ===
Map of early human migrations based on the Out of Africa theory; figures are in thousands of years ago (kya)

According to North American archaeological and genetic evidence, migration to North and South America made them the last continents in the world with human habitation. During the Wisconsin glaciation, 50,000–17,000 years ago, falling sea levels allowed people to move across the Bering land bridge that joined Siberia to northwest North America (Alaska). Alaska was ice-free because of low snowfall, allowing a small population to exist. The Laurentide ice sheet covered most of Canada, blocking nomadic inhabitants and confining them to Alaska (East Beringia) for thousands of years.

Indigenous genetic studies suggest that the first inhabitants of the Americas share a single ancestral population, one that developed in isolation, conjectured to be Beringia. The isolation of these peoples in Beringia might have lasted 10,000–20,000 years. Around 16,500 years ago, the glaciers began melting, allowing people to move south and east into Canada and beyond.

The first inhabitants of North America arrived in Canada at least 14,000 years ago. It is believed the inhabitants entered the Americas pursuing Pleistocene mammals such as the giant beaver, steppe wisent (bison), muskox, mastodons, woolly mammoths and ancient reindeer (early caribou). One route hypothesized is that people walked south by way of an ice-free corridor on the east side of the Rocky Mountains, and then fanned out across North America before continuing on to South America. The other conjectured route is that they migrated, either on foot or using primitive boats, down the Pacific coast to the tip of South America, and then crossed the Rockies and Andes. Evidence of the latter has been covered by a sea level rise of hundreds of metres following the last ice age.

The Old Crow Flats and basin was one of the areas in Canada untouched by glaciations during the Pleistocene Ice ages, thus it served as a pathway and refuge for ice age plants and animals. The area holds evidence of early human habitation in Canada dating from about 12,000 years ago. Fossils from the area include some never accounted for in North America, such as hyenas and large camels. Bluefish Caves is an archaeological site in Yukon from which a specimen of apparently human-worked mammoth bone was radiocarbon dated to 12,000 years ago.

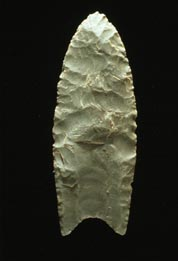
A Clovis point created using bi-facial percussion flaking (that is, each face is flaked on both edges alternatively with a percussor)

Clovis sites dated at 13,500 years ago were discovered in western North America during the 1930s. Clovis peoples were regarded as the first widespread Paleo-Indian inhabitants of the New World and ancestors to all Indigenous peoples in the Americas.

Localized regional cultures developed from the time of the Younger Dryas cold climate period from 12,900 to 11,500 years ago. The Folsom tradition is characterized by the use of Folsom points as projectile tips at archaeological sites. These tools assisted activities at kill sites that marked the slaughter and butchering of bison.

The land bridge existed until 13,000–11,000 years ago, long after the oldest proven human settlements in the New World began. Lower sea levels in the Queen Charlotte sound and Hecate Strait produced great grass lands called archipelago of Haida Gwaii. Hunter-gatherers of the area left distinctive lithic technology tools and the remains of large butchered mammals, occupying the area from 13,000–9,000 years ago. In July 1992, the Government of Canada officially designated X̱á:ytem (near Mission, British Columbia) as a national historic site, one of the first Indigenous spiritual sites in Canada to be formally recognized in this manner.

The Plano cultures was a group of hunter-gatherer communities that occupied the Great Plains area of North America between 10,000 and 8,000 years ago. The Paleo-Indians moved into new territory as it emerged from under the glaciers. Big game flourished in this new environment. The Plano culture is characterized by a range of projectile point tools collectively called Plano points, which were used to hunt bison. Their diets also included pronghorn, elk, deer, raccoon and coyote. At the beginning of the Archaic period, they began to adopt a sedentary approach to subsistence. Sites in and around Belmont, Nova Scotia, have evidence of Plano-Indians, indicating small seasonal hunting camps, perhaps re-visited over generations from around 11,000–10,000 years ago. Seasonal large and smaller game fish and fowl were food and raw material sources. Adaptation to the harsh environment included tailored clothing and skin-covered tents on wooden frames.

=== Archaic period ===
The North American climate stabilized by 8000 BCE (10,000 years ago); climatic conditions were very similar to today's. This led to widespread migration, cultivation and later a dramatic rise in population all over the Americas. Over the course of thousands of years, Indigenous peoples of the Americas domesticated, bred and cultivated a large array of plant species. These species now constitute 50–60% of all crops in cultivation worldwide.

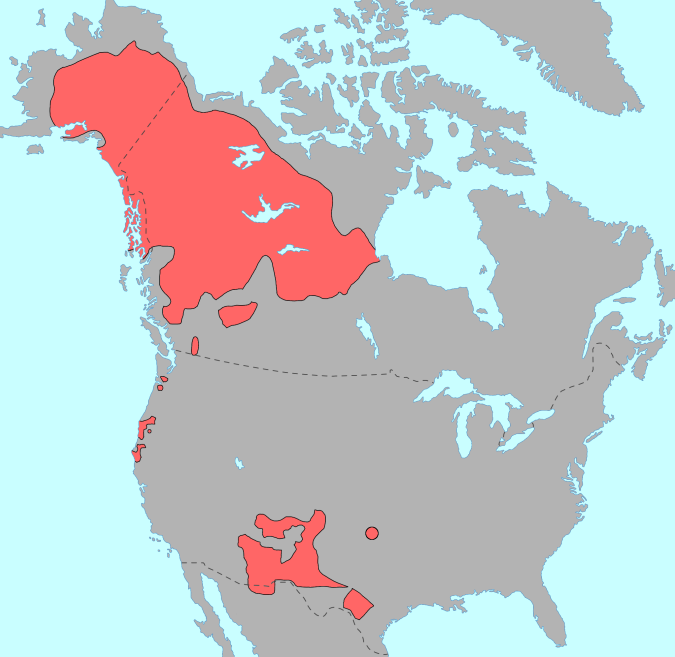
Distribution of Na-Dene languages shown in red

The vastness and variety of Canada's climates, ecology, vegetation, fauna, and landform separations have defined ancient peoples implicitly into cultural or linguistic divisions. Canada is surrounded north, east, and west with coastline and since the last ice age, Canada has consisted of distinct forest regions. Language contributes to the identity of a people by influencing social life ways and spiritual practices. Indigenous religions developed from anthropomorphism and animism philosophies.

The placement of artifacts and materials within an Archaic burial site indicated social differentiation based upon status. There is a continuous record of occupation of S'ólh Téméxw by Indigenous people dating from the early Holocene period, 10,000–9,000 years ago. Archaeological sites at Stave Lake, Coquitlam Lake, Fort Langley and region uncovered early period artifacts. These early inhabitants were highly mobile hunter-gatherers, consisting of about 20 to 50 members of an extended family. The Na-Dene people occupied much of the land area of northwest and central North America starting around 8,000 BCE. They were the earliest ancestors of the Athabaskan-speaking peoples, including the Navajo and Apache. They had villages with large multi-family dwellings, used seasonally during the summer, from which they hunted, fished and gathered food supplies for the winter. The Wendat peoples settled into Southern Ontario along the Eramosa River around 8,000–7,000 BCE (10,000–9,000 years ago). They were concentrated between Lake Simcoe and Georgian Bay. Wendat hunted caribou to survive on the glacier-covered land. Many different First Nations cultures relied upon the buffalo starting by 6,000–5,000 BCE (8,000–7,000 years ago). They hunted buffalo by herding migrating buffalo off cliffs. Head-Smashed-In Buffalo Jump, near Fort Macleod, Alberta, is a hunting grounds that was in use for about 5,000 years.

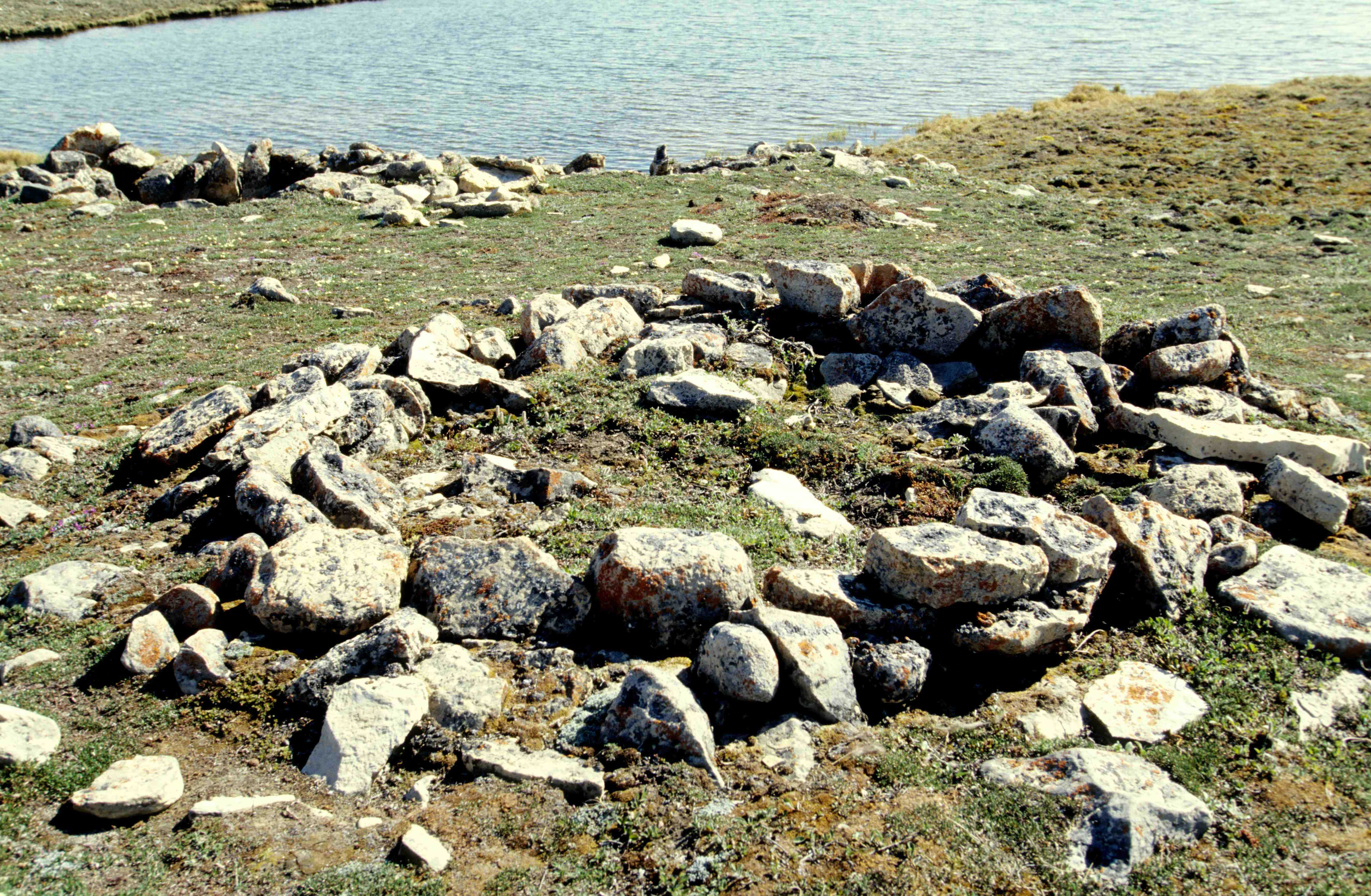
Thule site (Copper Inuit) near the waters of Cambridge Bay (Victoria Island)

By 7,000–5000 BCE (9,000–7,000 years ago) the west coast of Canada saw various cultures who organized themselves around salmon fishing. The Nuu-chah-nulth of Vancouver Island began whaling with advanced long spears at about this time. The Maritime Archaic is one group of North America's Archaic culture of sea-mammal hunters in the subarctic. They prospered from approximately 7,000 BCE–1,500 BCE (9,000–3,500 years ago) along the Atlantic Coast of North America. Their settlements included longhouses and boat-topped temporary or seasonal houses. They engaged in long-distance trade, using as currency white chert, a rock quarried from northern Labrador to Maine. The Pre-Columbian culture, whose members were called Red Paint People, is indigenous to the New England and Atlantic Canada regions of North America. The culture flourished between 3,000 BCE – 1,000 BCE (5,000–3,000 years ago) and was named after their burial ceremonies, which used large quantities of red ochre to cover bodies and grave goods.

The Arctic small tool tradition is a broad cultural entity that developed along the Alaska Peninsula, around Bristol Bay, and on the eastern shores of the Bering Strait around 2,500 BCE (4,500 years ago). These Paleo-Arctic peoples had a highly distinctive toolkit of small blades (microblades) that were pointed at both ends and used as side- or end-barbs on arrows or spears made of other materials, such as bone or antler. Scrapers, engraving tools and adze blades were also included in their toolkits. The Arctic small tool tradition branches off into two cultural variants, including the Pre-Dorset, and the Independence traditions, ancestors of the Thule people, and Inuit displaced these two groups by 1000 CE.

=== Post-Archaic periods ===
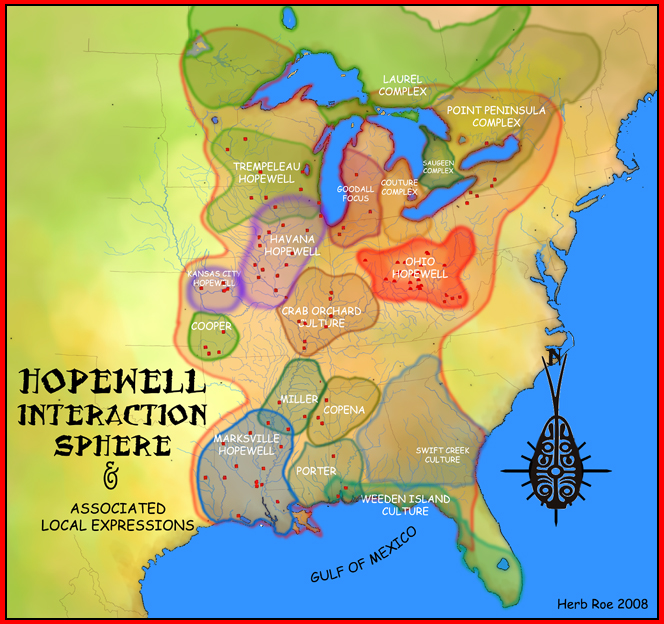
Great Lakes area of the Hopewell Interaction Area:
PP=Point Peninsula complex
S=Saugeen complex
L=Laurel complex

The Old Copper complex societies dating from 3,000 BCE – 500 BCE (5,000–2,500 years ago) are a manifestation of the Woodland culture, and are pre-pottery in nature. Evidence found in the northern Great Lakes regions indicates that they extracted copper from local glacial deposits and used it in its natural form to manufacture tools and implements.

The Woodland cultural period dates from about 1,000 BCE – 1,000 CE, and has locales in Ontario, Quebec, and Maritime regions. The introduction of pottery distinguishes the Woodland culture from the earlier Archaic stage inhabitants. Laurentian people of southern Ontario manufactured the oldest pottery excavated to date in Canada. They created pointed-bottom beakers decorated by a cord marking technique that involved impressing tooth implements into wet clay. Woodland technology included items such as beaver incisor knives, bangles, and chisels. The population practising sedentary agricultural life ways continued to increase on a diet of squash, corn, and bean crops.

The Hopewell tradition is an Indigenous culture that flourished along American rivers from 300 BCE – 500 CE. At its greatest extent, the Hopewell Exchange System networked cultures and societies with the peoples on the Canadian shores of Lake Ontario. Canadian expression of the Hopewellian peoples encompasses the Point Peninsula, Saugeen, and Laurel complexes.

==== First Nations ====
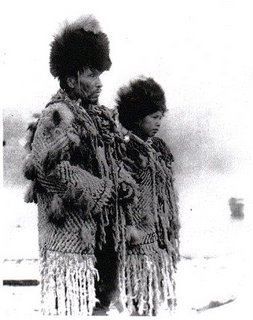
Chief George from the village of Senakw with his daughter in traditional regalia, c. 1906

First Nations peoples had settled and established trade routes across what is now Canada by 500 BCE – 1,000 CE. Communities developed each with its own culture, customs, and character. In the northwest are the Athapaskan speaking, Slavey, Tłı̨chǫ, Tutchone, and Tlingit. Along the Pacific coast are the Tsimshian; Haida; Coast Salish; Kwakwakaʼwakw; Heiltsuk; Nootka; Nisga'a; Senakw and Gitxsan. In the Plains are the Niisitapi; Káínawa; Tsuutʼina; and Piikáni. In the Northern Woodlands are the Cree and Chipewyan. Around the Great Lakes are the Anishinaabe; Algonquin; Haudenosaunee and Wendat. Along the Atlantic Coast are the Wolastoqiyik, Innu, Abenaki, and Mi'kmaq and formerly the Beothuk.

Many First Nations civilizations established characteristics and hallmarks that included permanent urban settlements or cities, agriculture, civic and monumental architecture, and complex societal hierarchies. These cultures had evolved and changed by the time of the first permanent European arrivals (c. late 15th–early 16th centuries), and have been brought forward through archaeological investigations.

There are indications of contact made before Christopher Columbus between the first peoples and those from other continents. Indigenous people in Canada first interacted with Europeans around 1000 CE, but prolonged contact came after Europeans established permanent settlements in the 17th and 18th centuries. European written accounts generally recorded friendliness of the First Nations, who profited in trade with Europeans. Such trade generally strengthened the more organized political entities such as the Iroquois Confederation. Throughout the 16th century, European fleets made almost annual visits to the eastern shores of Canada to cultivate the fishing opportunities. A sideline industry emerged in the un-organized traffic of furs overseen by the British Indian Department.

Prominent First Nations people include Joe Capilano, who met with King of the United Kingdom, Edward VII, to speak of the need to settle land claims and Ovide Mercredi, a leader at both the Meech Lake Accord constitutional reform discussions and Oka Crisis.

==== Inuit ====
Inuit are the descendants of what anthropologists call the Thule culture, which emerged from western Alaska around 1,000 CE and spread eastward across the Arctic, displacing the Dorset culture (in Inuktitut, the Tuniit). Inuit historically referred to the Tuniit as "giants", who were taller and stronger than the Inuit. Researchers hypothesize that the Dorset culture lacked dogs, larger weapons and other technologies used by the expanding Inuit society. By 1300, Inuit had settled in west Greenland, and finally moved into east Greenland over the following century. The Inuit had trade routes with more southern cultures. Boundary disputes were common and led to aggressive actions.

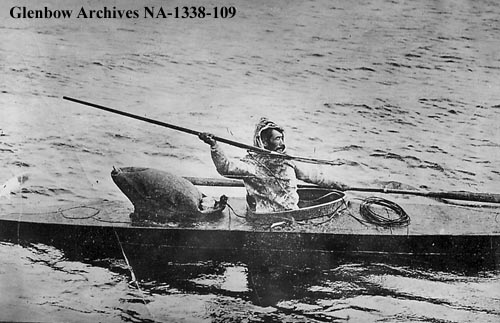
Inuk in a kayak, c. 1908–1914

Warfare was common among Inuit groups with sufficient population density. Inuit, such as the Nunamiut (Uummarmiut) who inhabited the Mackenzie River delta area, often engaged in common warfare. The Central Arctic Inuit lacked the population density to engage in warfare. In the 13th century, the Thule culture began arriving in Greenland from what is now Canada. Norse accounts are scant. Norse-made items from Inuit campsites in Greenland were obtained by either trade or plunder. One account, Ívar Bárðarson, speaks of "small people" with whom the Norsemen fought. 14th-century accounts relate that a western settlement, one of the two Norse settlements, was taken over by the Skræling.

After the disappearance of the Norse colonies in Greenland, the Inuit had no contact with Europeans for at least a century. By the mid-16th century, Basque fishers were already working the Labrador coast and had established whaling stations on land, such as those excavated at Red Bay. The Inuit appear not to have interfered with their operations, but they did raid the stations in winter for tools, and particularly worked iron, which they adapted to native needs.

Notable among the Inuit are Abraham Ulrikab and family who became a zoo exhibit in Hamburg, Germany, and Tanya Tagaq, a traditional throat singer. Abe Okpik was instrumental in helping Inuit obtain surnames rather than disc numbers and Kiviaq (David Ward) won the legal right to use his single-word Inuktitut name.

==== Métis ====
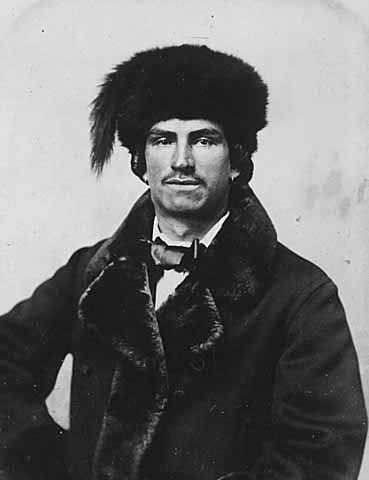
Mixed-blood fur trader, c. 1870

The Métis are people descended from marriages between Europeans (mainly French) and Cree, Ojibwe, Algonquin, Saulteaux, Menominee, Mi'kmaq, Maliseet, and other First Nations. Their history dates to the mid-17th century.

When Europeans first arrived to Canada they relied on Indigenous peoples for fur trading skills and survival. To ensure alliances, relationships between European fur traders and Indigenous women were often consolidated through marriage. The Métis homeland consists of the Canadian provinces of British Columbia, Alberta, Saskatchewan, Manitoba, and Ontario, as well as the Northwest Territories (NWT).

Amongst notable Métis people are singer and actor Tom Jackson, Commissioner of the Northwest Territories Tony Whitford, and Louis Riel who led two resistance movements: the Red River Rebellion of 1869–1870 and the North-West Rebellion of 1885, which ended in his trial and subsequent execution.

The languages inherently Métis are either Métis French or a mixed language called Michif. Michif, Mechif or Métchif is a phonetic spelling of Métif, a variant of Métis. The Métis today predominantly speak English, with French a strong second language, as well as numerous Indigenous tongues. A 19th-century community of the Métis people, the Anglo-Métis, were referred to as Countryborn. They were children of Rupert's Land fur trade typically of Orcadian, Scottish, or English paternal descent and Indigenous maternal descent. Their first languages would have been Indigenous (Cree, Saulteaux, Assiniboine, etc.) and English. Their fathers often spoke Gaelic or the Orcadian dialect, thus leading to the development of an English dialect referred to as "Bungi".

S.35 of the Constitution Act, 1982 mentions the Métis yet there has long been debate over legally defining the term Métis, but on September 23, 2003, the Supreme Court of Canada ruled that Métis are a distinct people with significant rights (Powley ruling).

Unlike First Nations people, there has been no distinction between status and non-status Métis; the Métis, their heritage and Indigenous ancestry have often been absorbed and assimilated into their surrounding populations.

=== Forced assimilation ===
From the late 18th century, European Canadians (and the Canadian government) encouraged assimilation of Indigenous culture into what was referred to as "Canadian culture." These attempts reached a climax in the late 19th and early 20th centuries, with a series of initiatives that aimed at complete assimilation and subjugation of the Indigenous peoples. These policies, which were made possible by legislation such as the Gradual Civilization Act and the Indian Act, focused on European ideals of Christianity, sedentary living, agriculture, and education.

==== Christianization ====
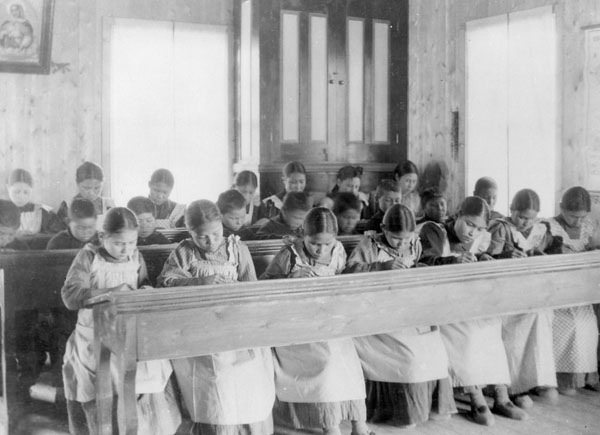
Study period at a Roman Catholic Indian Residential School in Fort Resolution, NWT

Missionary work directed at the Indigenous people of Canada had been ongoing since the first missionaries arrived in the 1600s, generally from France, some of whom were martyred (Jesuit saints called the Canadian Martyrs). Christianization as government policy became more systematic with the Indian Act in 1876, which would bring new sanctions for those who did not convert to Christianity. For example, the new laws would prevent non-Christian Indigenous people from testifying or having their cases heard in court, and ban alcohol consumption. When the Indian Act was amended in 1884, traditional religious and social practices, such as the Potlatch, would be banned, and further amendments in 1920 would prevent "status Indians" (as defined in the Act) from wearing traditional dress or performing traditional dances in an attempt to stop all non-Christian practices.

==== Sedentary living, reserves, and "gradual civilization" ====
Another focus of the Canadian government was to make the Indigenous groups of Canada sedentary, as they thought that this would make them easier to assimilate. In the 19th century, the government began to support the creation of model farming villages, which were meant to encourage non-sedentary Indigenous groups to settle in an area and begin to cultivate agriculture. When most of these model farming villages failed, the government turned instead to the creation of Indian reserves with the Indian Act of 1876. With the creation of these reserves came many restricting laws, such as further bans on all intoxicants, restrictions on eligibility to vote in band elections, decreased hunting and fishing areas, and inability for status Indians to visit other groups on their reserves. Farming was still seen as an important practice for assimilation on reserves; however, by the late 19th century the government had instituted restrictive policies here too, such as the Peasant Farm Policy, which restricted reserve farmers largely to the use of hand tools. This was implemented largely to limit the competitiveness of First Nations farming.

Through the Gradual Civilization Act in 1857, the government would encourage Indians (i.e., First Nations) to enfranchise – to remove all legal distinctions between [Indians] and Her Majesty's other Canadian Subjects. If an Indigenous chose to enfranchise, it would strip them and their family of Aboriginal title, with the idea that they would become "less savage" and "more civilized," thus become assimilated into Canadian society. However, they were often still defined as non-citizens by Europeans, and those few who did enfranchise were often met with disappointment.

==== Residential system ====
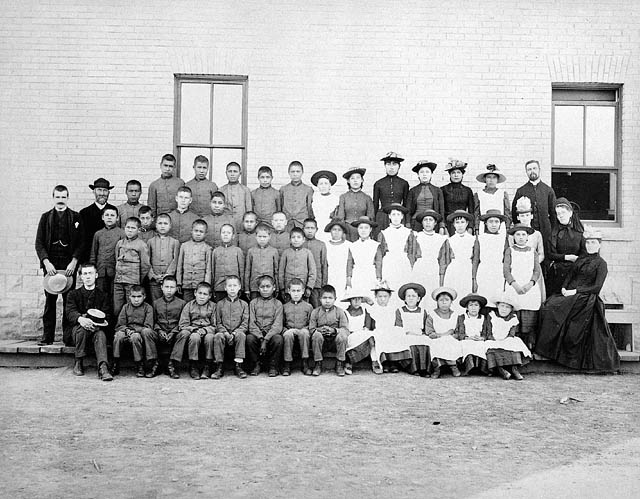
St. Paul's Indian Industrial School, Middlechurch, Manitoba, 1901

The final government strategy of assimilation, made possible by the Indian Act was the Canadian residential school system:

Of all the initiatives that were undertaken in the first century of Confederation, none was more ambitious or central to the civilizing strategy of the Department, to its goal of assimilation than the residential school system… it was the residential school experience that would lead children most effectively out of their "savage" communities into "higher civilization" and "full citizenship."

Beginning in 1874 and lasting until 1996, the Canadian government, in partnership with the dominant Christian Churches, ran 130 residential boarding schools across Canada for Indigenous children. Sometimes school attendance was forced. While the schools provided some education, they were plagued by under-funding, disease, and abuse.

According to some scholars, the Canadian government's laws and policies, including the residential school system, that encouraged or required Indigenous peoples to assimilate into a Eurocentric society, violated the United Nations Genocide Convention that Canada signed in 1949 and passed through Parliament in 1952. Therefore, these scholars believe that Canada could be tried in international court for genocide. A legal case resulted in settlement of CA$2 billion in 2006 and the 2008 establishment of the Truth and Reconciliation Commission, which confirmed the injurious effect on children of this system and turmoil created between Indigenous peoples and non-Indigenous peoples. In 2008, Prime Minister Stephen Harper issued an apology on behalf of the Canadian government and its citizens for the residential school system.

== Politics, law, and legislation ==
=== Indigenous law vs. Aboriginal law ===
The term Canadian Indigenous law refers to Indigenous peoples' own legal systems. This includes the laws and legal processes developed by Indigenous groups to govern their relationships, manage their natural resources, and manage conflicts. Indigenous law is developed from a variety of sources and institutions, which differ across legal traditions. Canadian Aboriginal law is the area of law related to the Canadian government's relationship with the Indigenous peoples. Section 91(24) of the Constitution Act, 1867 gives the federal parliament exclusive power to legislate in matters related to Aboriginals, which includes groups governed by the Indian Act, different Numbered Treaties and outside of those acts.

=== Treaties ===
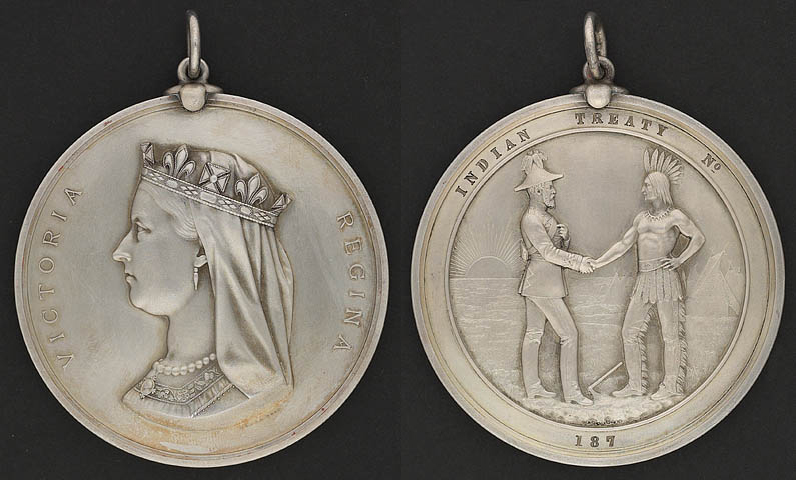
The Indian Chiefs Medal, presented to commemorate Treaties 3, 4, 5, 6 and 7, bearing the image of Queen Victoria

The Monarchy of Canada and the Indigenous peoples of Canada began interactions in North America during the European colonization period. The Royal Proclamation of 1763 recognized Indigenous title and the Treaty of Niagara of 1764 bound the Crown and the Indigenous peoples of the Great Lakes basin together in a familial relationship, a relationship that exists to this day, exemplified by First Nations attendance at the coronation of King Charles III. Post-Confederation Canada adopted a paternalistic approach and imposed an approach as though the nation-to-nation relationship did not exist, administering relations solely under Canadian law.

After Canada's acquisition of Rupert's Land and the North-Western Territory in 1870, the eleven Numbered Treaties were imposed on the First Nations from 1871 to 1921. These treaties are agreements with the Crown administered by Canadian Aboriginal law and overseen by the Minister of Crown–Indigenous Relations.

Treaty rights would be recognized and incorporated into the 1982 Constitution. Many agreements signed before the Confederation of Canada are recognized in Canadian law, such as the Peace and Friendship Treaties, the Robinson Treaties, the Douglas Treaties, and many others, although many First Nations still have no treaty with the Crown recognizing their title, such as the Mikmaq, the Anishnaabe and several northern British Columbia nations.

For many years, Canada did not negotiate with First Nations to address their aboriginal title. Canadian court judgments and political pressure led to a change in ways following the Canadian Centennial year. The first treaty implemented under the new framework was the James Bay and Northern Quebec Agreement in 1970 between the Cree and Quebec. This was followed by the Inuvialuit Final Agreement in 1984 that led to the creation of the Inuvialuit Settlement Region. The Nunavut Land Claims Agreement of 1993 lead to the creation of the Inuit-majority territory of Nunavut later that decade. The Canadian Crown continues to sign new treaties with Indigenous peoples, notably though the British Columbia Treaty Process.

According to the First Nations–Federal Crown Political Accord, "cooperation will be a cornerstone for partnership between Canada and First Nations, wherein Canada is the short-form reference to Her Majesty the Queen in Right of Canada. The Supreme Court of Canada argued that treaties "served to reconcile pre-existing Indigenous sovereignty with assumed Crown sovereignty, and to define Aboriginal rights." First Nations interpreted agreements covered in Treaty 8 to last "as long as the sun shines, grass grows and rivers flow." However, the Canadian government has frequently breached the Crown's treaty obligations over the years, and tries to address these issues by negotiating specific land claim.

=== Indian Act ===
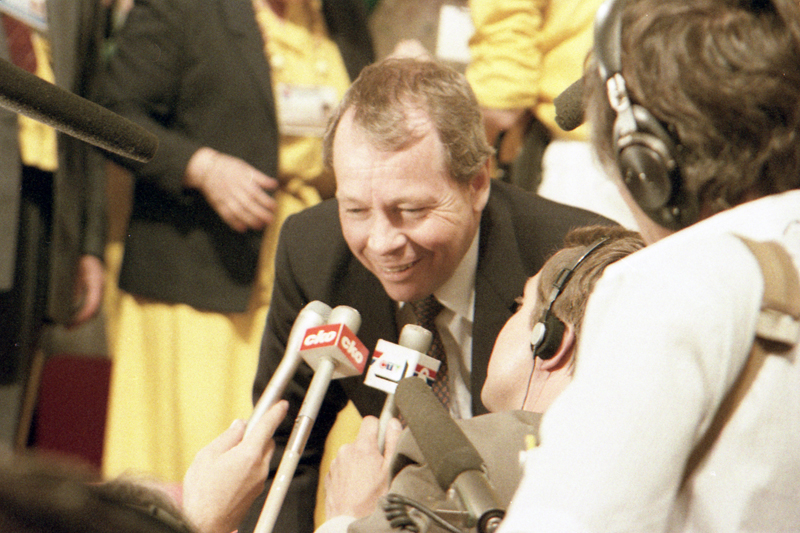
Former federal Indian affairs minister David Crombie was responsible for Bill C-31.

The Indian Act is Canadian law that dates from 1876. The Act replaced pre-Confederation Canadian laws, and was intended to administer the Indigenous people, and define Canadian interactions. Successive Canadian governments used its powers to impose conditions on the First Nations, and guide their integration into Canada. Today still, the Indian Act indicates how reserves and bands can operate and defines who is recognized as an "Indian." There have been many updates to this law since then, allowing Canadian citizenship and voting rights among others.

In 1985, the Canadian Parliament passed Bill C-31, An Act to Amend the Indian Act. Because of a constitutional requirement, the bill took effect on April 17, 1985.

- It ends discriminatory provisions of the Indian Act, especially those that discriminated against women.
- It changes the meaning of status and for the first time allows for limited reinstatement of Indians who were denied or lost status or band membership.
- It allows bands to define their own membership rules.

Those people accepted into band membership under band rules may not be status Indians. C-31 clarified that various sections of the Indian Act apply to band members. The sections under debate concern community life and land holdings. Sections pertaining to Indians (First Nations peoples) as individuals (in this case, wills and taxation of personal property) were not included.

=== Royal Commission ===
Map with areas labelled where the Truth and Reconciliation Commission of Canada took part in outreach and statement gathering events over the impact of Canadian residential schools with the Indigenous peoples of Canada

The Royal Commission on Aboriginal Peoples was a royal commission undertaken by the Government of Canada in 1991 to address issues of the Indigenous peoples of Canada. It assessed past government policies toward Indigenous people, such as residential schools, and provided policy recommendations to the government. The Commission issued its final report in November 1996. The five-volume, 4,000-page report covered a vast range of issues; its 440 recommendations called for sweeping changes to the interaction between Indigenous, non-Indigenous people and the governments in Canada. The report "set out a 20-year agenda for change."

=== Health policy ===
In 1995, the Government of Canada announced the Aboriginal Right to Self-Government Policy. This policy recognizes that First Nations and Inuit have the constitutional right to shape their own forms of government to suit their particular historical, cultural, political and economic circumstances. The Indian Health Transfer Policy provided a framework for the assumption of control of health services by Indigenous peoples, and set forth a developmental approach to transfer centred on self-determination in health. Through this process, the decision to enter transfer discussions with Health Canada rests with each community. Once involved in transfer, communities can take control of health programme responsibilities at a pace determined by their individual circumstances and health management capabilities. The National Aboriginal Health Organization (NAHO) incorporated in 2000, was an Indigenous -designed and-controlled not-for-profit body in Canada that worked to influence and advance the health and well-being of Indigenous Peoples. Its funding was discontinued in 2012.

=== Political organization ===
First Nations and Inuit organizations ranged in size from band societies of a few people to multi-nation confederacies like the Iroquois. First Nations leaders from across the country formed the Assembly of First Nations, which began as the National Indian Brotherhood in 1968. Métis and Inuit are represented nationally by the Métis National Council and Inuit Tapiriit Kanatami respectively.

Today's political organizations have resulted from interaction with European-style methods of government through the Federal Interlocutor for Métis and Non-Status Indians. Indigenous political organizations throughout Canada vary in political standing, viewpoints, and reasons for forming. First Nations, Métis and Inuit negotiate with the Government of Canada through Crown–Indigenous Relations and Northern Affairs Canada in all affairs concerning land, entitlement, and rights. The First Nation groups that operate independently do not belong to these groups.

== Culture ==
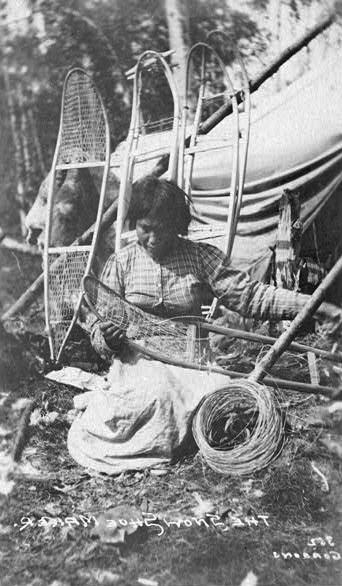
Traditional snowshoe maker, c. 1900

Countless Indigenous words, inventions and games have become an everyday part of Canadian language and use. The canoe, snowshoes, the toboggan, lacrosse, tug of war, maple syrup and tobacco are just a few of the products, inventions and games. Some of the words include the barbecue, caribou, chipmunk, woodchuck, hammock, skunk, and moose.

Many places in Canada, both natural features and human habitations, use Indigenous names. The word Canada itself derives from the St. Lawrence Iroquoian word meaning 'village' or 'settlement'. The province of Saskatchewan derives its name from the Saskatchewan River, which in the Cree language is called Kisiskatchewani Sipi, meaning 'swift-flowing river'. Ottawa, the name of Canada's capital city, comes from the Algonquin language term adawe, meaning 'to trade'.

Modern youth groups, such as Scouts Canada and the Girl Guides of Canada, include programs based largely on Indigenous lore, arts and crafts, character building and outdoor camp craft and living.

Indigenous cultural areas depend upon their ancestors' primary lifeway, or occupation, at the time of European contact. These culture areas correspond closely with physical and ecological regions of Canada. The Indigenous peoples of the Pacific Northwest Coast were centred around ocean and river fishing; in the interior of British Columbia, hunter-gatherer and river fishing. In both of these areas, the salmon was of chief importance. For the people of the plains, bison hunting was the primary activity. In the subarctic forest, other species such as the moose were more important. For peoples near the Great Lakes and St. Lawrence River, shifting agriculture was practised, including the raising of maize, beans, and squash. While for Inuit, hunting was the primary source of food with seals the primary component of their diet. The caribou, fish, other marine mammals and to a lesser extent plants, berries and seaweed are part of the Inuit diet. One of the most noticeable symbols of Inuit culture, the inuksuk is the emblem of the Vancouver 2010 Winter Olympics. Inuksuit are rock sculptures made by stacking stones; in the shape of a human figure, they are called inunnguaq.

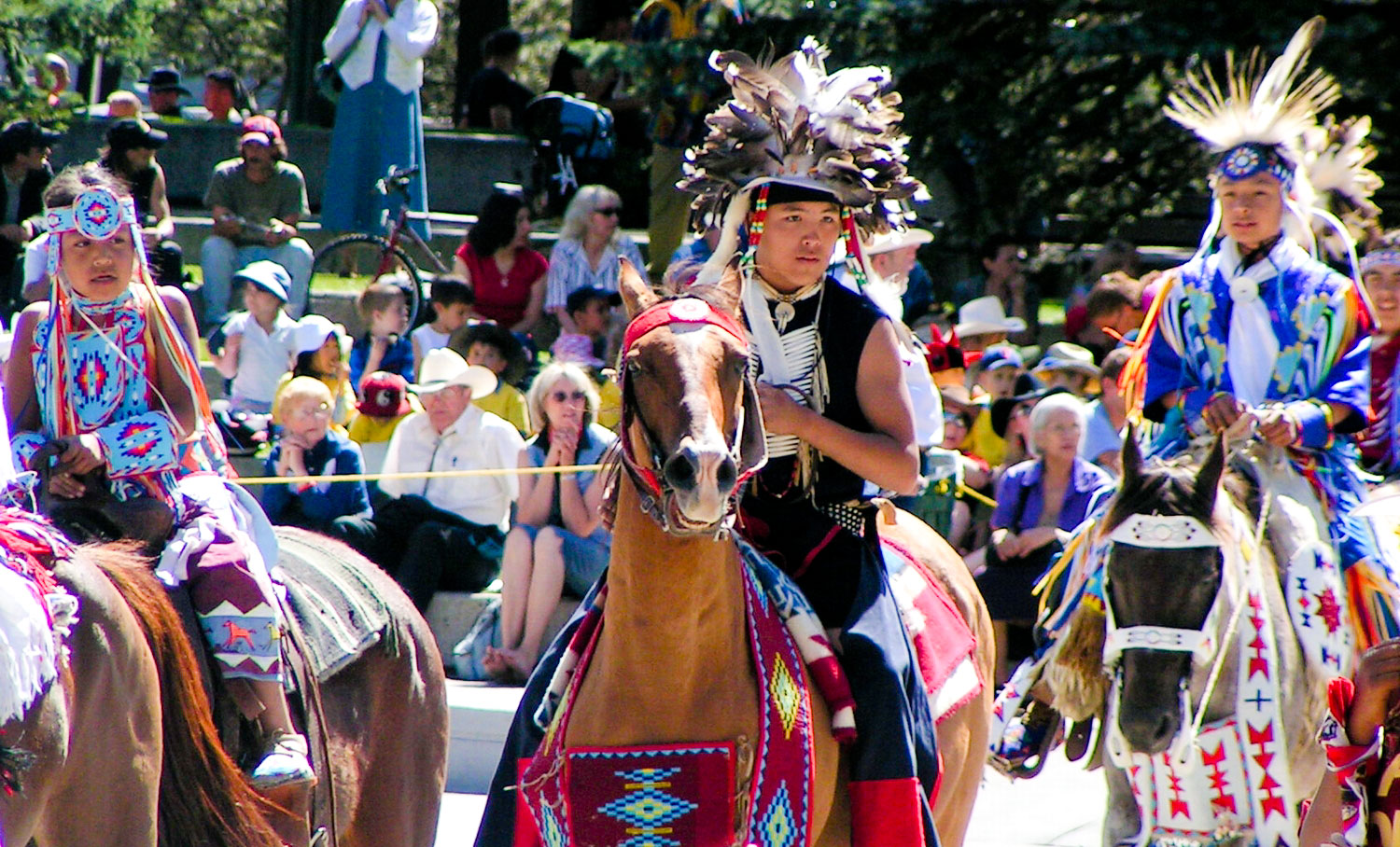
Tsuu T'ina children at a parade

Indian reserves, established in Canadian law by treaties such as Treaty 7, are lands of First Nations recognized by non-Indigenous governments. Some reserves are within cities, such as the Opawikoscikan Reserve in Prince Albert, Saskatchewan, Wendake in Quebec City or Enoch Cree Nation 135 in the Edmonton Metropolitan Region. There are more reserves in Canada than there are First Nations, which were ceded multiple reserves by treaty. Indigenous people currently work in a variety of occupations and may live outside their ancestral homes. The traditional cultures of their ancestors, shaped by nature, still exert a strong influence on them, from spirituality to political attitudes. National Indigenous Peoples Day is a day of recognition of the cultures and contributions of the First Nations, Inuit and Métis peoples of Canada. The day was first celebrated in 1996, after it was proclaimed that year, by then Governor General of Canada, Roméo LeBlanc, to be celebrated on June 21 annually. Most provincial jurisdictions do not recognize it as a statutory holiday.

=== Languages ===
There are thirteen Indigenous language groups, eleven oral and two sign, in Canada, made up of more than sixty-five distinct dialects. Of these, only Cree, Inuktitut, and Ojibwe have a large enough population of fluent speakers to be considered viable to survive in the long term. Two of Canada's territories give official status to native languages. In Nunavut, Inuktut, also known as the Inuit language, (Inuktitut and Inuinnaqtun) are official languages alongside the national languages of English and French.

In the Northwest Territories, the Official Languages Act declares that there are 11 different languages: Chipewyan, Cree, English, French, Gwichʼin, Inuinnaqtun, Inuktitut, Inuvialuktun, North Slavey, South Slavey, and Tłįchǫ. Besides English and French, these languages are not vehicular in government; official status entitles citizens to receive services in them on request and to deal with the government in them.

Indigenous language	No. of speakers	Mother tongue	Home language
Cree	99,950	78,855	47,190
Inuktitut	35,690	32,010	25,290
Ojibway	32,460	24,190	11,115
Montagnais-Naskapi (Innu)	11,815	10,970	9,720
Dene	11,130	9,750	7,490
Oji-Cree (Anihshininiimowin)	12,605	11,690	8,480
Mi'kmaq	8,750	7,365	3,985
Siouan languages (Dakota/Sioux)	6,495	5,585	3,780
Atikamekw	5,645	5,245	4,745
Blackfoot	4,915	3,085	1,575
For a complete list see: Spoken languages of Canada

Source': Statistics Canada, 2006 Census Profile of Federal Electoral Districts (2003 Representation Order): Language, Mobility and Migration and Immigration and Citizenship Ottawa, 2007, pp. 2, 6, 10.

=== Visual art ===
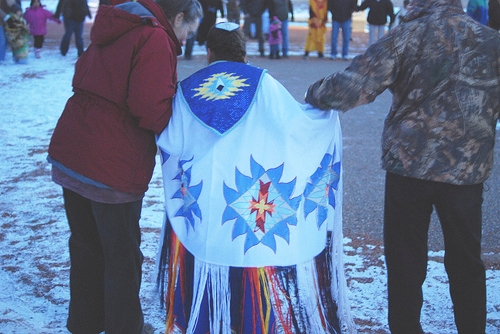
A young Métis girl wearing a traditional shawl

Indigenous peoples were producing art for thousands of years before the arrival of European settler colonists and the eventual establishment of Canada as a nation state. Like the peoples who produced them, Indigenous art traditions spanned territories across North America. Indigenous art traditions are organized by art historians according to cultural, linguistic or regional groups: Northwest Coast, Plateau, Plains, Eastern Woodlands, Subarctic, and Arctic.

Art traditions vary enormously amongst and within these diverse groups. Indigenous art with a focus on portability and the body is distinguished from European traditions and its focus on architecture. Indigenous visual art may be used in conjunction with other arts. Among Inuit the masks and rattles of the angakkuq (shaman) are used ceremoniously in dance, storytelling and music. Artworks preserved in museum collections date from the period after European contact and show evidence of the creative adoption and adaptation of European trade goods such as metal and glass beads. The distinct Métis cultures that have arisen from inter-cultural relationships with Europeans contribute culturally hybrid art forms. During the 19th and the first half of the 20th century the Canadian government pursued an active policy of forced and cultural assimilation toward Indigenous peoples. The Indian Act banned manifestations of the Sun Dance, the Potlatch, and works of art depicting them.

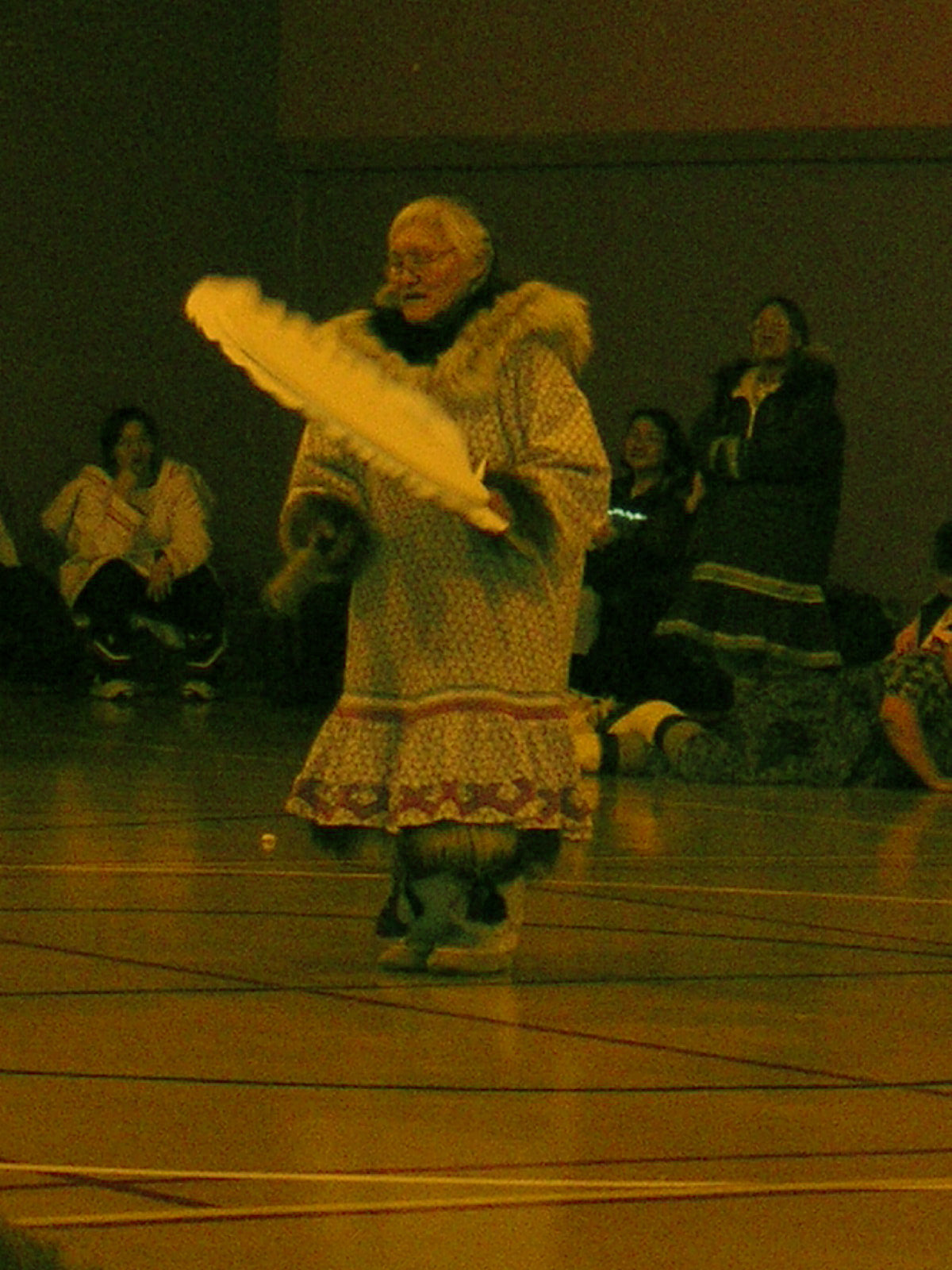
Dancer at Drum Dance Festival, Gjoa Haven, Nunavut

It was not until the 1950s and 1960s that Indigenous artists such as Mungo Martin, Bill Reid and Norval Morrisseau began to publicly renew and re-invent Indigenous art traditions. Currently, there are Indigenous artists practising in all media in Canada and two Indigenous artists, Edward Poitras and Rebecca Belmore, have represented Canada at the Venice Biennale in 1995 and 2005 respectively.

=== Music ===
Indigenous peoples in Canada encompass diverse ethnic groups with their individual musical traditions. Music is usually social (public) or ceremonial (private). Public, social music may be dance music accompanied by rattles and drums. Private, ceremonial music includes vocal songs with accompaniment on percussion, used to mark occasions like Midewivin ceremonies and Sun Dances.

Traditionally, Indigenous peoples used the materials at hand to make their instruments for centuries before Europeans immigrated to Canada. First Nations people made gourds and animal horns into rattles, which were elaborately carved and brightly painted. In woodland areas, they made horns of birch bark and drumsticks of carved antlers and wood. Traditional percussion instruments such as drums were generally made of carved wood and animal hides. These musical instruments provide the background for songs, and songs the background for dances. Traditional First Nations people consider song and dance to be sacred. For years after Europeans came to Canada, First Nations people were forbidden to practice their ceremonies.

== Demography ==
Percent reporting indigenous identity by census division as of the 2021 census.

There are three (First Nations, Inuit and Métis) distinctive groups of Indigenous peoples that are recognized in the Canadian Constitution Act, 1982, sections 25 and 35. Under the Employment Equity Act, Indigenous people are a designated group along with women, visible minorities, and persons with disabilities; as such, they are neither a visible minority under the Act or in the view of Statistics Canada.

The 2021 Census data reveals that there are over 1.8 million Indigenous people in Canada, comprising 5.0% of the overall population and a slight increase from 4.9% in 2016.

The growth of the Indigenous population has slowed compared to previous years. The population grew by 18.9% between 2011 to 2016, while the growth from 2016 to 2021 was only 9.4%. For the first time, the Census recorded more than 1 million First Nations people living in Canada. The Indigenous population continues to grow at a faster rate than the non-Indigenous population but at a reduced speed. The Indigenous population is projected to reach between 2.5 million and 3.2 million in the next 20 years.

The First Nations population overall increased by 9.7% from 2016 to 2021. However, Status First Nations saw a slower growth of 4.1%, compared to those without Registered Indian status, which grew by 27.2%. The Métis population rose by 6.3%, and the Inuit population grew by 8.5%. More than half of First Nations people (55. 5%) lived in Western Canada as of 2021. Ontario had the highest number of First Nations people, with 251,030 (about 23.9%) of the total First Nations population. Approximately 11.1% of First Nations people lived in Quebec, with 7.6% in Atlantic Canada and 1.9% in the territories.

The 2021 Census showed nearly three in four Canadians lived in urban areas, with 801,045 Indigenous people living in large urban centers. This is an increase of 12.5% from 2016, signifying that Indigenous people were more likely to reside in these areas compared to before.

Moreover, the Indigenous population is generally younger than the non-Indigenous population. In 2021, the average age of Indigenous people was 33.6 years, compared to 41.8 years for non-Indigenous people. The Inuit population was the youngest, averaging 28.9 years, followed by First Nations at 32.5 years and Métis at 35.9 years. In total, there were 459,215 Indigenous children aged 14 years and younger, making up 25.4% of the Indigenous population, while only 16.0% of the non-Indigenous population fell into this age category.

In the 20th century, the Indigenous population of Canada increased tenfold. Between 1900 and 1950 the population grew by 29%. After the 1960s the infant mortality level on reserves dropped dramatically. Since the 1980s, the number of First Nations babies more than doubled and in 2009 almost half of the First Nations population was under the age of 25.

Indigenous people assert that their sovereign rights are valid, pointing to the Royal Proclamation of 1763, which is mentioned in the Canadian Constitution Act, 1982, Section 25, the British North America Acts and the 1969 Vienna Convention on the Law of Treaties (to which Canada is a signatory) in support of this claim.

=== Religion ===
Indigenous Canadian demography by religion
Religious group	2021 (Note: Religious breakdown proportions based on "Indigenous" ethnic or cultural origin response on the 2021 census.)		2001 (Note: Religious breakdown proportions based on "Indigenous" ethnic or cultural origin response on the 2001 census.)	
Religious group	Pop.	%	Pop.	%
Christianity	950,080	46.14%	738,890	73.82%
Islam	2,245	0.11%	635	0.06%
Irreligion	983,070	47.74%	232,215	23.2%
Judaism	1,620	0.08%	620	0.06%
Buddhism	2,405	0.12%	1,215	0.12%
Hinduism	240	0.01%	185	0.02%
Indigenous spirituality	91,495	4.44%	1,145	0.11%
Sikhism	135	0.01%	115	0.01%
Other	27,995	1.36%	29,170	2.91%
Total Indigenous Canadian population	2,059,285	100%	1,000,890	100%

Indigenous Canadian demography by Christian sects
Religious group	2021		2001	
Religious group	Pop.	%	Pop.	%
Catholic	582,500	61.31%	424,100	57.65%
Orthodox	2,015	0.11%	885	0.12%
Protestant	250,260	26.34%	277,630	37.74%
Other Christian	115,305	12.14%	33,015	4.49%
Total Indigenous Canadian christian population	950,080	100%	735,630	100%

=== Geographical distribution ===
Ethnographers commonly classify Indigenous peoples of the Americas in the United States and Canada into ten geographical regions, cultural areas, with shared cultural traits. The Canadian regions are:

- Arctic cultural area (Eskaleut languages)
- Subarctic culture area (Na-Dene languages and Algic languages)
- Eastern Woodlands (Northeast) cultural area (Algic languages and Iroquoian languages)
- Plains cultural area (Siouan–Catawban languages)
- Northwest Plateau cultural area (Interior Salish languages)
- Northwest Coast cultural area (Penutian languages, Tsimshianic languages and Wakashan languages)

==== Urban population ====
Across Canada, 56% of Indigenous peoples live in urban areas. The urban Indigenous population is the fastest-growing population segment in Canada.

Urban Indigenous Population (2001−2021)
Metro area	Province	2021		2011		2001	
Metro area	Province	Pop.	%	Pop.	%	Pop.	%
Winnipeg	Manitoba	102,075	12.45%	78,415	10.97%	55,755	8.43%
Edmonton	Alberta	87,600	6.27%	61,770	5.42%	40,930	4.42%
Vancouver	British Columbia	63,340	2.43%	52,375	2.3%	36,860	1.87%
Calgary	Alberta	48,625	3.32%	33,375	2.78%	21,915	2.32%
Ottawa-Gatineau	Ontario-Quebec	46,540	3.18%	30,570	2.51%	13,485	1.28%
Montreal	Quebec	46,085	1.1%	26,285	0.7%	11,085	0.33%
Toronto	Ontario	44,635	0.73%	36,990	0.67%	20,300	0.44%
Saskatoon	Saskatchewan	34,890	11.2%	23,890	9.32%	20,275	9.11%
Regina	Saskatchewan	24,520	10.01%	19,785	9.55%	15,685	8.25%
Victoria	British Columbia	19,455	5.01%	14,200	4.22%	8,695	2.83%
Greater Sudbury	Ontario	19,005	11.34%	13,410	8.47%	7,385	4.8%
Halifax	Nova Scotia	18,850	4.09%	9,655	2.51%	3,525	0.99%
Prince Albert	Saskatchewan	18,135	41.86%	15,780	38.53%	11,640	29.18%
Thunder Bay	Ontario	16,935	14%	11,675	9.8%	8,200	6.81%
Hamilton	Ontario	15,420	1.99%	11,980	1.69%	7,270	1.11%
Quebec	Quebec	14,725	1.8%	6,450	0.86%	4,130	0.61%
London	Ontario	13,675	2.55%	8,475	1.81%	5,640	1.32%
Kelowna	British Columbia	13,420	6.14%	8,255	4.68%	3,950	2.71%
Prince George	British Columbia	13,100	14.9%	9,930	11.98%	7,980	9.43%
St. Catharines - Niagara	Ontario	13,080	3.07%	8,850	2.3%	4,970	1.34%
Kamloops	British Columbia	12,255	11.09%	8,265	8.56%	5,470	6.36%
Abbotsford-Mission	British Columbia	10,525	5.48%	6,970	4.18%	4,215	2.91%
Chilliwack	British Columbia	10,515	9.43%	8,340	9.24%	4,015	5.81%
Oshawa	Ontario	10,045	2.44%	6,095	1.73%	3,020	1.03%

=== Peoples ===
Canada census 2021.

- The abbreviation "n.o.s." means "not otherwise specified." This category includes responses indicating North American Indigenous origins, not otherwise specified (e.g., "Aboriginal," "Indigenous").
- The abbreviation "n.i.e." means "not included elsewhere." This category includes specific Anishinaabe origins, not included elsewhere (e.g., "Mississauga," "Nipissing").

Single and multiple Indigenous ancestry responses (4A)4	Language group	Indigenous ancestry responses		Province/territory
Single and multiple Indigenous ancestry responses (4A)4	Language group	Total (Single or multiple)	Single only	Province/territory
Total North American Indigenous origins		2,204,475	2,082,515	
North American Indigenous n.o.s.		194,840	193,105	
First Nations (North American Indian) origins		1,426,950	1,307,280	
First Nations (North American Indian) n.o.s.		632,340	613,125	
Abenaki	Algonquian - Eastern Algonquian	18,420	16,310	Quebec 89%
Anishinaabe origins	Algonquian - Ojibwe-Potawatomi	189,710	152,640	Ontario 46.8%, Manitoba 19.7%, Quebec 17.4%
Apache	Athabaskan - Southern Athabascan	1,265	995	
Atikamekw	Algonquian - Cree-Montagnais-Naskapi	8,400	7,630	Quebec 98.4%
Blackfoot origins	Algonquian - Siksika	23,200	18,540	Alberta 65.6%, Ontario 15.5%
Cherokee	Iroquoian - Cherokee	10,825	9,120	
Cheyenne	Algonquian - Cheyenne	565	360	
Choctaw	Muskogean	685	485	
Cree origins	Algonquian - Cree-Montagnais-Naskapi	250,330	198,655	Alberta 28%, Saskatchewan 24.4%, Manitoba 17.3%
Delaware (Lenape)	Algonquian - Eastern Algonquian	1,180	810	Ontario 84.3%
Dene origins	Athabaskan - Northern Athabaskan languages	47,565	33,960	British Columbia 29.2%, Northwest Territories 20.4%, Saskatchewan 18.5%, Alberta 17.9%
Gitxsan	Tsimshianic	5,075	3,515	British Columbia 95.2%
Haida	Haida	4,725	3,680	British Columbia 86.1%
Haisla	Wakashan - Northern	1,495	890	British Columbia 90.6%
Heiltsuk	Wakashan - Northern	1,620	1,065	British Columbia 97.8%
Huron (Wendat)	Iroquoian - Northern	15,915	12,460	Quebec 80.1%
Innu origins	Algonquian - Cree-Montagnais-Naskapi	28,960	25,155	Quebec 84.8%
Iroquoian (Haudenosaunee) origins	Iroquoian - Northern	55,200	45,495	Ontario 53.5%, Quebec 28.3%
Ktunaxa (Kutenai)	Kutenai	810	565	British Columbia 82.1%
Kwakwaka'wakw origins	Wakashan - Northern	2,720	1,930	British Columbia 88.8%
Maliseet	Algonquian - Eastern Algonquian	7,220	6,180	Quebec 42.5%, New Brunswick 41.3%
Mi'kmaq origins	Algonquian - Eastern Algonquian	122,350	111,890	Newfoundland and Labrador 21.3%, Ontario 18.8%, Nova Scotia 18.1%, Quebec 16.6%
Navajo	Athabaskan - Southern Athabascan	755	440	
Nisga'a	Tsimshianic	5,000	3,360	British Columbia 95.6%
Nuu-chah-nulth origins	Wakashan - Southern	2,900	2,225	British Columbia 93.8%
Nuxalk	Salishan - Nuxalk	1,055	615	British Columbia 98.6%
Passamaquoddy	Algonquian - Eastern Algonquian	560	435	New Brunswick 66.1%
Salish origins	Salishan	25,685	20,260	British Columbia 87.0%
Salish n.o.	Salishan	2,225	1,510	
Coast Salish origins	Coast Salish	13,040	10,290	
Interior Salish origins	Interior Salish	11,310	8,465	
Siouan origins	Siouan	16,570	8,820	Saskatchewan 31.9%, Manitoba 25.4%, Alberta 21.8%
Tsimshian	Tsimshianic	4,945	3,110	British Columbia 94.2%
Wuikinuxv	Wakashan - Northern	195	70	British Columbia 86.7%
First Nations (North American Indian) origins n.i.e.35		3,605	2,480	
Inuit origins		82,010	73,995	Nunavut 37.6%, Quebec 22.0%, Newfoundland and Labrador 12.5%
Métis		560,335	508,135	
Non-Indigenous origins		35,343,280	1,155,115	

== See also ==
- Aboriginal land title in Canada
- Index of articles related to Indigenous Canadians
- Indigenous education in Canada
- Indigenous peoples in Northern Canada
- Settler colonialism in Canada
