= Blood Lines (film) =

2025 Canadian drama film

- Theatrical release poster
- Directed by: Gail Maurice
- Written by: Gail Maurice
- Produced by: Gail Maurice; Paula Devonshire; Jamie Manning
- Starring: Dana Solomon; Gail Maurice; Derica Lafrance
- Cinematography: Steve Cosens
- Edited by: Maureen Grant; Harrison Perez
- Music by: Justin Delorme
- Production companies: Assini Productions; Devonshire Productions; Night Market
- Distributed by: Elevation Pictures
- Release date: September 8, 2025 (AIFF)
- Running time: 89 minutes
- Country: Canada
- Languages: English; Michif

Blood Lines is a 2025 Canadian romantic drama film, directed by Gail Maurice. The film stars Dana Solomon as Beatrice, a Métis storyteller and store clerk whose life is upended when she is encouraged to reconcile with her estranged mother Leonore (Maurice) after many years of no contact, at the same time as being drawn into a romance with Chani (Derica Lafrance), a woman who arrives in their community looking for her biological family, leading to a shocking discovery.

The cast also includes Mélanie Bray, Bertha Durocher, Maggie Maurice, Mary Burnouf, Tamara Podemski, David Webster, Michaela Washburn and Ryan G. Hinds. The film includes dialogue in both Michif and English.

The film premiered in the Centrepiece program at the 2025 Toronto International Film Festival, and went into commercial release in June 2026.

== Production ==
Maurice first sought to make the film about 20 years before it finally entered production, but faced problems attracting funding because of the film's LGBTQ content. Her initial plan was to play Beatrice herself, although she ultimately played Leonore because the production delays meant that she could no longer play a young woman.

She described the film as having been inspired by her own fear that she might inadvertently start sleeping with or dating an unknown relative during her youth bar-hopping years.

== Critical response ==
Barry Hertz of The Globe and Mail wrote that "It is no small victory to showcase the Michif dialect on the screen – and whoever cast the Granny Gang deserves a bonus – but for what is ultimately a romance, there isn’t nearly enough heart. Even by the time the movie reaches its big, eyebrow-raising curve, passions have been running too low for anyone to put up much of a fuss. At times, water feels thicker than Blood Lines."

For Exclaim!, Alisha Mughal wrote that "The film succeeds as a comedy about the beauty of community, but fails to satisfyingly accommodate its proportions to the heavy-hearted drama of the second half of the story. While exploring how crucial community is to survival, Blood Lines also tells a beautiful story of intergenerational pain and familial loss — the difficulty in choosing to heal and choosing family. Maurice carries the story with emotional awareness, but with a technical skill that falters, leaving us ultimately with a film that's not fully realized and only halfway towards completion."

Lauren Weiner of That Shelf opined that "Blood Lines has truly good bones — and some truly good intentions — but too much gristle. It is determined to tackle incredibly pertinent issues like discrimination against indigenous families, cultural estrangement, and even the complexities of romantic love. Yet the plot only briefly touches on these points, leaving audiences with a real sense of missed opportunity. While this second feature feels like a misstep for Maurice overall, there is serious storytelling potential here that could be resolved with a stronger script. More Métis voices in cinema can only be a positive step in the right direction."
