= Anglo-Métis =

19th century community of the Métis people of Canada

Countryborn

Total population
- Today part of the Métis people (Canada). (Anglo-Metis were a pre-20th century ethnic group)

Regions with significant populations
- Canada

Languages
- Bungee, English, Scottish Gaelic (Gaelic), Cree, Saulteaux, Assiniboine, Hand Talk

Religion
- Predominantly Anglican, Presbyterian, Indigenous Spiritualities & Syncretic Beliefs, Some Minority Roman Catholic

Related ethnic groups
- Cree, Ojibwa, Orcadians, Scottish Canadians, English Canadians, other Métis

A 19th century community of the Métis people of Canada, the Anglo-Métis, more commonly known as Countryborn, were children of fur traders; they typically had Scots (Orcadian, Mainland Scotland), or English fathers and Indigenous mothers, often Cree, Anishinaabekwe (notably often Saulteaux), Nakoda, amongst others. They were also known as "English halfbreeds." Some Anglo-Metis still identify by this name. Their first languages were generally those of their mothers—such as Cree, Saulteaux, and Assiniboine—and English. Some of their fathers spoke Gaelic or Scots, leading to the development of the creole language known as "Bungee". Some scholars have started spelling Métis as "Metis" to acknowledge the presence and contributions of the Anglo-Métis and the complex history of the Métis people overall.

== History ==
The Anglo-Métis, like their francophone cousins, lived in the Prairies and the area adjacent to the Red River Colony but also in fur trading and military settlements in Ontario along the Great Lakes and James Bay. There also some records of Anglo-Métis families descending from relationships between British soldiers and Indigenous women of various tribes. They then tended to identify more with the politically and economically dominant British culture of Canada. If they were descended from Scottish fur traders and Indigenous women, they were often baptized as part of the Presbyterian church if their fathers chose to acknowledge their existence. Case studies have been done on the birth and baptism registers at the St. Gabriel Street Presbyterian Church in Montreal because it provides a good example of how Métis children adjusted to staying temporarily or living in an urban environment that was considerably foreign compared to the remote, rural fur trading settlements or Indigenous camps in which they were born. Thus, most Anglo-Métis were the result of relationships, officially recognized by the Church or not, between English and Scottish fur traders and Indigenous women. The ethnicity of their fathers also determined which of the competing fur trading companies they might end up working for as adults. If they were descended from English fur traders, they generally worked for the Hudson's Bay Company. If they were descended from Scottish fur traders, they generally worked for the North West Company, also known as "Nor'Westers." Additionally, the Anglo-Métis/Countryborn had a more sedentary lifestyle of farming than the francophone Métis community, whose men were generally hunters and trappers. The French-speaking Métis were somewhat more nomadic because they relied upon hunting as a trade and food resource. The Anglo-Métis played a role in both the Red River Rebellion of 1869 and the North-West Rebellion of 1885, as they suffered from similar issues of racial discrimination and land problems as their francophone brethren.

By the 19th century, the English-speaking and French-speaking Métis had become quite similar culturally and were moving closer to each other in opposition to the British-Canadian majority. Their musical traditions, especially in the case of fiddle music, were derived from both British Isles and France, as was the Métis traditional dance referred to as "jigging," or the "Red River Jig." Their complexion ranged from fair skinned, blond hair, and blue eyed to dark skinned, with dark hair and dark eyes. Métis elders say that no distinctions were made between individuals based upon complexion within the community. Family, culture, and strong identification with their Christian faith were the unifying bond them. The two communities' primary differences lay in their languages and Christian religious affiliations those of French descent were generally Roman Catholic, and those of British descent were Protestant. Most Countryborn were Anglican or Presbyterian. They were involved in a mixed economy of subsistence farming and bison hunting throughout most of the 19th century and also found employment with the Hudson's Bay Company and the North West Company.

The Countryborn were often known in the 19th century as "mixed-bloods," "Black Scots," "Native English," or "Half-Breeds" (the last term is now considered pejorative). The French-speaking Metis referred to them simply as les métis anglais or les autres métis. Anglo-Metis gradually came to see themselves as being hardly different from the French-speaking Métis.

Today, the two groups are no longer politically distinct; both are commonly known on the Canadian Prairies simply as Métis.

Prominent Anglo-Métis/Countryborn include James Isbister, Thomas McKay, and John Norquay.

== See also ==
- Michif
- Métis Flag
