= Québexit =

2020 Canadian film

- Directed by: Joshua Demers
- Written by: Joshua Demers; Gail Maurice; Xavier Yuvens
- Produced by: Joshua Demers; Shannon Fewster
- Starring: Gail Maurice; Alison Louder; Xavier Yuvens; Nicole Joy-Fraser
- Cinematography: Elisa Iannacone
- Edited by: Joshua Demers
- Production company: Coconut Effect Productions
- Release date: September 22, 2020 (Cinéfest)
- Running time: 80 minutes
- Country: Canada
- Languages: English; French; Cree

Québexit is a 2020 Canadian political comedy film, directed by Joshua Demers. The film's plot centres on the aftermath of a successful Quebec sovereignty referendum, focusing on conflicts at the new international Quebec-New Brunswick border between the Canadian Armed Forces, the new army of Quebec, and a pair of indigenous women whose ancestral land rights mean that they cannot be stopped from crossing the border at will.

The film's cast includes Gail Maurice, Xavier Yuvens, Alison Louder, Nicole Joy-Fraser, Daniel Gravelle, Alexandre Côté, Mélanie Bray, Voytek Skrzeta, Indy Saluja, Valérie Descheneaux, Andrew White-Martin, Emmanuel Kabongo, Nathalie Nadon, Florian François, Pierre Simpson, Kyle McDonald, Keenan Grom, Samantha Brown and Jennifer Vallance. It features dialogue in English, French and Cree; despite being set on the Quebec-New Brunswick border, the film was shot principally in Pickering, Ontario.

The film premiered at the 2020 Cinéfest Sudbury International Film Festival in September 2020. In December it was screened at the Whistler Film Festival, where Maurice, Yuvens, and Demers won the Borsos Competition award for Best Screenplay in a Canadian Film.
