= Gail Maurice =

Canadian actor and writer

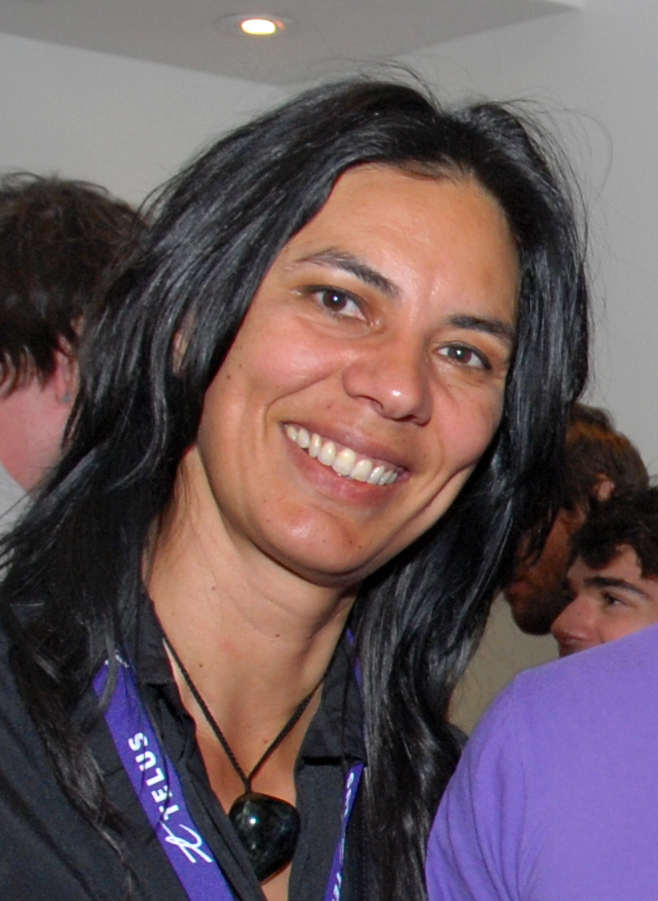
- Gail Maurice at a Canadian Film Centre Filmmakers Reception in 2011
- Occupations: Actor, writer, director

Gail Maurice is a Canadian actor, writer, producer, and director. She is most noted for her performances as the title character in the film Johnny Greyeyes, Dorothy Pine in the television series Cardinal, and Georgina in the television series Trickster.

== Career ==
Maurice is the head of Assini Productions, a film studio whose films have included Smudge (2006), Kihtwam misawac na-wapamitin (2011), Assini (2015), and Rosie (2018).

She was a co-writer and star of Joshua Demers's 2020 film Québexit. At the 2020 Whistler Film Festival, Maurice, Demers, and Xavier Yuvens won the Borsos Competition award for Best Screenplay in a Canadian Film.

At the 9th Canadian Screen Awards in 2021, she received a nomination for Best Supporting Actress in a Drama Program or Series for her performance in Trickster. At the 10th Canadian Screen Awards in 2022, she was nominated for Best Supporting Actress in a Film, for the film Night Raiders.

Rosie, Maurice's debut feature film as a director and an expansion of her 2018 short film of the same name, premiered in the Discovery programme at the 2022 Toronto International Film Festival.

Her second feature film, Blood Lines, premiered at the 2025 Toronto International Film Festival.

== Personal life ==
Maurice is in a relationship with Mélanie Bray, one of the stars of Rosie.

== Filmography ==
=== Film ===
Year	Title	Role	Notes
2000	Johnny Greyeyes	Johnny Greyeyes	
2007	Finn's Girl	Nancy	
2016	Me and My Little Sister		Documentary
2018	Falls Around Her	Inez	
2019	The Incredible 25th Year of Mitzi Bearclaw	Annabelle Bearclaw	
2020	Québexit	Meetos	
2021	Meneath: The Hidden Island of Ethics	Nokomis	Voice; short film
2021	Night Raiders	Ida	
2022	Bones of Crows	Older Taylor Whallach	
2022	Rosie		Director
2024	Aberdeen	Aberdeen	
2025	Nika and Madison	Chief Sampson	
2025	Blood Lines	Leonore	Also director and producer
2026	Ancestral Beasts	Adele Poitras	

=== Television ===
Year	Title	Role	Notes
1996	Giant Mine	Technician	Television film
1997	The Rez	Barbara Fencepost	Episode: "No Reservations: One Hour Finale"
1998	Big Bear	Nowakich	2 episodes
2000	Psi Factor	Kachata	Episode: "GeoCore"
2000	Canada: A People's History	Captive Woman	Episode: "When the World Began"
2000	Twice in a Lifetime	Ruth's Daughter	Episode: "Grandma's Shoes"
2002–2003	Street Time	Skye Nighthawk	6 episodes
2003	Monsters We Met	She Yoh	Episode: "The Eternal Frontier"
2016	Cold	Sara	2 episodes
2017–2020	Cardinal	Dorothy Pine	5 episodes
2019	The Twilight Zone	Rita Colchack	Episode: "A Traveler"
2020	Diggstown	Annabel Draper	Episode: "Cheryl Battiste"
2020	Barkskins	Teyaronhiio'	3 episodes
2020	Trickster	Georgina	5 episodes
2021	Sort Of	ICU Nurse	Episode: "Sort Of Back Again"
2024	Don't Even	Wanda	4 episodes
2026	Law & Order Toronto: Criminal Intent	Charlotte Malboeuf	Episode: "Forget Me Not"
