= Métis French =

Canadian French variety of the Métis people

- Le français métis
- Native to: Saskatchewan, Alberta, Manitoba
- Ethnicity: Métis people
- Native speakers: (undated figure of <100)
- Language family: Indo-European: Italic; Latino-Faliscan; Latinic; Romance; Italo-Western; Western Romance; Gallo-Iberian; Gallo-Romance; Gallo-Rhaetian?; Arpitan–Oïl; Oïl; Francien zone; French; Canadian French; Métis French

Language codes
- ISO 639-3: –
- Glottolog: None

Métis "mixed"
- People: Métis
- Language: Michif; Métis French; Hand Talk
- Country: Michif Piyii

Métis French (French: français métis) is one of the traditional languages of the Métis people along with Michif and Bungi, and is the French-dialect source of Michif.

== Features ==
Métis French is a variety of Canadian French with some added characters such as Ññ, Áá, Óó, and Ææ (from older French spellings) (example, il ñá ócun nævus sur ce garçon English: "there is no birthmark on this boy") and words loaned from indigenous languages such as Ojibwe, Beaver and Cree.

Like Michif, Métis French is spoken in Manitoba and North Dakota and adjacent provinces or states. As a general rule, Métis individuals speak one or the other, rarely both. Métis French and Michif share a common phonology and morphosyntax for the noun phrase but differ as to their sources for the verb phrase which is Ojibwe-Cree based in Michif, French-based in Métis French. Examples of this loaning can be found in words such as cacúare French pronunciation: [qɑˈkwɑʁ], from the Cree word kakwe, meaning "to try/attempt", which maintains its Cree meaning with the additional colloquial use of "to wander" as in il á cacúu là (English: "he wandered there"), which suggests that the subject wandered with little control of his own feet; in the word ttonne French pronunciation: [tʼɔn], meaning "wolf" or "loyal" (in a pack-like sense) when used as an adjective, from the word for "wolf" in Beaver, ch'one; in the word jaganache French pronunciation: [ʒagɑ̃ʃ], meaning "white/non-Métis" person, from the Ojibwe word zhaganash; and in the word minapæ French pronunciation: [mɛ̃nape], from the Cree word for "good person", miyo-nâpêw, though in Métis French it is closer to the word mec' ("guy") and implies that the word refers to someone that the speaker knows personally.

== Phonology ==
=== Consonants ===
| | | Labial | Alveolar | Palatal | Velar | Uvular |
|---|---|---|---|---|---|---|
| Nasal | | m ⟨m⟩ | n ⟨n⟩ | ɲ ⟨ñ⟩ | ŋ ⟨ng⟩ | |
| Stop | voiceless | p ⟨p⟩ | t ⟨t⟩ | | k ⟨c/qu⟩ | q ⟨c⟩ |
| Stop | voiced | b ⟨b⟩ | d ⟨d⟩ | | ɡ ⟨g⟩ | |
| Stop | ejective | pʼ ⟨pp⟩ | tʼ ⟨tt⟩ | | kʼ ⟨cq⟩ | |
| Fricative | voiceless | f ⟨f⟩ | s ⟨s⟩ | ʃ ⟨ch⟩ | | ʁ ⟨r⟩ |
| Fricative | voiced | v ⟨v⟩ | z ⟨s/z⟩ | ʒ ⟨j⟩ | | χ ⟨h⟩ |
| Approximant | voiceless | | | | | |
| Approximant | voiced | | l ⟨l⟩ | j ⟨y⟩ | w ⟨ou⟩ | |

=== Vowels ===
Oral
| | Front | | Central | Back |
| | unrounded | rounded | Central | Back |
|---|---|---|---|---|
| Close | i ⟨i⟩ | y ⟨u⟩ | | u ⟨ú⟩ |
| Close-mid | e ⟨æ⟩ | ø ⟨é⟩ | ə ⟨e⟩ | o ⟨ó⟩ |
| Open-mid | ɛ ⟨ê⟩ | œ ⟨œ⟩ | ə ⟨e⟩ | ɔ ⟨ô/o⟩ |
| Open | | | a ⟨á⟩ | (ɑ) ⟨a⟩ |

Nasal
| | Front | | Back |
|---|---|---|---|
| Mid | | | ɔ̃ ⟨on⟩ |
| Open | ɛ̃ ⟨en⟩ | (œ̃) ⟨un⟩ | ɑ̃ ⟨an⟩ |

== See also ==
- Michif
- Bungi
