= Johnny Greyeyes =

- Directed by: Jorge Manzano
- Written by: Riel Brown; Vince Manitowabi; Jorge Manzano; Gail Maurice
- Produced by: Timothy Hill; Jorge Manzano
- Starring: Gail Maurice; Columpa Bobb; Jonathan Fisher
- Cinematography: Marcos Arriaga
- Edited by: Jacqueline Carmody
- Music by: Reynaldo Valverde
- Production companies: Nepantla Films; Ravenhead Productions
- Distributed by: Wolfe Video
- Release date: January 21, 2000 (Sundance)
- Running time: 75 minutes
- Country: Canada
- Language: English

Johnny Greyeyes is a 2000 Canadian drama film, directed by Jorge Manzano. The film was originally planned as a documentary about Indigenous women in prison, but was rewritten as a scripted drama based on the personal testimonies of women who had been interviewed.

The film stars Gail Maurice as Johnny Greyeyes, a First Nations woman who falls in love with another woman (Columpa Bobb) in prison. Its cast also includes Georgina Lightning, Jonathan Fisher, Gloria May Eshkibok, Tamara Podemski and Shirley Cheechoo.

The film premiered at the 2000 Sundance Film Festival. It was subsequently screened at the 2000 Inside Out Film and Video Festival, where it won the award for Best Canadian Film.
