= Joshua Demers =

Joshua Demers is a Canadian film director and screenwriter. He is most noted for his debut feature film Québexit, for which he, Gail Maurice and Xavier Yuvens won the Borsos Competition award for Best Screenplay in a Canadian Film at the 2020 Whistler Film Festival.

He was born in Cold Lake, Alberta, to a francophone father and an anglophone mother. He has been a production manager with Insight Productions.

He directed the short films Lead Us Not Into Temptation (2008), The Architect (2009), Norma Jeane and the Tropic of Cancer (2012) and Emily (2014), and the web series Kristal Clear. In 2022, he was producer of the web series Lady Ada's Secret Society.
