= Monsters We Met =

- Genre: Docudrama; Nature documentary
- Narrated by: Ian Holm; William Hootkins (US)
- Country of origin: United Kingdom
- No. of series: 1
- No. of episodes: 3

Production
- Running time: 45–50 minutes 89 minutes (US Version)
- Production company: BBC Natural History Unit

Original release
- Network: BBC Four; Animal Planet
- Release: 8 April – 22 April 2003

Monsters We Met is a nature docudrama produced by the BBC that later aired as a special on Animal Planet in 2004 (under the title, Land of Lost Monsters). The show used computer-generated imagery (CGI) to recreate the life of the giant animals that lived during the Last Ice Age and explains how early humans encountered them. It also features humans as the main reason for the extinction of all great animals.

== Episodes ==
=== Episode 1: The Eternal Frontier (North America, 11,000 BC) ===
Original air date: 8 April 2003

The episode starts by showing mammoths living during the Ice Age. It also shows how early indigenous Americans became apex predators and started hunting them. Early Americans also had to compete with other predators like the short-faced bear and the saber-toothed cat, who posed a threat to them by depleting their food supply and making them starve to death. The episode concludes by stating that there were no extinctions in North America between the Ice Age and the European colonization of the Americas.

==== Cast ====
- Gail Maurice as She Yoh
- Lorne Cardinal as Sea Tan
- Sheldon Yamkovy as Heck Ah
- Glen Gould as Tah Caw

=== Episode 2: The Burning (Australia, 65,000 BC) ===
Original air date: 15 April 2003

It starts by showing how early Aboriginal Australians migrated to Australia. They also encountered the herbivorous marsupial, Diprotodon; the giant bird, Genyornis; and the ferocious monitor lizard, Megalania. The reptiles kill two humans and they plan on burning the fields to kill the giant lizard. The episode then ends with how the burning of the forests changed the landscape of Australia.

==== Cast ====
- Stanley Mirindo as Japangardi
- David Ngoombujarra as Jupurrurla

=== Episode 3: The End of Eden (New Zealand, 1280 AD) ===
Original air date: 22 April 2003

It starts with the Māori populating New Zealand during the Middle Ages. They encounter the giant moa and start to see that it was harmless. They then discover Haast's eagle, which hunts moas and starts to target them. They then start to steal the moa's giant eggs and go after the adults for food. The program then goes into human evolution and goes over how humans have led to the extinctions of the megafauna and how they are still affecting modern animals. The UK version ends on the Moai of Easter Island, noting that humans are "capable of such heroic and triumphant achievements" and yet also capable "of inflicting such horror on the natural world." The U.S. version ends with a scene of space and starts to ask the question about the environmental impact of humanity stating "that if we can't live with these monsters, are we monsters ourselves?".

==== Cast ====
- Toa Waaka as Kupe
- Teo Ao Tahara-Reese as Kupe's wife

== Reception ==
The New York Times's Virginia Heffernan praised the show, writing, "The show's supreme naturalism adds polemical heft to its visual hypothesis, (they caught all this stuff on camera, didn't they?), making its account of prehistory seem like much more than a hypothesis. Land of the Lost Monsters looks like reportage; that's what makes it exciting." The author Michael Klossner wrote, "Land of Lost Monsters benefits from excellent animation of the extinct animals and intelligent reenactments".
