= Bungi dialect =

Moribund English dialect of Manitoba, Canada

Bungi
- Bungee, Bungie, Bungay, Bangay, the Red River Dialect
- Pronunciation: /ˈbʌn.ɡi/
- Native to: Canada
- Region: Red River Colony and Assiniboia, present-day Manitoba
- Native speakers: (<200 cited 1993) potentially extinct
- Language family: Indo-European: Germanic; West Germanic; North Sea Germanic; Anglo-Frisian; Anglic; English; Scottish English; Bungi

Language codes
- ISO 639-3: –
- Glottolog: bung1271
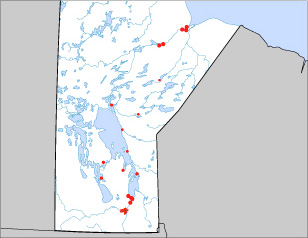
- Geographical distribution of Bungee

- Bungee is classified as Critically Endangered by the UNESCO Atlas of the World's Languages in Danger.

Bungi /ˈbʌn.ɡi/ (also called Bungee, Bungie, Bungay, Bangay, or the Red River Dialect) is a dialect of English with substratal influence from Scottish English, the Orcadian dialect of Scots, Norn, Scottish Gaelic, French, Cree, and Western Ojibwe. It was spoken by the Scottish Red River Métis in present-day Manitoba, Canada, and formerly in areas of Ontario and Minnesota, United States.

Bungi has been categorized as a post-creole, with the distinctive features of the language gradually abandoned by successive generations of speakers in favour of standard Canadian English. In 1870, about 5,000 Métis were native speakers of Bungi, but by the late 1980s, only a handful of elderly speakers were known. Today, Bungi has very few if any speakers and is potentially extinct.

Bungi was spoken in the Lower Red River Colony in the area from The Forks (where the Red River and Assiniboine River meet in what is now downtown Winnipeg) to the mouth of the Red River at Lake Winnipeg. This is the area where the English/Scottish retired Hudson's Bay Company servants generally settled.

== Name of communication system ==
=== Spelling ===
Over the years, Bungi has been spelled many different ways by many different people, and was often referred to simply as the Red River Dialect. Expanded scholarship has preferred "Bungi" as the preferred spelling over "Bungee" and other spellings.

=== Dialect ===
The name derives from either Ojibwe: bangii, or Cree: pahkī, both words meaning a little bit. In these colloquial uses the term may have mildly pejorative connotations, even when used by speakers to describe themselves. Bungi is unusual as a dialect in that for the Scottish immigrants and the First Nations who developed the dialect, English was often a second language.

=== Language ===
Others, such as Brian Orvis, a Bungi-speaker from Selkirk, Manitoba, argued that Bungi is a language unto its own. He asserted that Bungee-speakers do not like to be recorded speaking the language because the First Nations values are that one should not call attention to oneself. It is because of this, he argues, that it is difficult to document Bungi, and the speakers will often deny knowledge of the language.

== Name of a people ==
In addition to the being the name of a dialect, the word Bungi might have referred to a specific group of Métis of Scottish ancestry. The earliest records report that the name "Bungee" was used by the British, and especially Hudson's Bay Company employees to refer to the Saulteaux. Sometime around the turn of the 20th century, the word Bungi began to be used to refer to people of Scottish and First Nations ancestry.

== Description ==
The most notable particularity of Bungi is its phonology (sound system and pronunciation). Voice quality differences are also apparent. The lexicon is mostly English with borrowings from Gaelic, Cree, Ojibwa, and other languages.

Several researchers have studied Bungi. Margaret Stobie studied Bungi and visited several communities where Bungi was spoken. In her 1971 article, The Dialect Called Bungi, Stobie reported that Bungi was the English dialect spoken by the descendants of Gaelic-speaking Highlanders. Blain conducted one of the most thorough academic studies of Bungi in her thesis and other publications, The Bungee Dialect of the Red River Settlement (1989). Blain's research found extremely negative attitudes to Bungi among the population which had spoken it in previous generations, a factor which likely contributed to its near extinction by the time of her research. The study records the dialect in its final phase, when considerable levelling towards standard Canadian English was present.

Bungi was spoken with a distinctive rhythm with a Gaelic fall, including the way that syllables are stressed, repetition of both nouns and pronouns in a sentence (e.g. "My brother is coming, him."), changes in the pronunciation of phonemes (e.g. the phonemic distinction between [s] and [š] in not present in Western Cree dialects, and were reversed in Bungi from the standard English), etc. The third-person pronouns in Cree do not distinguish between masculine and feminine, which resulted in the interchangeable use of he and she in Bungi without regard for gender (e.g. "My wife he is going to the store."). Bungee borrowed words and structures from the parent languages (e.g. the standard Bungee greeting of "I'm well, you but?" came directly from Cree). Bungi speakers also reported that Bungi uses Cree vowels and Scots consonants. It often uses Cree syntax.

== Social context and extinction of Bungi as a spoken dialect ==
Prior to 1938, people were already expressing concerns about the potential loss of Bungi. In letters to the Winnipeg Evening Tribune, Mr. J. J. Moncrief, writing under the pen name "Old Timer," and Osborne Scott expressed their concerns about the survival of the Red River dialect. Others wrote in letters to the editor of the same newspaper in 1938 that Bungi would be gone in a generation.

In her thesis, The Bungee Dialect of the Red River Settlement (1989), Blain discusses the ways in which Bungi-speaking families were excluded (whether this was intentional discrimination by the community or because of reluctance on the part of the family is not known), including not having their family history included in local history books, being assigned to wash an enormous amount of dishes away from the festivities at events, people trying to hide their Indigenous ancestry, shame about how they sound when they spoke Bungi, etc. Blain also notes that Bungi was in a constant state of change that was evolving towards the local standard English.

Swan also reports the prejudice towards Bungi speakers in her thesis, Ethnicity and the Canadianization of Red River Politics (1991). She suggests that Anglo-Métis Manitoba Premier John Norquay, who was born near St. Andrews in what was the Red River Colony and would have spoken Bungi, had dropped his accent by the time that he had entered politics.

The social prejudice towards Bungi speakers and the very sensitive linguistic environment ultimately led to the extinction of this dialect.

== Scholarship ==
The main linguistic documentation of this dialect were conducted by Eleanor M. Blain (1987, 1989), Francis "Frank" J. Walters (1969–1970,), Margaret Stobie (1967–68, 1970, 1971) and Elaine Gold (2007, 2009). Osborne Scott also contributed to the understanding of Bungi (1937, 1951).

== Examples of Bungi ==
=== Example from J. J. Moncrieef article ===
In an article titled Red River Dialect published in 1936 under the pseudonym Old Timer (a nom de plume commonly used by J. J. Moncrieef who was from the Shetland Islands), the author provided an excerpt from a letter that had some Bungi.

I met a "nattive" from down the river Clandeboye way yesterday on the streets. We chatted of "ould" times. He relapsed into the lingo and I mentioned the number of fisherman caught on the ice. "Yes," he said, "what a fun the peppers are having about it. I mind when I was a small saver, my faather and some of the byes round out the ice and sate, our nates. Ould One-Button sayed it was going to be cowld. I think me its the awnly time he was wrong, for by gos all quick like a southwaste wind come up and cracked the ice right off, and first thing quick like we were rite out in the lake whatever. It was a pretty ackward place to een, I tell you. The piece we were all on started rite away for the upsit side of the lake, away for Balsam Bay. We put of sales, blankets and buffalo robs to help us get there quicker like. When we hit the sore, we drov rite off the ice. One of the byes went chimmuck, be we got him out alrite.

We drove up to Selcrick on the cross side and crossed the rivver right at the gutway above St. Peters cherch. Oh yes, bye, we got hom alrite; we had to swim our harses. There was nothing in the pepper about it, whatever. We all had quite a funn about it at the dance that nite.

So long bye

P.S. I thought this would interest you in your ould age bye.

— Old Timer (J. J. Moncrieef), Winnipeg Evening Tribune.

=== Examples from Osborne Scott's Red River Dialect article ===
Osborne Scott gave a talk on the radio at CKY on December 7, 1937, about Bungi (the talk was later published in the Winnipeg Evening Tribune on December 12, 1937, with the title Red River Dialect and again as a slightly longer article in 1951 in The Beaver, also with the title of Red River Dialect).

John James Corrigal and WIllie George Linklater were sootin the marse The canoe went apeechequanee. The watter was sallow watefer, but Willie George kept bobbin up and down callin "O Lard save me." John James was topside the canoe souted to Willie and sayed, "Never min the Lard just now, Willie, grab for the willows."

— Osborne Scott, Winnipeg Evening Tribune.

Another story was recounted in the same article.

Willie Brass, Hudson's Bay Co. servant, was an Orkneyman who married an Eskimo woman in the north and retired to the Red River Settlement. He got home from the fort one night a little worse for wear with acute indigestion. He went to bed but kept waking, asking Eliza his wife for a drink of hot water saying "Strick a lite, you'll see I'm dying Eliza, and get me a drink, I'm dying." She did strike a light and got him hot water three or four times. Finally she got fed up and said to him, "Awe Willie I'm just slocked it the lite. Can't you die the daark?"

— Osborne Scott, Winnipeg Evening Tribune.

Scott also recounted a discussion that he had overheard.

I overheard this in our kitchen—the servant next door had come over to visit:

"Sit down girl Mary; you'll see I'll make a cup a tea."

"Oh Eliza girl, I'll not can, I'm got to get hom."

"Keeyam getting hom. Sit down. Take off your saul and I'll put on kettle."

"Aw Eliza I'll not can—I'm got Jane Mary's bodice on and it'll not can meet."

— Osborne Scott, Winnipeg Evening Tribune.

Scott also recounted a discussion that he had been a part of.

Willie met me at the Selkirk station to drive me to St. Peter's rectory. This conversation ensued: "come on boy, I'm got the horse tied upset the hotel."

We were no sooner seated in the buggy than he started, "Bye, did you hear about the elecsuns last week?"

"No Willie, Dominion, provincial or municipal?"

"Hell no, tsurch. I was runnin' for waarden. The meeting was in tsurch. Your father was in the tsair. Kilpun was running against me. Mind you boy, your faather was in the tsair. He was just about to take the vot when that fellow Kiplun got up. Oh that's Kiplun opting watter from the rivver he lives in that little house with the smok coming out of the chimney now. Yes mind you boy that fella Kiplun got right up in the meeting. Your faather boy was in the tsair and you know what Kiplun sayed? He sayed, 'Willie,'

" 'Yes, Kiplun.'

" 'What did you do with that coil oil?'

" 'What coil oil, Kiplun?'

" 'The coil oil you took out of the tsurch and barned in yore on hom.'

"By gos boy I lost the elecsun right there. By Jewpiter I'm got to hurry. Kiplun an me is going to the marse sootin this evening."

— Osborne Scott, Winnipeg Evening Tribune.

In the same article, Scott provided a few more examples and definitions of words:

- "'Bye me I kakatch [nearly] killed it two ducks with wan sot.'"
- "'Keeyam' meaning never mind, let it go. 'Girl Keeyam if you take my neechimos (sweetheart) I'll get me another whatefer!'"
- "'Chimmuck," one of those words whose sound suits the sense, represents the sound a stone makes when falling perpendicular into water, for instance, 'he fell off the rock chimmuck in lake.'"
- "'The canoe went apeechequanee and they went chimmuck,' apeechequanee meaning head over heels."
- "'I know by where there is a fine bus of neepinnans (high bush cranberries).'"
- "Paper and pepper were pronounced 'pepper,' and you indicated whether it was eating or writing that you wanted."
- "Some French words were incorporated in the dialect, as for instance, a trunk or box was a 'cassette.'"
- "The Scots word 'byre' was always used instead of stable or cowshead."
- "They never put out a fire or candle, it was always 'slocked.'"
- "'Mooneas' was one Cree word which was used to great effect by the native. It means greenhorn or newcomer."

Scott said that First Nations words were used in Bungi most often as "picturesque short words, generally exclamatory". In addition, the names of birds, animals, and plants were commonly First Nations words, as these things were new to the immigrants.

In a later, updated version of the article in 1951 that included parts of the original radio broadcast that were not in The Winnipeg Evening Tribune article, Osborne also told of a young Canon M. Sanderson learning to pronounce [s] and [š] under the tutelage of Rev. S. P. Matheson. When Sanderson was working with Rev. J. J. Anderson as his assistant, Anderson reported to Matheson that he had overdone it—instead of saying "God save the Queen," Sanderson had said "God shave the Queen." However, Sanderson would discredit this idea in a letter to the editor, called Canon Sanderson Drops into Red River Dialect in response to Osborne's 1937 article ad radio address, and also included some examples of words in Bungi.

=== Examples from letters in support of Osborne Scott ===
In a letter to the editor titled Aw, My Fer You, Osborne Scott!, an anonymous person using the pseudonym Bung-gay (a nom de plume for Islay Mary (Charles) Sinclair, who was said could not speak Bungi but rather imitate it from having lived in the community for a long time) wrote a letter to the editor in Bungi that Blain named the McBean Letter. The letter was in response to an irate letter titled Not Offensive to Red River Descendants about Scott's article submitted by Mrs. A. Kipling on January 7, 1938. Kipling felt that Scott had belittled and insulted the Bungi speakers of the Red River, when in fact Osborne and another contributor (likely Mr. J. J. Moncrieff under the pseudonym An Old Timer) were saddened by the vanishing of Bungi and that their children would not know the accents and dialect, and wanted to remember the humour as well.

Aw, my fer you, Osborne Scott, ye s'ould be properly as-s'améd of yerself, ye dirty tras', insultin' decent people from the Ruvver, dsust like as if ye aren't one yerself, in yer Englis' s'oes and tseckered suit, an' like as if ye never saw a byre yerself, or slocked a lantern!

Perhaps even you think ye're smaart, like a stupid ass, but when you to Tsarts on Sunday, you'll-see, the people'll be maarkin' at ye, and ye'll be wis'in' ye could go in hindside farmost, like as if you were insteppéd already!

* * *

Boy, whatever! When you were sittin' in a bott, fis'in' fer Dsack-fis' among the wullows on the Red Ruvver, you never thought some day ye'd be warkin' fer the P.C.R. an' sittin' opp-site Can-ay-dsens, did you?

Stop first, ye'll-see, I'm got in my green boax under the baid, pictsers s'owin' you playin' Cricket with a white peak-ed cap on yer heid, dsust like you were a dsentleman. But you got dsust as sock-sweated playin' a "dsentleman's game" as ever ye did kickin' a stinkin'-hide football over a byre! "Dsentleman's Game," indeed! Aw-hoi fer you, Osborne Scott!

* * *

Lemme-see, you mind the time ye took me to a daance, in a boab-sleigh, an' ye were wearin' a biled sart and yer beef-hide s'oes, an' it was so cauld yer nozz started runnin' like a soogar-tree, an' I had to lawn ye my strippéd sas' to wipe it on! Good thing ye didn't take cauld that night, boy, an' be like Sall-ee, when they tole her ould man s'e died from want o' breath, he says: "Oh, no, Boy!—s'e was breathen' when s'e died!" Or like yer poop Uncle, too, Boy—when he got cauld—one day he was alive, an' the next he was a caark!

* * *

I'm not got a fifty-cent-bit dsust no, Boy, but I'll bet a s'illin's warth o' sweeties at the karner staure that ye often think long o' th' ould Red Ruvver, an' wis'in' ye was back pickin' Tseepo nuts an' seekin' yer ould red cow 'wid spots-now-an'-agian'!

Aw-hoi, fer you! Osborne Scott, speakin' on the Raddio. I think me ye're dsust tryin' to s'ow off!

— Bung-gay (Islay Mary Sinclair), Winnipeg Evening Tribune.

In another letters to the editor in support of Scott, called Oldtimer Appreciates Osborne Scott's Article, Mary I. Kennedy contributed examples of Bungi:

- "'I'll not can do it me, whatever but.' Expressive of utter impossibility."
- "A man of the country was in the hospital for some time, and a friends called to see him. 'You got a garden, bye?' 'Eh! Eh! A fine garden and suts fine celery. Bye, you never seen suts fine celery. My faather's buried somewhere about here.'"
- "Then John exclaimed 'Tgh high! (pronounced as in light) I nuvvur see such a what fur a ox."

She also included a few stories of nicknames, such as a family by the name of Johnstone who were christened with "Teapot" for their addiction to tea, which was more familiar and seen as a distinguishing mark for them.

=== Example from discussion of Victoria Cottage (Bunn House) ===
Another example of Bungi with a standard English translation is provided through Red River North Heritage as a part of their geocache work. This is Rachel Bunn telling the story of how her husband, Thomas Bunn, built a stone house known as Victoria Cottage (which is now a historic site). A modern recording of this being spoken is also available on the Red River North Heritage website. The exact origin of this text is not provided.

Oh, aye, djust down the road, you know

Aloang the ruvver

Me Thomas thur built ma a hoose so solid he built it.

Twill aver stand foraver, aim thinkin!

Siu(r) as me name is Rachel Bunn

Samuel Taylor put a handle on it een sixta-too ye-naw-see.

Every marnin back and fore he come across from the stone fort—he worked thur but.

He built the English tsarts you know on the cross side.

Loang-headed is my Thomas Bunn is loang-headed.

Me hoose, mind dese wallis are stone and tree foot tick you know.

I's taired of the fluudis.

Aye, so calm this ruvvers bein no, doon be fooled!

Come sprink this ruvvers hes a- vurra wicket

Upsouth een Kildonan, and didn't thut ruvver nigh on took our hoose een the big fluud of fifta-too

Mana people lost everythink.

Oh ma hairt ake-it! We fled maina males to the paines and had a sweet time.

Mind, tanks to my Thomas Bunn, fein and coomfortable we are sertently and saiventa foot haigh from the ruvver—we'll not fluid ere.
Oh, yes, just down the road

By the river

My Thomas built me a solid house.

I'm sure it will stand forever, I think!

Sure as my name is Rachel Bunn.

Samuel Taylor put the finishing touches on it in 1862.

Every morning back and forth he came across the river from Lower Fort Garry, where he worked.

He built St Clements Mapleton church across the river.

My Thomas Bunn is a visionary

My house, the walls are stone and three feet thick!

I was tired of the floods.

So calm this Red River is but don't be fooled!

Come spring the river is very ill-tempered!

South of us, when we were upriver in Kildonan, the river nearly took our house in the big flood in 1852.

Many people lost everything.

Oh the heart ache! We fled many miles to the high ground at Bird's Hill and had a difficult time.

Now thanks to Thomas we are certainly comfortable seventy feet above the river and will never flood again!

—Rachel Bunn, via Red River North Heritage

=== The Shtory of Little Red Ridin Hood ===
D. A. Mulligan wrote the story of Little Red Riding Hood as it would have been told in Bungi, titled The Shtory of Little Red Ridin Hood].

=== Blain's thesis The Bungee Dialect of the Red River Settlement ===
In her thesis, The Bungee Dialect of the Red River Settlement, Eleanor Blain provides an extensive discussion on Bungi, with examples of words and phrases used in Bungi, as well as a transcription of Walters' story This is What I'm Thinkin as part of an appendix (both a linguistic version and a reading version).

=== Walters' Bungi audio collection ===
Frank Walters was a historian that was interested in preserving Bungi heritage. He conducted a study of Bungi, and made a series of recordings known as the Bungee Collection (also known as the Walters Collection).

== Notable Bungi speakers ==
- Manitoba Premier John Norquay

== See also ==
- Anglo-Métis
- Beurla Reagaird
- Canadian Gaelic
- Chinook Jargon
- Métis National Council
- Michif language
- Newfoundland Irish
- Red River Colony
- Scots language
- Scottish Gaelic
- Scottish Indian trade
