= Michif =

Mixed language of the Métis people

- Michif
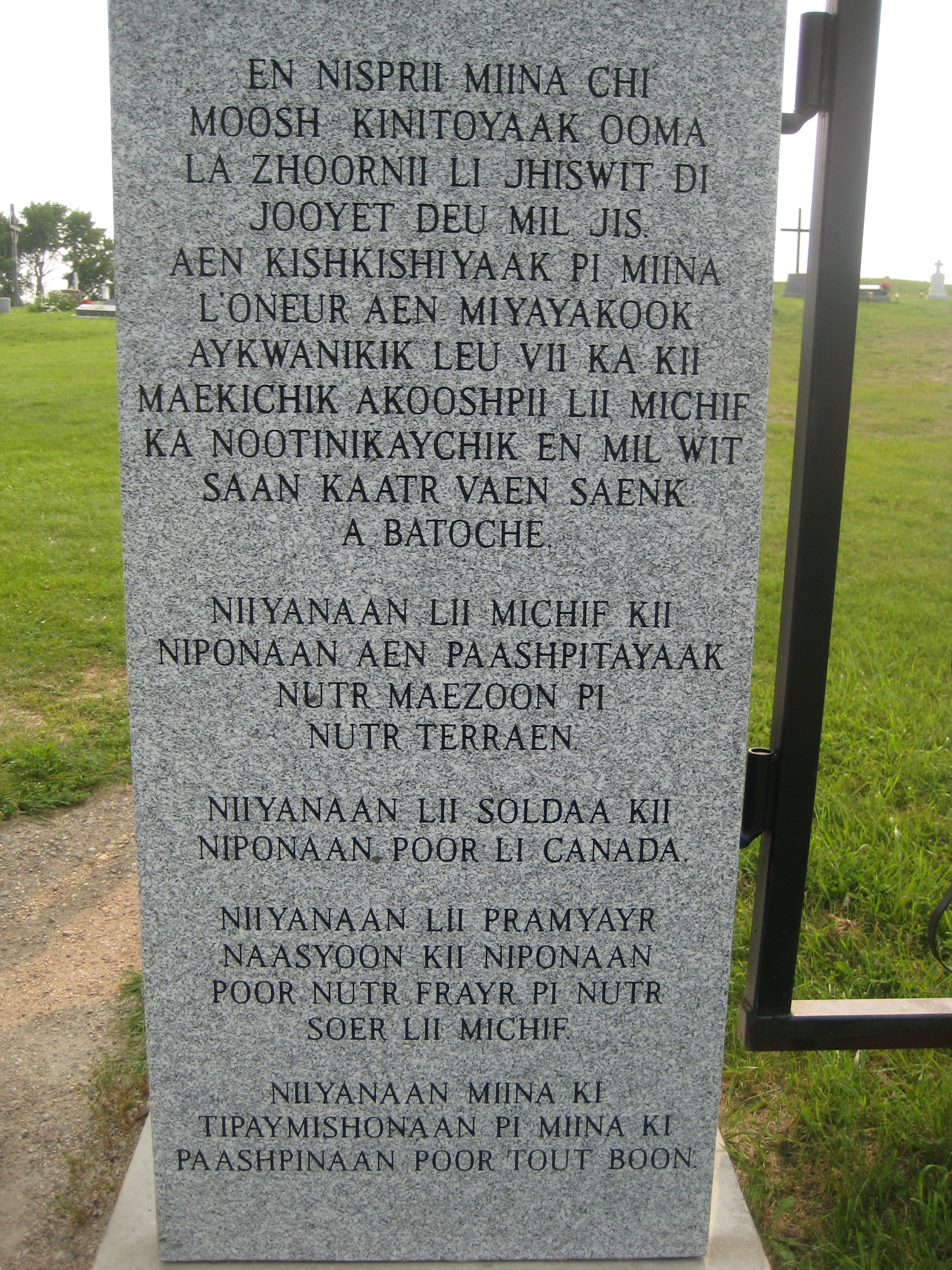
- Michif engraving at Batoche, Saskatchewan
- Native to: Canada
- Region: Métis communities in the Prairies; mostly Manitoba, Alberta, Saskatchewan Northeastern British Columbia and Northwestern Ontario, Turtle Mountain Indian Reservation in North Dakota
- Native speakers: 1,800 (2021 census)
- Language family: Mixed Plains Cree–Métis French
- Writing system: Latin

Language codes
- ISO 639-3: crg
- Glottolog: mich1243
- ELP: Michif
- Michif is classified as Critically Endangered by the UNESCO Atlas of the World's Languages in Danger.

Métis "mixed"
- People: Métis
- Language: Michif; Métis French; Hand Talk
- Country: Michif Piyii

Michif (also Mitchif, Mechif, Michif-Cree, Métif, Métchif, French Cree) is one of the languages of the Métis people of Canada and the United States, who are the descendants of First Nations (mainly Cree, Nakota, and Ojibwe) and fur trade workers of European ancestry (mainly French). The fathers of the Metis Nation were also known as voyageurs, the expert canoeists whose main occupation involved traveling long distances and trading with First Nations. This occupation also required forging relationships and common language with Indigenous contacts. The voyageurs and Indigenous women began intermarrying as early as the 1780s and 1790s, combining predominantly Catholic French culture with First Nations culture. Michif emerged in the early 19th century as a mixed language and adopted a consistent character between about 1820 and 1840.

The geographical distribution of Metis communities has resulted in the formation of multiple dialects of Metis languages, as well as multiple names for said dialects. Michif is the most common title of this language. One form of Michif combines Cree and Métis French, a variety of Canadian French, with some additional borrowing from English and indigenous languages of the Americas such as Ojibwe and Assiniboine. It is widely accepted that the Algonquian language family contributed both Cree and Ojibwe, while the settlers introduced French, and to a lesser degree English. Peter Bakker contributed a foundational work to the study of Michif, but Metis scholars have argued that his research poorly understood their language and culture, and should therefore be examined critically, especially as it relates to phonology and syntax. In general, Michif noun phrase phonology, lexicon, morphology, and syntax are derived from Métis French, while verb phrase phonology, lexicon, morphology, and syntax are from a southern variety of Plains Cree (a western dialect of Cree). Articles and adjectives are also of Métis French origin but demonstratives are from Plains Cree.

The Michif language is unusual among mixed languages, in that rather than forming a simplified grammar, it developed by incorporating complex elements of the chief languages from which it was born. French-origin noun phrases retain lexical gender and adjective agreement; Cree-origin verbs retain much of their polysynthetic structure. This suggests that instead of haltingly using words from another's tongue, the people who gradually came to speak Michif were fully fluent in both French and Cree.

The Michif language was first brought to scholarly attention in 1976 by John Crawford at the University of North Dakota. Much of the subsequent research on Michif was also related to UND, including four more pieces by Crawford, plus work by Evans, Rhodes, and Weaver.

== Etymology ==
The word Michif is from a variant pronunciation of the French word Métis. Some Métis people prefer this word (Michif) to describe their nationality when speaking English and use it for anything related to Métis people, including any languages they happen to speak. According to the Gabriel Dumont Institute (GDI), the word Michif, when used for a language, is used to describe at least three distinct types of speech. Northern Michif (in Saskatchewan) is essentially a variety of Cree with a small number of French loanwords. Michif French is a variety of Canadian French with some Cree loanwords and syntax (word order). Michif used without any qualification can also describe the mixed language which borrows heavily from both Cree and French. According to theories of self-determination and self-identification, the GDI refers to all of these speech varieties as Michif because many Métis community members use the term that way, even though these varieties are widely different in their linguistic details. The remainder of this article deals primarily with the mixed language that has many features from both French and Cree.

== History ==
=== Language genesis: A case of contact ===
Jean Teillet, an academic, lawyer and member of the Metis Nation, describes how the Métis identity formed in her book The North-West is our Mother: The Story of Louis Riel's People, The Métis Nation. She specifies that the men who married Indigenous women and "went free" with their families into the Prairies occupied a unique social position and culture. Voyageur culture was oriented around oral story telling, songs, and often featured dramatic performances and passionate tales of heroism to be shared in canoes or around campfires. While the term had been used to refer to fur traders and travelers of the North-West, voyageur would come to describe the canoeists navigating The Voyageur Highway, which spanned from the Great Lakes, through Rupertsland, to the modern North-West Territories. Intermarriages between these voyageurs and Indigenous women began as early as the 1780s and 90s. Thus, The Voyageur Highway supported the birth of a nation by connecting people who would develop the rich Metis culture and language. The brotherhood of the voyageurs consisted of mainly Catholic French Canadians, and likely a few contributions from men of Scottish and English backgrounds. Language was a powerful tool for these men, their joyful songs allowed them to coordinate the speed of their paddle strokes, measure time, and most importantly connect with and motivate each other in harsh conditions. The women responsible for the genesis of the Metis Nation were young members of the Indigenous bands the voyageurs traded. The formation of these new relations and families necessitated communication, and in this case generated a new mixed language: Michif.

In languages of mixed ethnicities, the language of the mother usually provides the grammatical system, while the language of the father provides the lexicon. The reasons are as follows: children tend to know their mother's language better; in the case of the Métis, the men were often immigrants, whereas the women were native to the region. If the bilingual children need to use either of their parents' languages to converse with outsiders, it is most likely to be the language of their mothers. Thus, the model of language-mixing predicts that Michif should have a Cree grammatical system and French lexicon. Michif, however, has Cree verb phrases and French noun phrases. The explanation for this unusual distribution of Cree and French elements in Michif lies in the polysynthetic nature of Cree morphology. In Cree, verbs can be very complex with up to twenty morphemes, incorporated nouns and unclear boundaries between morphemes. In other words, in Cree verbs it is very difficult to separate grammar from lexicon. As a result, in Michif the grammatical and bound elements are almost all Cree, and the lexical and free elements are almost all French; verbs are almost totally Cree, because the verb consists of grammatical and bound elements. Seen in this way, it can be argued that Michif is fundamentally Cree, but with heavy French borrowing (somewhat like Maltese, a mixed Arabic-Italian language classified as fundamentally Arabic). The Métis in addition have their own variety of French with Cree borrowings – Métis French.

==== Language genesis from Michif people ====
A tale of the genesis of the Michif peoples and language has been passed through generations. The story of the creation of the Michif people and their language was told to Elder Brousse Flammand (as of 2020 the president of the Michif kaa-piikishkwaychik, or Michif Speakers Association) by his grandparents (born 1876 and 1886). He states that the genesis of the Michif person/nation is synonymous with the genesis of the Michif language. Both the language and the nation are creations of the Creator/God—and are symbiotic to each other. The information he gives is also told by other Michif speakers, who agree that the language was given to the Michif peoples by the Creator/God.

The creation of a specific language for Metis people allowed for a collective identity, where Michif speakers could take action together to protect traditional territories and homelands, and share a collective history.

=== Usage ===
In 2021, the number of Michif speakers in Canada was reported to be 1,845. However, the number of fluent Michif speakers is estimated at fewer than 1,000. It was probably double or triple this number at the close of the 19th century, but never much higher. Currently, Michif is spoken in scattered Métis communities in the Canadian prairie provinces of Saskatchewan, Manitoba, and Alberta, and in North Dakota in the U.S.. There are about 50 speakers in Alberta, all over age 60. There are some 230 speakers of Michif in the United States (down from 390 at the 1990 census), most of whom live in North Dakota, particularly in the Turtle Mountain Indian Reservation. There are around 300 Michif speakers in the Northwest Territories, northern Canada.

=== Loss of language ===
In 2011, Statistics Canada reported 640 Michif speakers, located mainly in Saskatchewan (40.6%), Manitoba (26.6%), and Alberta (11.7%). In the cross-reference provided by Statistics Canada, it is shown that of these 640 speakers, only 30 are below 24 years of age. Furthermore, only 85 people declared Michif to be their main home language (45 their sole language); and of these, 65 were 50 or older. Unfortunately, these numbers do not reflect the actual number of speakers of the mixed variety of Michif in Canada, since the statistical survey did not differentiate between regional differences, including Michif Cree, Michif French, or mixed Michif.

In Metis communities, there has been a clear shift towards the European languages. As of 2019, all Michif speakers are also fluent (if not dominant) in English, and Metis adult and youth speak English (or French and English) as their first language(s). The reason why Michif has so few speakers and is in need of active revitalization efforts is a direct result of colonialism. Judy Iseke, an Albertan Metis scholar, argues that "language shift towards English and other colonial languages in Indigenous communities was not a 'natural' process but rather was a shift towards the decline of Indigenous languages, propelled by colonial schooling designed to 'civilize' Indigenous children and turn them into citizens conforming to 'white' standards."

=== Language revitalization ===
Revitalizing the Michif language is important to Métis people. Language is regarded as culturally significant and holds more value than just the attributes studied by linguists. Elder Brousse Flammand writes "Language is central to nationhood" and that "A government cannot legislate this identity and nationhood; the government can only recognize what is already in existence." Michif was (and is) central to the independent culture and nationhood of the Métis people. The Métis community is working toward language revitalization to keep this connection to their independent culture and nationhood.

Métis cultural centres such as the Michif Cultural and Métis Resource Institute in St. Albert, Alberta, the Métis Culture and Heritage Resource Centre in Winnipeg, and the Gabriel Dumont Institute of Native Studies and Applied Research are attempting to revive the language through public outreach. Additionally, The Louis Riel Institute (LRI), which is the education department of the Manitoba Metis Federation in Winnipeg, is an adult learning center committed to the development of community based educational programs directed to adults and the whole family. The Institute has released DVD beginner lessons for both Michif and Michif French, which are also available online. The Metis National Council launched a Roblox game to teach Northern, Southern and French Michif to children through an immersive learning experience online called Metis Life.

As of 2013, the Northern Journal reports that "Aboriginal language and culture is becoming increasingly visible" in Alberta, as Alberta's Northland School Division, "serving mostly First Nations and Métis students in the northern part of the province" has expanded its community partnerships and culture camps.

== Phonology ==
Michif as recorded starting in the 1970s combined two separate phonological systems: one for French origin elements, and one for Cree origin elements. For instance, /f v l r/ exist only in French words, whereas preaspirated stops exist only in Cree words. In this variety of Michif, the French elements were pronounced in ways that have distinctively Canadian French values for the vowels, while the Cree elements have distinctively Cree values for vowels. Nonetheless, there is some Cree influence on French words in the stress system. But by the year 2000 there were Michif speakers who had collapsed the two systems into a single system.

=== Consonants ===
Consonants in Manitoba Michif
		Labial	Alveolar	Palatal (-alveolar)	Velar	Glottal
Nasal		m	n			
Plosive/ Affricate	tenuis	p	t	tʃ	k	
Plosive/ Affricate	preasp.	ʰp	ʰt	ʰtʃ	ʰk	
Plosive/ Affricate	voiced	b	d	dʒ	g	
Fricative	voiceless	f	s	ʃ		h
Fricative	voiced	v	z	ʒ		
Approximant		w	l	j		
Trill			r			

=== Vowels ===
Michif has eleven oral vowels and four nasal vowels.

Oral
	Front		Back
	unr.	rnd.	Back
Close	i	y	u
Near-close	ɪ		ʊ
Close-mid	e		o
Open-mid	ɛ	œ	ɔ
Open	a		ɑ

Nasal
	Front	Back
Close	ĩ	
Open-mid	ɛ̃	ɔ̃
Open		ɑ̃

=== Schwa-deletion ===
A schwa /ə/ appearing between two consonants in French-origin words is dropped in Michif. Examples of this process are listed in the table below.

/e/-deletion in Michif
French	Michif	English
chemin	shmen	'path'
cheveux	zhveu	'hair'
petit	pchi	'small'
cheval	zhwal	'horse'

=== Elision in Michif ===
Rosen states that since all French-derived vowel-initial nouns in Michif have been lexicalized as consonant-initial, the French rule of elision, which deletes certain vowels (particularly schwa) before vowel-initial words, for ex., le copain 'the friend' but l'ami 'the friend'), cannot apply in Michif. Curiously, she admits that elision is potentially still active since vowel-initial English loanwords allow elision, as in aen bol d'oatmeal 'a bowl of oatmeal'. Papen has countered that elision is, in fact, just as active in French-derived words as is liaison. For example, he examines Noun + di + Noun constructions (as in mwaa di zhanvjii vs. mwaa d'oktob 'month of January' vs. 'month of October') and finds that 100% of /i/ (from French schwa) are deleted before French-derived vowel-initial nouns. However, elision does not occur before Cree vowel-initial nouns. This strongly suggests that French phonological rules, such as liaison and elision still function in Michif, but that they apply only to French-derived words and not to Cree-derived ones, implying that Michif phonology is at least partially stratified, contrary to what Rosen (2007) proposes.

=== Liaison consonants ===
In French, a liaison is used to bridge the gap between word-final and word-initial vowel sounds. Whether liaison still exists in Michif is a much discussed theoretical issue. Scholars such as Bakker, Rhodes, and Rosen have suggested that liaison no longer exists in Michif and that all words that etymologically began with a vowel in French now begin with a consonant, the latter resulting from a variety of sources, including a liaison consonant. Their arguments are based on the fact that the expected liaison consonant (for example, /n/) will not show up and instead, the consonant will be /z/, as in in zur 'a bear' The above authors cite over a dozen words with an unexpected initial consonant. Papen has countered this argument by showing that, statistically, the vast majority of so-called initial consonants in Michif reflect the expected liaison consonant and that only about 13% of so-called initial consonants are unexpected. Moreover, Papen points out that one of the so-called initial consonant is /l/, which in nearly all cases, represents the elided definite article l (from li), in which case it cannot be a liaison consonant, since liaison consonants may not have grammatical or semantic meaning. Thus in a sequence such as larb the meaning is not simply 'tree' but 'the tree', where initial l has the meaning of 'the', and /l/ is initial only in a phonetic sense, but not in a phonological one, since it represents a distinct morpheme from arb, and thus arb must be considered phonologically vowel-initial.

Liaison consonants in Michif
French	Michif	English
arbre	zarbr	'tree'
étoile	zetwel	'star'
œuf	zoeuf	'egg'
os	zo	'bone'
oignon	zawyoun	'onion'

=== Palatalization ===
The voiced alveolar stop /d/ in French-origin words is palatalized to /dʒ/ in Michif, as in Acadian French. This may occur word-initially or word-internally before front vowels.

Palatalization of /d/ in Michif
French	Michif	English
dix	jis	'ten'
diable	jiab	'devil'
dieu	Bon Jeu	'God'
mardi	marji	'Tuesday'
radis	rawjee	'radish'
diner	jinee	'dinner'
dimanche	jimawnsh	'Sunday'

== Orthography ==
Michif lacks a unified spelling standard. Aside from local language differences, lack of a uniform spelling system can be attributed to Michif's history as an oral language. Generally, Michif-speaking communities spell words as they are pronounced in regional dialects, creating much variation in spelling. Some systems are phonetic, with each letter having only one sound (often based on English standards), while other are etymological, with French-derived words spelled by French standards, and Cree-derived words spelled using the "Standard Roman Orthography" system.

In 2004, Robert Papen proposed a new system that was mostly phonetic.

The government of Manitoba published a translation of its annual report on The Path to Reconciliation Act in Michif in June 2017. Its choice of spelling system can be seen in this extract:

"Chimooshakinitoohk" aen itwayhk Kwaayeshchi Kanawaapinitoohk, chi nishtotaatoohk paarmii lii atoktonn pi lii blaan pour chi ooshitaahk chi li Trustiihk, mina kayaash chi nishtotamihk ka kii itawyhk mina chi kii kayhk pi mina kaahkiiyow chi maamoo atooshkayhk.

Here, as in Papen's system, different vowel qualities are marked by writing the character doubled ("a" vs. "aa") instead of using diacritical marks as usual for Cree. For consistency, this system is also extended to the French-derived words so that French les blancs ('whites') becomes lii blaan but les autochtones ('the indigenous [people]') becomes lii atoktonn.

== Syntax ==
Contrary to Bakker's split phonology hypothesis, later analysis did not find evidence to support divergent phonological rules. Instead, recent research has argued that syntax may be of issue in the mixing of Cree and French, meaning that the semantics of Cree and French may be at odds with each other in terms of the mass/count distinction in both languages. The behaviour of nouns from Indo-European languages distinguishes between mass and count, whereas Algonquian is argued not to make this distinction. Evidence suggests that the syntactic makeup of Michif aligns with the features of whichever language contributed the noun, where Michif nouns descending from Algonquian follow Algonquian conventions, and those descending from Europe follow Indo-European conventions.

=== Noun phrase ===
Nouns are almost always accompanied by a French-origin determiner or a possessive.

English	French	Michif
a gun	un fusil /œ̃ fyzi/	aeñ fiizii
a house	une maison /yn mɛzɔ̃/	aen meezoñ
the boy	le garçon /lə ɡarsɔ̃/	li garsoñ
the rock	la roche /la ʁɔʃ/	la rosh
the knives	les couteaux /le kuto/	lii kutu
his (her) food	son manger /sɔ̃ mɑ̃ʒe/	su mañzhii
his (her) hand	sa main /sa mɛ̃/	sa maeñ
my dogs	mes chiens /me ʃjɛ̃/	mii shyaeñ

Cree-origin demonstratives can be added to noun phrases, in which case the Cree gender (animate or inanimate) is that of the corresponding Cree noun.

English	French	Michif	Plains Cree
this boy	ce garçon-là	awa li garsoñ	awa nâpêsis (animate)
this egg	cet œuf-là	ôma li zaef	ôma wâwi (inanimate)
this rock	cette roche-là	awa la rosh	awa asinîy (animate)
those men (over there)	ces hommes-là	neekik lii zom	nêkik nâpêwak (animate)

Adjectives are French-origin (Cree has no adjectives), and as in French they are either pre- or postnominal. Prenominal adjectives agree in gender (like French), however, postnominal adjectives do not agree in gender (unlike French).

=== Verb phrase ===
The verb phrase is that of Plains Cree-origin with little reduction (there are no dubitative or preterit verb forms). French verb stems may even be conjugated with Cree prefixes and suffixes. For example, brod in Ni-miyeeht-een ee-li-brod-ii-yaan is from the French verb broder (to embroider in English).

=== Word order ===
Michif word order is basically that of Cree (relatively free). However, the more French-origin elements are used, the closer the syntax seems to conform to norms of spoken French.

== Vocabulary ==
A comparison of some common words in English, French, Michif, and Cree:

English	French	Michif	Cree
one	un	haen, peeyak	pêyak
two	deux	deu	nîso
three	trois	trwaa	nisto
four	quatre	kaet	nêwo
five	cinq	saenk	niyânan
man	homme (l'homme)	lom	nâpêw
dog	chien	shyaeñ, shyen	atim
sun	soleil	saley	pîsim
water	eau (de l'eau)	dilo	nipiy
white	blanc	blañ	wâpiskâw
yellow	jaune	zhun	osâwâw
red	rouge	ruzh	mihkwâw
black	noir	nwer	kaskitêwâw
eat	manger	miichishow; miitshow	mîcisow
see	voir	waapow	wâpiw
hear	entendre	peehtam	pêhtam
sing	chanter	nakamow	nikamow
leave	partir	shipweeteew; atishipweeteew	(ati-)sipwêhtêw

=== Lexicon ===
Nouns: 83–94% French-origin; others are mostly Cree-origin, Ojibwe-origin, or English-origin
Verbs: 88–99% Cree-origin
Question words: Cree-origin
Personal pronouns: Cree
Postpositions: Cree-origin
Prepositions: French-origin
Conjunctions: 55% Cree-origin; 40% French-origin
Numerals: French-origin
Demonstratives: Cree-origin

== Sample text ==
The Lord's Prayer in English, French, and Michif:

Michif	French	English
Toñ Periinaan	Notre Père	Our Father
Toñ Periinaan, dañ li syel kayaayeen kiichitwaawan toñ noo. Kiiya kaaniikaanishtaman peetoteiie kaandaweetaman taatochiikateew ota dañ la ter taapishkoch dañ li syel. Miinaan anoch moñ paeñiinaan poneeiiminaan kamachitotamaak, niishtanaan nkaponeemaanaanik anikee kaakiimaiitotaakoyaakuk kayakochii'inaan, maaka pashpii'inaan aayik ochi maachiishiiweepishiwin. Answichil.	Notre Père, qui es aux cieux, Que ton nom soit sanctifié, Que ton règne vienne, Que ta volonté soit faite Sur la terre comme au ciel. Donne-nous aujourd’hui notre pain de ce jour Pardonne-nous nos offenses, Comme nous pardonnons aussi à ceux qui nous ont offensés, Et ne nous soumets pas à la tentation, Mais délivre-nous du mal. Ainsi soit-il.	Our Father, who art in Heaven, Hallowed be thy Name. Thy Kingdom come. Thy will be done, on earth as it is in Heaven. Give us this day our daily bread. And forgive us our trespasses, As we forgive those who trespass against us And lead us not into temptation; But deliver us from evil. Amen.

== See also ==
- Bungi Creole
- Chinook Jargon
- Journal of Indigenous Studies
- Lists of extinct languages
- Lists of endangered languages
- Lists of languages

== Bibliography ==
- Barkwell, Lawrence J.; Dorion, Leah; Hourie, Audreen (2006). Métis Legacy: Michif Culture, Heritage, and Folkways. Métis Legacy Series. Vol. 2. Saskatoon: Gabriel Dumont Institute. ISBN 0-920915-80-9.
- Barkwell, L.J., ed. (2004). La Lawng: Michif Peekishkwewin, The Heritage Language of the Canadian Metis, Volume One, Language Practice. Winnipeg: Pemmican Publications. ISBN 1894717228.
- Barkwell, L.J., ed. (2004). La Lawng: Michif Peekishkwewin, The Heritage Language of the Canadian Metis, Volume Two, Language Theory. Winnipeg: Pemmican Publications. ISBN 1894717287.
- Barkwell, Lawrence J.; Dorion, Leah; Prefontaine, Darren (2001). Metis Legacy: A Historiography and Annotated Bibliography. Winnipeg / Saskatoon: Pemmican Publications Inc. / Gabriel Dumont Institute. ISBN 1-894717-03-1.
- Bakker, Peter (2004). "Spelling Systems for Michif: An Overview". In Barkwell, Lawrence (ed.). La Lawng: Michif Peekishkwewin. The Heritage Language of the Canadian Metis. Vol. 2: Language Theory. Winnipeg, Manitoba, Canada: Pemmican Publications/Manitoba Métis Federation Michif Language Program. pp. 11–28. ISBN 1-894717-28-7.
- Bakker, Peter (2004). "The Michif Language of the Métis". In Barkwell, Lawrence (ed.). La Lawng: Michif Peekishkwewin. The Heritage Language of the Canadian Metis. Vol. 2: Language Theory. Winnipeg, Manitoba, Canada: Pemmican Publications/Manitoba Métis Federation Michif Language Program. pp. 5–9. ISBN 1-894717-28-7.
- Bakker, Peter (2004). "The Verb in Michif". In Barkwell, Lawrence (ed.). La Lawng: Michif Peekishkwewin. The Heritage Language of the Canadian Metis. Vol. 2: Language Theory. Winnipeg, Manitoba, Canada: Pemmican Publications/Manitoba Métis Federation Michif Language Program. pp. 63–80. ISBN 1-894717-28-7.
- Bakker, Peter (2004). "What is Michif?". In Barkwell, Lawrence (ed.). La Lawng: Michif Peekishkwewin. The Heritage Language of the Canadian Metis. Vol. 1: Language Practice. Winnipeg, Manitoba, Canada: Pemmican Publications/Manitoba Métis Federation Michif Language Program. pp. 5–7. ISBN 1-894717-22-8.
- Bakker, Peter; Barkwell, Lawrence (2004). "Storytelling and Mythology". In Barkwell, Lawrence (ed.). La Lawng: Michif Peekishkwewin. The Heritage Language of the Canadian Metis. Vol. 2: Language Theory. Winnipeg, Manitoba, Canada: Pemmican Publications/Manitoba Métis Federation Michif Language Program. pp. 83–96. ISBN 1-894717-28-7.
- Bakker, Peter (1997). A Language of Our Own: The Genesis of Michif, the Mixed Cree-French Language of the Canadian Métis. New York: Oxford University Press. doi:10.1093/oso/9780195097115.001.0001. ISBN 9780195097115.
- Bakker, Peter; Papen, Robert (1997). "Michif: A Mixed Language Based on Cree and French". In Thomason, Sarah G. (ed.). Contact Languages: A Wider Perspective. Philadelphia: John Benjamins. pp. 295–363. doi:10.1075/cll.17.12bak.
- Bloomfield, Leonard (1984). Cree-English Lexicon. New Haven, CT: Human Area Relations Files.
- Crawford, John (1983). "Speaking Michif in Four Métis Communities". Canadian Journal of Native Studies. 3 (1): 47–55.
- Crawford, John (1985). "What is Michif? Language in the Metis Tradition". In Brown, Jennifer S.H.; Peterson, Jacqueline (eds.). The New Peoples: Being and Becoming Metis in North America. pp. 231–241.
- Crawford, John (1973). "Linguistic and Sociolinguistic Relationships in the Michif Language". Proceedings of the Linguistic Circle of Manitoba and North Dakota. 3: 8–22.
- Evans, Donna (1982). "On Coexistence and Convergence of Two Phonological Systems in Michif". Work Papers of the Summer Institute of Linguistics, University of North Dakota Session. 26: 158–173. doi:10.31356/silwp.vol26.03.
- Fleury, N.; Barkwell, L.J. (2000). La Lawng: Michif Peekishkwewin: The Canadian Michif Language Dictionary. Winnipeg: Metis Resource Centre.
- Gillon, Carrie; Rosen, Nicole (2016). "Critical Mass in Michif". Journal of Pidgin and Creole Languages. 31 (1): 113–140. doi:10.1075/jpcl.31.1.05gil. ISSN 0920-9034.
- Papen, Robert (2003). "Michif: One Phonology or Two?". In Chung, Y.; Gillon, C.; Wokdak, R. (eds.). University of British Columbia Working Papers in Linguistics, Vol. 12, Proceedings of the Eighth Workshop on Structure and Constituency in Languages of the Americas. pp. 47–58.
- Papen, Robert (2004). "Michif Spelling Conventions: Proposal for a Unified Michif Writing System". In Barkwell, L. (ed.). La Lawng: Michif Peekishkwewin. Winnipeg, MB: Pemmican Publications. pp. 29–53. ISBN 9781894717229.
- Rhodes, Richard A. (1977). "French Cree—A Case of Borrowing". In Cowan, Wm. (ed.). Actes du Huitième Congrès des Algonquinistes. Ottawa: Carleton University. pp. 6–25.
- Rhodes, Richard A. (1986). "Métif—A Second Look". In Cowan, Wm. (ed.). Actes du Septième Congrès des Algonquinistes. Ottawa: Carleton University. pp. 287–296.
- Rhodes, Richard A. (1987). "Les Contes Metif—Metif Myths". In Cowan, Wm. (ed.). Papers of the Eighteenth Algonquian Conference. Ottawa: Carleton University. pp. 297–301.
- Rhodes, Richard A. (1992). "Language Shift in Algonquian". International Journal of the Sociology of Language. 93: 87–92.
- Rhodes, Richard A. (2001). "Text Strategies in Métchif". In Wolfart, H.C. (ed.). Papers of the Thirty-second Algonquian Conference. Winnipeg: University of Manitoba. pp. 455–469.
- Rosen, Nicole (2006). "Language Contact and Stress Assignment". Sprachtypologie und Universalienforschung. 59: 170–190.
- Rosen, Nicole (2007). Domains in Michif Phonology (PhD thesis). Department of Linguistics, University of Toronto. hdl:1807/122487.
- Rosen, Nicole L. (2008). "French-Algonquian interaction in Canada: A Michif case study". Journal of Language Contact. 2 (1): 9–32. doi:10.1163/000000008792525345.
- Papen, Robert (2005). "Le mitchif: langue franco-crie des Plaines". In Valdman, A.; Auger, J.; Piston-Hatlen, D. (eds.). Le français en Amérique du Nord: État présent. Saint-François, QC: Presses de l'Université Laval. pp. 327–347. ISBN 978-2-7637-1346-5.
- Weaver, Deborah (1982). "Obviation in Michif". Work Papers of the Summer Institute of Linguistics, University of North Dakota Session. 26: 174–262. doi:10.31356/silwp.vol26.06.
- Weaver, Deborah (1983). "The Effect of Language Change and Death on Obviation in Michif". In Cowan, W. (ed.). Actes du Quatorzième Congrès des Algonquinistes. Ottawa: Carleton University Press. pp. 261–268. doi:10.22215/algqp.v14i0.847.
- Zoldy, Grace (2003). "The Lord's Prayer". Li Liivr Oche Michif Ayamiiawina – The Book of Michif Prayers. Camperville Michif Cree Ritual Language Project.
- Barkwell, Lawrence J.; Fleury, Norman (2004). La Lawng: Michif Peekishkwewin: The Canadian Michif Language Dictionary. Winnipeg: Metis Resource Centre.
- Iseke, Judy M. (2013). "Negotiating Métis culture in Michif: disrupting Indigenous language shift". Decolonization: Indigeneity, Education & Society. 2 (2).
- Logan, Tricia (2015). "Settler colonialism in Canada and the Métis". Journal of Genocide Research. 17 (4): 433–452. doi:10.1080/14623528.2015.1096589. S2CID 74114618.
- Mazzoli, Maria (n.d.). "Challenges and opportunities for collaborative language research: The Michif case study". Journal of Postcolonial Linguistics.
- Mazzoli, Maria (2019). "Michif loss and resistance in four Metis communities. Kahkiyaw mashchineenaan, "All of us are disappearing as in a plague"". Zeitschrift für Kanada-Studien: 96–117.
- Papen, Robert (2014). "La liaison en mitchif : un cas d'acquisition incomplète fossilisée?". In Soum-Favaro, C.; Coquillon, A.; Chevrot, J.-P. (eds.). Liaison : Approches contemporaines. Berlin: Peter Lang. pp. 213–238.
- Papen, Robert A. (2017-02-07). Le mitchif: langue franco-crie des Plaines (in French). Presses de l'Université Laval. ISBN 978-2-7637-1346-5.
- Papen, Robert (2005b), "On developing a writing system for Michif", Linguistica atlantica, 26: 75–97
- Poplack, Shana (1993). "Variation theory and language contact: Concepts, methods and data". In Preston, Dennis R. (ed.). American Dialect Research. Amsterdam: John Benjamins. pp. 251–286.
- Teillet, Jean (2019). The North-West is our mother: the story of Louis Riel's people, the Métis Nation (First ed.). Toronto, Ontario, Canada: Patrick Crean Editions, an imprint of HarperCollins Publishers Ltd. ISBN 978-1-4434-5012-6.
