= Settler colonialism in Canada =

Settler colonialism in Canada refers to the process and effects of colonization on the Indigenous peoples of Canada. As colonization progressed, Indigenous peoples were subject to policies of forced assimilation and cultural genocide. Governments in Canada in many cases ignored or chose to deny the aboriginal title of First Nations. The traditional governance of many of the First Nations was replaced with government-imposed structures. Many Indigenous cultural practices were banned.

The relationship between Aboriginal Canadians and the Crown has been heavily defined by the effects of settler colonialism and Indigenous resistance. Canadian courts and recent governments have recognized and eliminated many discriminatory practices.

== Government policies ==
=== Doctrine of Discovery ===
The Catholic Doctrine of Discovery is a legal doctrine that Louise Mandell asserted is a justification for settler colonialism in Canada. The doctrine allowed Catholic European explorers to claim non-Christian lands for their monarch based on papal bulls. The doctrine was applied to the Americas when Pope Alexander VI issued Inter caetera in 1493, giving Spain title to "discoveries" in the New World. Spain, however, claimed only the Pacific coast of what is today Canada and, in 1789, established just the settlements of Santa Cruz de Nuca and Fort San Miguel, both of which were abandoned six years later.

In the 2004 case Tsilhqot'in Nation v British Columbia, the Supreme Court of Canada confirmed that "the doctrine of terra nullius never applied in Canada". Aboriginal title is a beneficial interest in land, although the Crown retains an underlying title. The court set out a number of conditions which must be met in order for the Crown to extinguish Aboriginal title. The court, 10 years later, in Tsilhqot'in Nation v. British Columbia, rejected all Crown arguments for Aboriginal title extinguishment.

=== The Royal Proclamation of 1763 ===
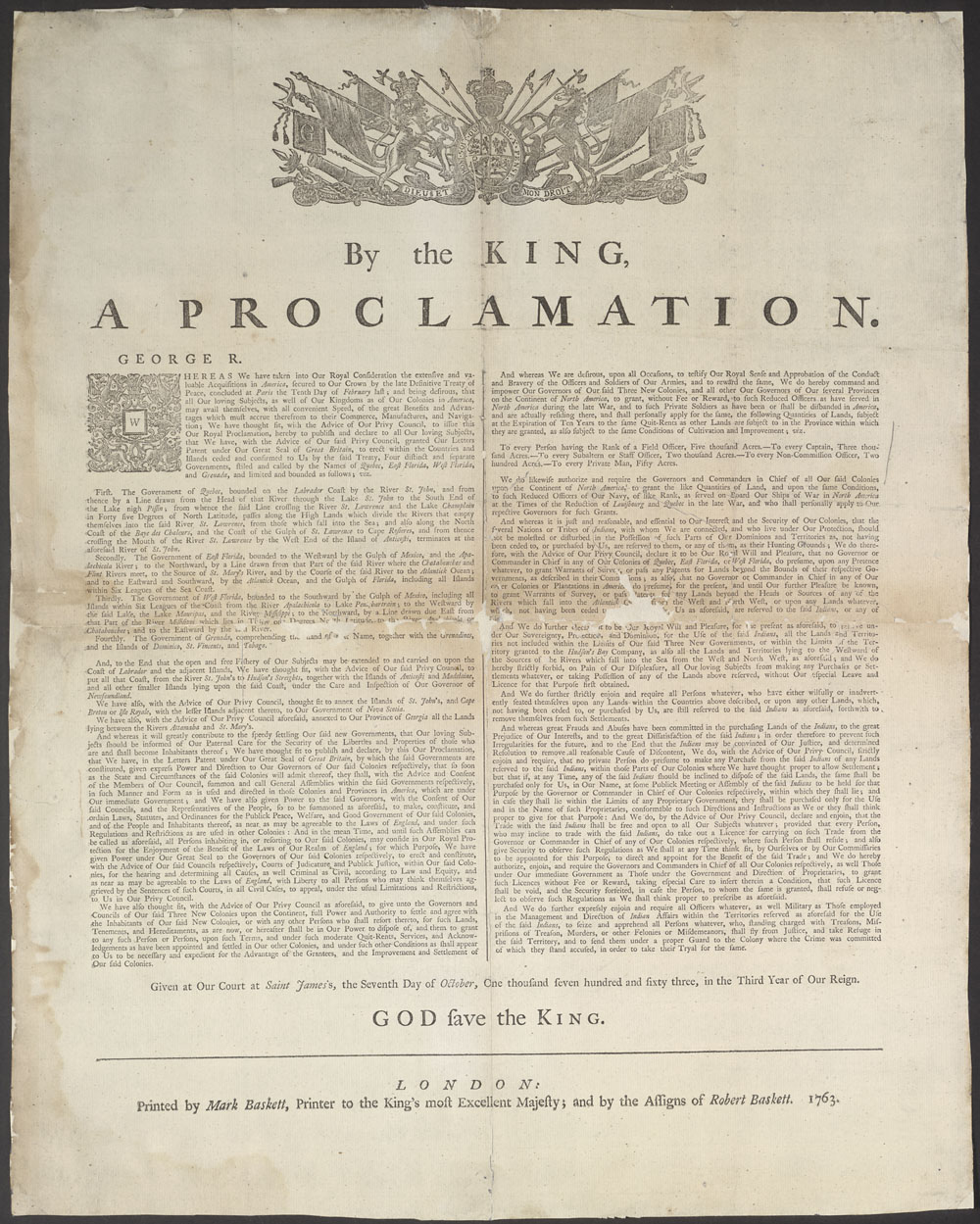
Royal Proclamation of 1763

The Royal Proclamation of 1763, issued by King George III, is considered one of the most important treaties in Canada between Europeans and Indigenous peoples, establishing the relationship between Indigenous peoples and the Crown, which recognized Indigenous peoples rights, as well as defining the treaty making process, which is still used in Canada today. The Royal Proclamation also acknowledged Indigenous peoples' constitutional right to sovereignty and self government. Within the document, both sides agreed that treaties were the most effective legal way for Indigenous peoples to release control of their land. However, the Royal Proclamation was drafted by the British government, without any Indigenous input, which resulted in a monopoly over the purchase of Indigenous lands by the Crown. The Proclamation banned non-Indigenous settlers from claiming the land that was being populated by Indigenous peoples, unless the land had first been purchased by the Crown and then sold to the settlers. As time passed, non-Indigenous settlers became eager to establish their own communities and extract resources to sell, forgoing the guidelines set out in the Proclamation.

On appeal of St Catharines Milling and Lumber Co v R in 1888, the imperial Privy Council found native land rights were derived from the Royal Proclamation of 1763. In 1973, Calder v British Columbia (Attorney General), the Supreme Court of Canada found that the Indigenous peoples of Canada held an aboriginal title to their land, which was independent of the Royal Proclamation of 1763 and was derived from the fact that, "when the settlers came, the Indians were there, organized in societies and occupying the land as their forefathers had done for centuries".

=== Gradual Civilization Act of 1857 ===
Assimilation was the goal for the Europeans for Indigenous individuals for much of history, this can be seen in the Gradual Civilization Act. This act was made in 1857 by CAct played on the idea of how Indigenous individuals were 'savages' that needed to be reformed by the 'civilized' Europeans, thus the act being called the Gradual Civilization Act. In some ways the Gradual Civilization Act was an extension of residential schools because it had the same goal but this Act was targeted towards Indigenous men instead of children. This Act made it so that Indigenous men, if they wanted to could become a part of the European-Canadian society, they were to give up many different aspects of their culture. The European-Canadian definition of being civilized entailed being able to speak and write in either English or French, and to be as similar to a white man as possible so that there were no discernible differences. There were commissioners that were tasked to make sure that these criteria were filled, and they examined Indigenous individuals to make sure that they were meeting the criteria. The outcome of this was that any individual that was deemed to meet the criteria could become enfranchised. The Act was a direct consequence of settler colonialism as the Indigenous individuals were forced to assimilate to the world views and customs of the settlers.

=== Numbered treaties ===
The Numbered Treaties (or Post-Confederation Treaties) are a series of eleven treaties signed between the First Nations, one of three groups of Indigenous peoples in Canada, and the reigning monarch of Canada (Victoria, Edward VII or George V) from 1871 to 1921. These agreements were created to allow the Government of Canada to pursue settlement and resource extraction in the affected regions, which includes the entirety of modern-day Alberta, Manitoba, and Saskatchewan, as well as parts of modern-day British Columbia, Ontario, the Northwest Territories, Nunavut, and Yukon. These treaties acquired large tracts of land for settlers in exchange for promises made to the indigenous people of the area. These terms were dependent on individual negotiations and so specific terms differed with each treaty. The expansion of settler lands resulted in a large-scale displacement of Indigenous populations.

These treaties came in two waves—Numbers 1 through 7 from 1871 to 1877 and Numbers 8 through 11 from 1899 to 1921. In the first wave, the treaties were key in advancing European settlement across the Prairie regions as well as the development of the Canadian Pacific Railway. In the second wave, resource extraction was the main motive for government officials. During this time, Canada introduced the Indian Act extending its control over the First Nations to education, government and legal rights. The federal government did provide emergency relief, on condition of the Indigenous peoples moving to the Indian reserves.

Today, these agreements are upheld by the Government of Canada, administered by Canadian Aboriginal law and overseen by the Minister of Crown–Indigenous Relations. They are often criticized and are a leading issue within the fight for First Nation rights. The Constitution Act, 1982 gave protection of First Nations and treaty rights under Section 35. It states: "Aboriginal and treaty rights are hereby recognized and affirmed." This phrase was never fully defined. As a result, First Nations must attest their rights in court as the case in R v Sparrow.

=== The Indian Act of 1876 ===
In 1876, the Indian Act was passed by the Parliament of Canada and allowed the administration of Indian Status, reserve lands, and local Indigenous governance. The act gave the Canadian government control over Indigenous identity, political practices, governance, cultural practices, and education. One of the underlying motivations in the act was to enforce a policy of assimilation, to prohibit Indigenous peoples from practicing their own cultural, political, and spiritual beliefs. The act defined Indian Status and the entitlement and legal conditions that accompanied it, established land management regimes on reserves, managed the sales of natural resources, and defined band council powers and electoral systems.

Gender discrimination within the act enforced gender bias as another means of extinguishing Indian Status, thereby excluding women from their rights. Under this legislation, an Indian woman who married a non-Indian man would no longer be Indian. She would lose her status, treaty benefits, health benefits, the right to live on reserve, the right to inherit property, and even the right to be buried with ancestors. However, when an Indian man married a woman without status, he retained all his rights.

In 1951, the act was amended, to lift the various restrictions on Indigenous culture, religion, and politics. This included removing bans on potlatch and sun dance ceremonies. Additionally, these amendments allowed women to vote in band council elections and Elsie Marie Knott was the first woman to be elected chief in Canada. However, these actions didn't eliminate gender disparity in status requirements. Instead of having "Indian blood", status was assigned through the Indian Register, where male lines of descent were still privileged. In 1985, the act was amended again, through Bill C-31, in order to reflect the newly enacted Canadian Charter of Rights and Freedoms. The amendment allowed women who "married out" of their band to apply for their rights and Indian status to be restored.

=== Residential schools ===
The Canadian Indian residential school system was an extensive school system that was set up by the Government of Canada and organized and ran by Churches. While the first residential schools for Indigenous children were formed in the 17th Century, the system set up by Canada began in the 1880s and began to close during the end of the 20th century. One of the first schools, the Mohawk School in Six Nations, was seen as a model, teaching skills in agriculture and trades, seen as a necessity in the changing world. By the 1880s, the concept and goals of residential schools changed following the Bagot Report and the Gradual Civilization Act. Residential schools were seen as a tool to eradicate Indigenous culture and traditions, instill Euro-Canadian values, and impose the Christian religion for assimilation into Canadian society.

External videos
- "Residential Schools in Canada: A Timeline" (2020) – Historica Canada (3:59min)

As settlers began to populate Canada, they brought their own Euro-centric views that believed that their civilization was the ultimate goal. Settlers saw Indigenous people as savage pagans that needed to be civilized, with the best means of doing so was through government mandated education. Residential schools did not as much result in the education of Indigenous peoples, as much as it did result in a 'cultural genocide' of Indigenous peoples. The establishment of residential schools is a direct link to colonial settlers and the values that they brought, when they began to populate what we know today as Canada.

In Canada over 150,000 children attended residential schools throughout the century that they were in operation. The Indigenous children that attended residential schools were often forcibly removed from their homes and families as residential schools became mandatory. While at residential schools, students were no longer allowed to speak their own language or acknowledge their culture or heritage without the threat of punishment. Conditions at many schools were unhealthy and there was a high rate of tuberculosis. Discipline was harsh. If rules were broken the students were brutally punished. Further, there was extensive abuse. Residential schools were known for students experiencing physical, sexual, emotional and psychological abuse from the staff of the schools. Residential schools resulted in generations of Indigenous peoples who lost their language and culture. The removal from homes at such a young age also resulted in generations that did not have the knowledge or skills to have families of their own.

== Ongoing effects of colonialism in Canada ==
=== Colonialism in current times ===
Colonialism is defined by its practice of domination which includes the subjugation of one people, the colonizers over another, the colonized. The distinction of settler colonialism is its goal of replacing the people already living there. Through colonization Canada's Indigenous people have been subject to the destruction against their culture and traditions through assimilation and force. It can be argued that Colonialism and its effects are still ongoing when looking at current events.

=== Forced sterilization of Indigenous people ===
Forced sterilization is defined as the removal of a person's reproductive organs either through force or coercion, and is viewed as a human rights violation. Its effect against Indigenous women has also identified it as violence against women and a form of racial discrimination. Canada has had a history of sterilization which has disproportionately affected Indigenous women in the North. This has led to proposals on how healthcare can be better tailored to address the discrimination Indigenous women face when receiving healthcare.

Indigenous women have reported to having found out that their fallopian tubes had been tied without their consent or were coerced into agreeing to it by doctors who assured them it was reversible. The interference in Indigenous peoples reproductive lives were justified using the ideology of Eugenics. Although the Sexual Sterilization Act in Canada was repealed in 1972, the sterilizations of Indigenous people have continued. While the policies of coercive sterilization on Indigenous women have been recognized as sexist, racist and imperialist the extent to which it has systematically impacted Indigenous women is not an isolated instance of abuse. It can be looked at as a part of a larger context involving the colonization and racism Indigenous people face.

=== Missing and murdered Indigenous women and girls ===
Missing and murdered Indigenous women and girls (MMIWG) is an ongoing issue that gained awareness through the efforts of the 2015 Truth and Reconciliation Commission of Canada (TRC) when it called for a national inquiry on missing and murdered Indigenous women and girls in Canada. A 2014 report by the Royal Canadian Mounted Police, suggests that between 1980 and 2012 1,017 Indigenous women were victims of homicide with 164 Indigenous women still considered missing. Statistics show that Indigenous women of at least 15 years of age are three times more likely than non-Indigenous women to be victims of a violent crime. The homicide rates of Indigenous women between 1997 and 2000 were seven times higher than non-Indigenous women.

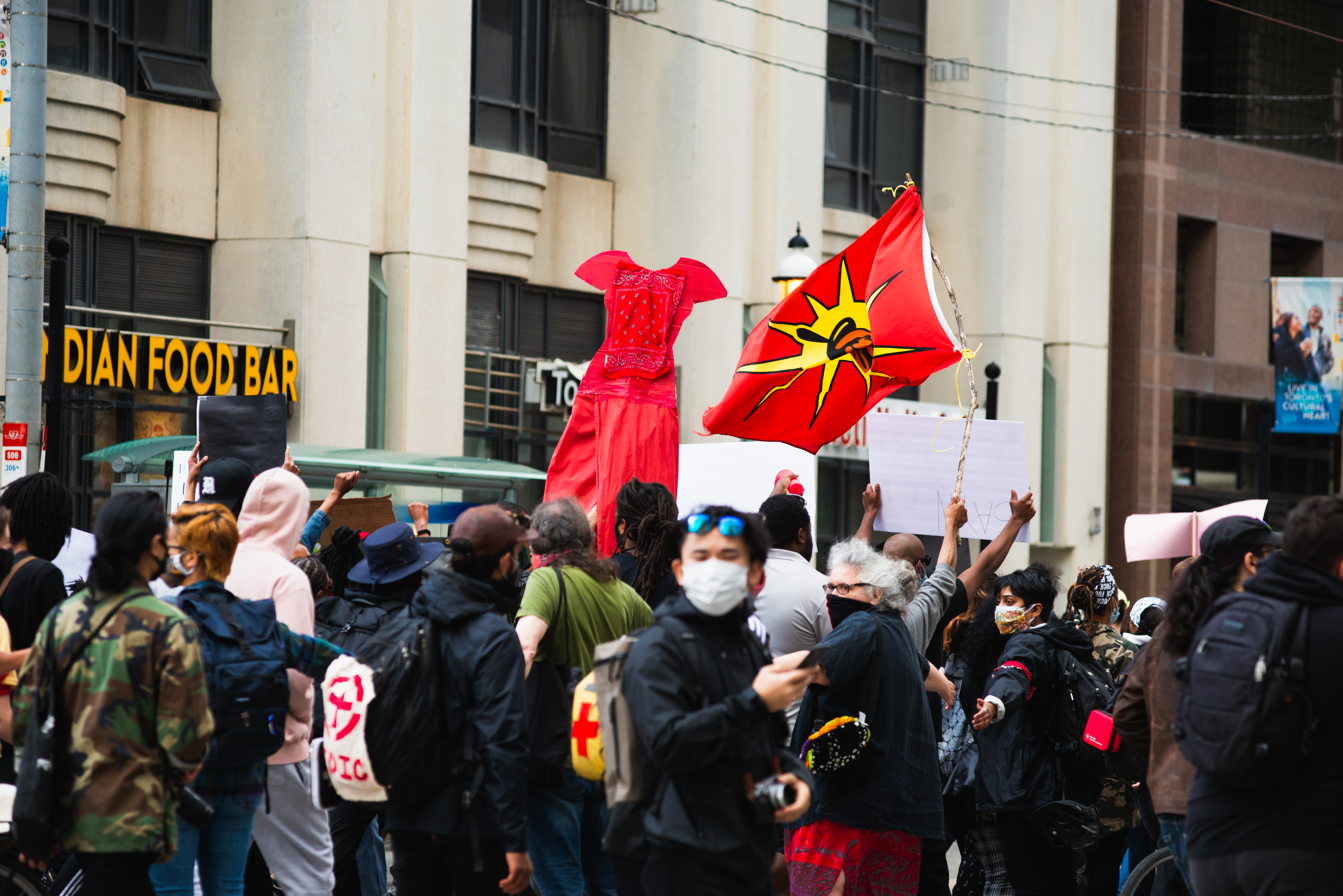
Red dress representing missing and murdered Indigenous women and Mohawk warrior flag held at Toronto march

Janice Accose's book, Iskwewak--kah' ki yaw ni wahkomakanak, draws a connection between racist and sexist depictions of Indigenous women in popular literature and violence against Indigenous women, which Accose claims led to the issue of MMIWG. Notable to MMIWG is the Highway of Tears, a 725-kilometre stretch of highway 16 in British Columbia, that has been the location of many murders and disappearances beginning in 1970, disproportionately of which have been Indigenous women.

=== Mass incarceration ===
Mass incarceration is an ongoing issue between Indigenous peoples and Canada's legal system in which Indigenous people are overrepresented within the Canadian prison population. Mass incarceration of Indigenous peoples results from a variety of problems stemming from settler colonialism that Indigenous peoples face daily including, poverty, substance abuse, lack of education and lack of employment opportunities. In 1999, the Supreme Court of Canada decided in R v Gladue that courts must consider the "circumstances of Aboriginal offenders." This decision lead to the creation of Gladue reports which allow Indigenous people to go through pre-sentencing and bail hearings that consider the way colonialism has harmed the Indigenous offender including considering cultural oppression, abuse suffered in residential schools and poverty. Thirteen years after the Gladue decision, the Supreme Court of Canada reaffirmed the decision in R v Ipeelee extending the decision to require courts to consider the impact of colonialism on every Indigenous person being sentenced. These decisions were made to address the overrepresentation of Indigenous peoples in the prison population, however, the population has only been steadily increasing. Indigenous peoples in Canada only make up about 5% of the total population yet, in 2020 Indigenous people surpassed 30% of people behind bars. Further, in 2020 Indigenous women accounted for 42% of the female inmate population in Canada. Compared to non-Indigenous people, Indigenous peoples are less likely to be released on parole, are disproportionately placed in maximum security facilities, are more likely to be involved in use of force or self-injury incidents, and are more often placed in segregation.

=== Two-Spirit Erasure ===
Before Indigenous colonization occurred in Canada, Two-Spirit people were highly revered in Indigenous communities. Two-Spirit people had very distinct and important roles, as well as traditions, ceremonial roles, and stories. Once settlers arrived in Canada, they brought ideas about heteronormativity and traditional gender roles. Settlers used their religious agendas to push their ideas of only having two genders, and forced Two-Spirit people to conform to the roles carried out by people of the same assigned sex at birth. Settlers forced Indigenous people to speak English, leading to the loss of traditional Indigenous terms for Two-Spirit peoples.

When settlers arrived in Canada, they coined the term “Berdache” to describe Two-Spirit people. This was a French term for younger partners in male homosexual relationships, and was extremely offensive and derogatory. This use of this term villainized Two-Spirit peoples, and erased traditional terms for Two-Spirit people.

With the opening of residential schools, children were taught that there were only two genders, as well as homosexuality being morally wrong. Children were punished heavily if they spoke of homosexuality, causing the topic to become feared. Colonialism caused many Indigenous people to adopt homophobic ideas, causing many Two-Spirit people to face discrimination and shame in their communities. By the 1840s, many Two-Spirit traditions had been driven from Indigenous communities because of colonialism.

== Genocide ==
The debate over Indigenous genocide globally is complicated and contentious. According to certain genocide scholars, including Raphael Lemkin – the individual who coined the term genocide – colonialism was intimately connected with genocide. Other genocide experts, such as Steven Katz, narrowly define genocide in the context of the Holocaust, arguing it requires the complete physical eradication of a group. The overlap of law and history leads to different views on genocide. The law focuses on serious acts, limiting it to physical and biological aspects, and requiring intent to destroy a group. Historians investigate the broader complexities of genocides, including long-term processes and various motives, without strict legal definitions. The main debate centers around the definitions of genocide, as outlined in the United Nations Genocide Convention, and within the Canadian context, the Rome Statute of which is defined in Canada's Crimes Against Humanity and War Crimes Act.

The majority of Canadian historians agree that the treatment of Indigenous peoples by European settlers and subsequent Canadian governments constitutes genocide; despite, this Indigenous genocide denialism is still a component of Canadian society. Some scholars have questioned whether genocide legally applies to Canada's history, arguing that the broader term "crimes against humanity" may be more fitting and legally defining. Scholars, Including William Schabas, Ian Gentles, Robert Bothwell and Payam Akhavan, suggest that the legal challenges of determining genocide make it difficult to apply the term to Canada, as genocidal intent is very difficult to establish as outlined by the Genocide Convention. Scholars like David MacDonald and Graham Hudson argue that Article 2 (e) would include residential schools in the Genocide Convention as currently worded. Other scholars, namely Pamela Palmater and James Daschuk, have used the term ethnic cleansing to describe the displacement and removal of Indigenous peoples from the Canadian prairies.

== Indigenous resistance ==
Historically, Indigenous resistance in Canada has taken the form of protests, blockades, legal challenges, and cultural revitalization efforts, all aimed at challenging the policies and practices of the Canadian government and asserting Indigenous sovereignty over their traditional territories.

=== Indigenous mobilization against the 1969 White Paper ===
In 1969, Prime Minister Pierre Trudeau and Minister of Indian Affairs Jean Chrétien proposed the White Paper, which recommended abolishing the Indian Act to extend full citizenship to Indigenous peoples after the Hawthorn report concluded Indigenous peoples were "citizens minus." If entered into force, Indigenous peoples would become an ethnic group 'equal' to others in Canada, therefore rendering Aboriginal title and rights 'unequal.' This policy espoused a liberal definition of equality in which legislated differences between Indigenous peoples and Canadians created inequities, rather than attributing inequities to the ongoing violence of settler colonialism. The White Paper indicated how colonial understandings of treaties as contracts differed from Indigenous understandings of covenants, as it would eliminate federal fiduciary responsibilities established by treaties and the Indian Act. Indigenous mobilization against the White Paper culminated in Harold Cardinal's Red Paper (also known as "Citizens Plus"). While the White Paper was not enacted, it was preceded and succeeded by further assimilation strategies.

Tk'emlupsemc, French-Canadian, and Ukrainian historian Sarah Nickel argued scholars marking the White Paper as a turning point in pan-Indigenous political mobilization obfuscates both local responses and longer histories of Indigenous struggles by unfairly centering one settler policy. Further, Indigenous women's organizations were marginalized despite claims of pan-Indigenous mobilization against the White Paper. This diminished the continuous presence of Indigenous women undertaking political struggles, especially on intersectional issues of Indigeneity and gender, such as marrying-out policies.

=== Walking with Our Sisters ===
Another ongoing movement in direct relation to MMIWG is Walking with Our Sisters. It is a commemorative art installation using vamps, the tops of moccasins, as a way to represent the unfinished lives of the Indigenous women who are murdered or missing.

One such art installation is Every One by Cannupa Hanska Luger, an enrolled member of the Three Affiliated Tribes of the Fort Berthold Reservation who is of Mandan, Hidatsa, Arikara, Lakota, Austrian, and Norwegian heritage. This art installation, which was on display at the Gardiner Museum in Toronto, is a massive piece made from ceramic beads that make up the face of an Indigenous woman. The goal of the installation is to raise awareness of missing and murdered Indigenous women and to humanize Indigenous people.

=== Wet'suwet'en resistance to pipeline projects ===
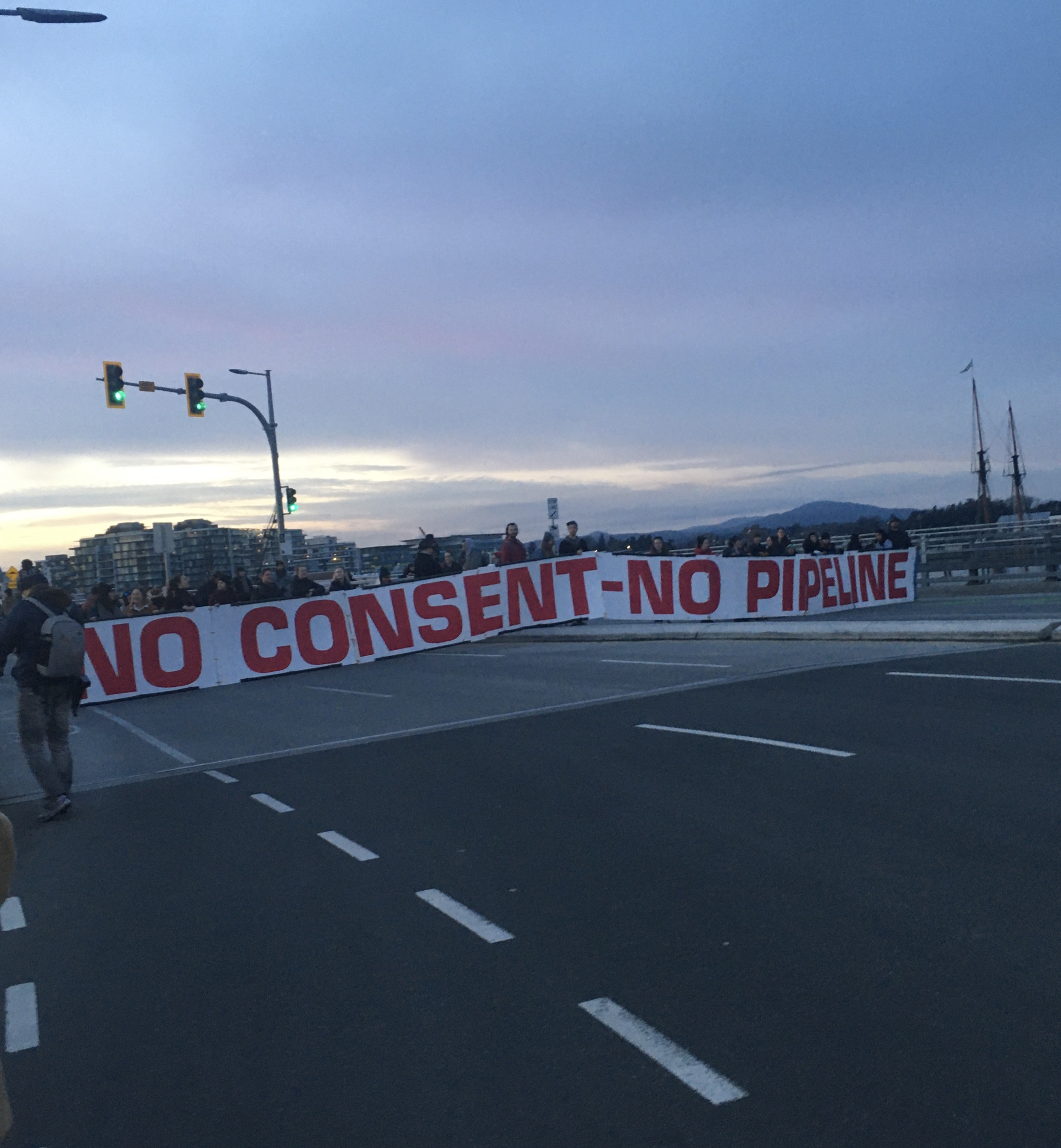
"No Consent - No Pipeline" Banner seen in Victoria, during Wet'suwet'en solidarity actions in February 2020

The Wetʼsuwetʼen First Nation, located in the northeast of British Columbia's central, interior region, has long been engaged in an ongoing dispute with the Canadian state over its rights and land. In the 1997 case, Delgamuukw v British Columbia, which expanded on the earlier Calder v British Columbia (AG) and helped codify the ideas that Aboriginal title existed prior to, and could exist outside of, Canadian sovereignty, the court determined that infringements against Aboriginal title by the Canadian state were possible. While several Indigenous groups negotiated terms of treaty with the Canadian Crown, the Wet’suwet’en reaffirmed their right to sovereignty and, in 2008, removed themselves from the treaty process with British Columbia altogether.

== See also ==
- Acculturation
- Anabaptist settler colonialism
- Cultural assimilation of Native Americans
- Residential school denialism
- Language shift
- Indigenous Peoples and the Canadian Criminal Justice System

== Sources ==
- Dhamoon, Rita Kaur (2016). "Re-presenting Genocide: The Canadian Museum of Human Rights and Settler Colonial Power". The Journal of Race, Ethnicity, and Politics. 1 (1): 5–30. doi:10.1017/rep.2015.4.
- MacDonald, David B.; Hudson, Graham (2012). "The Genocide Question and Indian Residential Schools in Canada". Canadian Journal of Political Science. 45 (2): 427–449. doi:10.1017/s000842391200039x.
- MacDonald, David B. (2 October 2015). "Canada's history wars: indigenous genocide and public memory in the United States, Australia and Canada". Journal of Genocide Research. 17 (4): 411–431. doi:10.1080/14623528.2015.1096583.
- Rubinstein, W. D. (2004). "Genocide and Historical Debate: William D. Rubinstein Ascribes the Bitterness of Historians' Arguments to the Lack of an Agreed Definition and to Political Agendas". History Today. 54. Archived from the original on 5 February 2009 – via Questia.
