= Conditional sentence (Canada) =

Non-custodial criminal punishment

A conditional sentence is a non-custodial punishment for crime. It is one type of criminal sentencing used in Canada.

== Description ==
Conditional refers to rules the offender must follow in order to remain out of prison, which are similar to when one is on parole.

These are most often treatment for drug or alcohol abuse, curfews, and community service. Offenders who breach their conditions or re-offend may complete their sentence in prison.

To receive a conditional sentence, the sentencing judge must be satisfied that the offender does not pose a danger to the community. This allows less serious offenders to remain in their communities or at home. The largest percentage of conditional sentences are for property crime. By law, a conditional sentence must be less than two years in duration; they have an average length of eight months., and the offence that the offender was convicted of cannot be punishable by a minimum sentence of imprisonment.

Conditional sentences were introduced in 1995 as a response to perceived over-incarceration, especially among Indigenous peoples in Canada.

== Administration ==
Conditional sentences are administered by provincial probation and parole services. The accused must be supervised by a probation officer and regularly attend meetings.

=== Breach of a conditional sentence ===
An accused person may be arrested without warrant where a peace officer believes on reasonable grounds that the accused has failed to comply with a condition or by warrant. An accused arrested for an alleged breach will be detained in custody pending a hearing to determine whether a breach occurred. The accused may apply for bail pending the hearing. However, under subsection 515(6) the accused bears the onus. Upon the earliest of the accused being arrested for an alleged breach or upon the issuance of a warrant, the conditional sentence stops running. At a breach hearing the Crown bears the onus to prove a breach on a balance of probabilities. If the court finds that a breach occurred, the accused bears to onus to justify the continuation of the conditional sentence. The court may do one of four things: take no action, order that the accused serve a portion of the conditional sentence in custody, terminate the conditional sentence and order that the accused serve the remainder of the conditional sentence in custody or change a condition of the order.

=== Remission ===
A conditional sentence is a custodial sentence. However, the accused is ineligible for remission. Typically accused persons sentenced to custody are given a one-day reduction for every two days served, provided the accused is of good behaviour and follows the institutional rules (see sec. 6 of the Prisons and Reformatories Act). This results in the vast majority of accused persons serving two thirds of their sentence. Therefore, where the conditions of the conditional sentence resemble incarceration (e.g. a conditional requiring the accused person to reside in a secure psychiatric hospital), the conditional sentence may actually be more harsh than a carceral sentence (i.e. a two year conditional sentence which is effectively served in an institution is equivalent to a three year prison sentence since a person sentenced to three years would be eligible for mandatory release after two thirds of the sentence).

== Controversy ==
Conditional sentences are controversial among some Canadians as being too lenient. For example, Mothers Against Drunk Driving have argued that they should not be available to persons convicted of impaired driving.

Former justice minister Vic Toews, then justice critic for the Conservative Party of Canada, has also criticized them, saying that Canada needs to "get the drug men and the gunmen off the streets and get rid of conditional sentences." In 2008, Stephen Harper noted that in Saskatchewan 39 per cent of criminals sentenced to house arrest were sent back to jail for breaching their conditions. In addition, thousands convicted of crimes of violence, including homicides and sexual assaults have been given conditional sentences.

Proponents of conditional sentences, however, have noted that the courts must not give a conditional sentence if it believes the offender will endanger the community. Furthermore, only a minority of offenders breach their conditions or reoffend, and that conditional sentencing saves taxpayers over $50,000 per inmate each year.

== See also ==
- Criminal sentencing in Canada
- Suspended sentence
