= Gladue report =

Canadian pre-sentencing report for Aboriginal peoples

A Gladue report is a type of pre-sentencing and bail hearing report that a Canadian court can request when considering sentencing an offender of Indigenous background under Section 718.2(e) of the Criminal Code.

The process derives its name from R. v. Gladue, a 1999 Supreme Court of Canada decision that was the first to challenge Section 718.2(e) of the Criminal Code.

== Background ==
Jamie Tanis Gladue was a young Cree woman charged with second-degree murder after stabbing her common-law husband during an altercation. On the evening of her nineteenth birthday celebration, Gladue confronted the victim, Reuben Beaver, about the affair she believed he was having with her sister. Her suspicions appeared correct, and he insulted her. A few minutes later, Beaver fled the home, and Gladue ran at him with a large knife and stabbed him in the chest.

At the trial, Gladue pleaded guilty to manslaughter as her blood alcohol content at the time of the incident was between 155 and 165 milligrams of alcohol in 100 millilitres of blood. Gladue's criminal record only consisted of an impaired driving conviction. Regarding her sentencing, the Supreme Court noted: "...a sentence of three years’ imprisonment was not unreasonable. More importantly, the accused was granted, subject to certain conditions, day parole after she had served six months in a correctional centre and, about a year ago, was granted full parole with the same conditions. The results of the sentence with incarceration for six months and the subsequent controlled release were in the interests of both the accused and society."

Gladue was the first case to challenge section 718.2(e) before the courts. The accused's Aboriginal background did not affect sentencing. The trial judge noted that both Gladue and the victim were not living in an Aboriginal community at the time of the incident and therefore had no special circumstances arising from their Métis status. While Gladue was a Métis woman, she was living in an urban area at the time which affected the decision of the trial judge in applying section 718.2(e). Section 718.2(e) is often referred to as the "Aboriginal sentencing section."

== Gladue Principle ==
During the 1970s, Government of Canada reported that Indigenous overrepresentation in the justice system was becoming more concerning due to the rapid increase of Indigenous offenders. In 1996, the Canadian Parliament introduced an amendment to the Criminal Code of Canada, section 718.2(e), in Bill C-41, to help reduce the rate of Indigenous people entering the justice system.

Section 718.2(e) of the criminal code is defined within the “Other sentencing principles”. The section is outlined as follows: “A court that imposes a sentence shall also take into consideration the following principles: (e) all available sanctions, other than imprisonment, that are reasonable in the circumstances and consistent with the harm done to victims or the community should be considered for all offenders, with particular attention to the circumstances of Aboriginal offenders”.

This sentencing principle enforces deliberation for Canadian Judges; considering other sentencing options, rather than imprisonment – based upon factors of specific life, social and cultural circumstances of Indigenous offenders.

Subsection 718.2(e) is a guiding principle and not a substantive power. Therefore, the court is not at liberty to impose a sentence outside the range of legally available penalties. For example, if there is a minimum sentence of imprisonment, the court cannot use the Gladue Principle to impose a sentence lower than the minimum. However, courts have considered the Gladue Principle in determining the constitutionality of minimum sentences which are set by the Crown, depending on whether the Crown elects to serve a notice of enhanced penalty under s. 729 or elects to proceed by indictment.

In March 2012, the Supreme Court of Canada ruled that the Gladue Principle also applies to breaches of long-term supervision orders. They stated that "failing to take aboriginal circumstances into account would violate the fundamental principle of sentencing". This ruling, R v Ipeelee, 2012 SCC 13, [2012] 1 SCR 433, also reinforced the principles underlying the Gladue Report generally. Ipeelee itself quickly became extremely influential in sentencing matters concerning aboriginal offenders. "Out of the cases studied in year 1, 75% of sentences meted out completely or mostly followed the recommendations of the Gladue reports; in year 2, 75% completely or mostly followed recommendations in the report; and in year 3, 80% of reported sentences closely followed or were in line with the recommendations in the Gladue reports."

== Gladue principles within the justice system ==
=== Application ===
Gladue principles must be applied to anyone who identifies as Indigenous, including Status and non-Status Indians, as well as those who identify as First Nations, Métis and Inuit - when they are charged with a crime or going through the justice system. Gladue principles can be applied during sentencing, bail, parole, and numerous situations within the courts.

In 2026, a Supreme Court of the Northwest Territories judge ruled that Gladue principles could be applied to defendants regardless of their self-identity. A defendant had identified as "Caucasian", however the judge made a determination that the defendant was actually Indigenous and had taken up an "erroneous position as to his heritage", which required a Gladue report.

=== Collection of information ===
Gladue's report outlines individual and systematic background information for the judge. While this can vary depending on the province, territory, or court system, the Canadian Bar Association (CBA) outlines a general overview of questions. The report would start with the client's background – from general information, such as age, marital status, if they have dependent children – to more specific information like their occupation, and how long they have been working.

Additional questions will then be asked regarding to the client's family – their parent's background, the client's relationship with them, if anyone in their family, including them, attended residential schools. Questions related to their grandparents, siblings, extended family, and members of their community, that support the client.

The questioning continues, bringing up factors which might have led them to their involvement within the justice system, such as social and cultural factors, substance abuse and mental health. Once completed, the report is submitted to the judge to be considered.

Overall, the purpose of the questions is to bring up background information, not just of the client, but their families too. The background information helps inform the judge and supports their understanding of the multiple factors that lead an Indigenous person in Canada to be involved in the justice system.

=== Considerations by judge ===
The court’s goal is to decide on a sentence that’s appropriate for the Indigenous offender due to the factors that lead them to the court and the victim. Judges will look at two categories of circumstances that are required to be considered when determining the correct sentence for an Indigenous person:

“A)The role of unique systemic and background factors in bringing them before the court for sentencing; and, B)Appropriate types of sentencing procedures and sanctions based on their particular Indigenous heritage or connection”.

Gladue factors include the effects of colonialism, not just for the individual but also for the family and community they are a part of. The continued effects of colonization on Indigenous people include racism, losing language, Indian Residential Schools and Indian Day Schools.

Analyzing impacts of modern colonization an Indigenous individual has faced, enables the court to consider alternatives to prison when sentencing; the objective is to address the challenges Indigenous people face opposed to non-Indigenous individuals.

Judges must be concerned about the report and the impact colonization has on Indigenous individuals; judges then must be concerned about alternatives to prison. Alternatives to prison may include community-based programming, treatment centres, and different ways of sentencing, such as sentencing circles or healing options in their community.

== Over-representation of Indigenous people in criminal justice system ==
The amendment specifically aimed to address Indigenous over-representation and stated that in order to determine an appropriate sentence, the judge must consider the background of the accused as these can often be mitigating factors. The Court found that the rate of incarceration for Indigenous offenders was extremely high, and hoped that these amendments would provide some alternatives to imprisonment. Section 718.2(e) of the Canadian Criminal code was changed to dictate that "all available sanctions other than imprisonment that are reasonable in the circumstances should be considered for all offenders, with particular attention to the circumstances of aboriginal offenders". Allan Rock, Canada’s Minister of Justice at the time, explained that the amendment "aims to encourage courts to look at alternatives [which are] consistent with the protection of the public – alternatives to jail – and not simply resort to that easy answer in every case". Under this amendment, correctional decision makers must take into account Indigenous social history in situations where their liberty is at stake. The factors include the effects of the residential school system, experience in the child welfare and adoption system, effects of dislocation and dispossession of Indigenous peoples, level or lack of formal education and poverty and poor living conditions.

=== Continued over-representation and criticism of Gladue ===
Section 718.2(e) and Gladue principles aim to combat the increasing number of Indigenous people entering the justice system in Canada. However, the criticism of Gladue involves the increasing number of Indigenous prisoners within systems.

While s. 718.2(e) was introduced in 1996, R v. Gladue was not until 1999, and R v Ipeelee happened in 2012; criticism of Gladue is, if it is functioning appropriately, the rates of incarceration for Indigenous should be stagnant or declining, not rapidly increasing. From 1991 to 1992, before s. 718.2(e) was introduced, Indigenous people entering federal prisons was 11%. From 1996 to 1997, after s. 718.2(e) was introduced, and the percentage of Indigenous people entering federal prisons was 15%.

Welsh and Ogloff's 2008 study recognized the lack of decreasing Indigenous incarceration rates when examining 691 randomly sampled sentencing decisions before and after s 718.2(e) was introduced. They noted that the Supreme Court of Canada's decision regarding s.718.2(e) as a band-aid solution was an "underestimate of the true complexity of the over-representation problem". Welsh and Ogloff's research backed up many criticisms that Gladue needed to be fixed according to the original promises made by the Supreme Court.

According to Statistics Canada, in 2020/2021, on an average day, 42.6 per 10,000 Indigenous people were in provincial custody, compared to 4.0 non-Indigenous people. The Office of the Correctional Investigator's 2021 annual report found that almost 50% of all federally incarcerated women were Indigenous.

There are many reasons why Gladue functions less than many believe it should. Perceptions that Gladue does not, nor could not, make a difference when sentencing serious offences are leading factors in the limited rates at which Gladue is being applied.

Across Canada, Gladue reports are rarely used, even in provinces and territories with a high population of Indigenous people. In Saskatchewan, between 1999 and 2014, almost half of Indigenous defendants did not have a Gladue report. Additionally, 2023 research by Rhea Murti found that most provincial appeal court judges chose not to apply Gladue when sentencing.

Further criticism of Gladue includes the idea that overincarceration is not the justice system's problem but a complex social issue. The Government of Canada has addressed the concerns regarding Gladue as "Gladue should not be regarded as a panacea for overrepresentation, but rather as a contribution to the efforts required".
