= White paper =

Preliminary document for evaluation of approach

A white paper is an informative report that explains a complex issue and presents the sponsor's philosophy on the matter. These documents are meant to help readers understand an issue, solve a problem, or make a decision.

The term originated in the early 20th century to mean a type of position paper or industry report published by a department of the UK government. Earlier forms of these reports were called "command papers".

White papers are used often in business, and sometimes in politics and academia. Since the 1990s, these documents have proliferated as sales or marketing documents in business; for more than 10 years, a majority of business-to-business (B2B) marketers report that they created a white paper within the past year. A commercial white paper is akin to a marketing presentation designed to promote a certain product to customers. As such, it can be considered content marketing or grey literature.

== White papers in business-to business marketing ==
The most prolific publishers of white papers today are business-to-business companies. These white papers are long-form content that use selected facts and logical arguments to promote the offering(s) from the company sponsoring the report. The main goal is to persuade target readers in a certain vertical market or role to agree with the sponsor's conclusions and select their offering. In most companies, white papers are created by content marketing teams or the contractors they hire, based on online research and interviews with company executives.

Corporate white papers are often used to generate sales leads, establish thought leadership, make a business case, grow email lists, grow audiences, and build the sponsor's credibility. The audiences for a B2B white paper can include prospective customers, channel partners, journalists, analysts, bloggers, investors, or any other stakeholders.

White papers are considered a form of content marketing or inbound marketing; in other words, sponsored content available on the web with or without registration, intended to raise the visibility of the sponsor to search engines and build web traffic. A B2B white paper generally argues that one particular technology, product, ideology, or methodology is superior to all others for solving a specific business problem.

There are essentially three main types of commercial white papers:

- Backgrounder: Describes the features and benefits of a certain vendor's offering; either a product, service, or methodology. This type of white paper is best used to accompany a product launch or support a technical evaluation towards the bottom of the sales funnel or the end of the customer journey. This is the least challenging type to produce, since much of the content is readily available from the sponsor.
- Numbered list: Presents a set of tips, questions, or points about a certain business issue. This type is best used to get attention with new or provocative views, or cast aspersions on competitors. Also called a listicle, this is the fastest type to create; a numbered list can often be devised from a single brainstorming session, and each item can be presented as a separate point, not part of a step-by-step logical argument.
- Problem/solution: Recommends a new, improved solution to a nagging business problem. This type is best used to generate leads at the top of the sales funnel or the start of the customer journey, to build mind share, or to inform and persuade stakeholders. This type is the most challenging to produce, since they require extensive research and persuasive writing; often these must create a compelling mental map of a market space and position several competing companies within that space. A properly done problem/solution white paper can build trust and credibility for the sponsor.

While a numbered list may be combined with either other type, it is difficult to combine a backgrounder with a problem/solution white paper. While a backgrounder looks inward at the details of one particular product or service, a problem/solution looks outward at an industry-wide problem. This is rather like the difference between looking through a microscope and looking through a telescope.

== White papers in government ==
The term white paper originated with the British government, with the Churchill White Paper of 1922 being an early example. In the British government, a white paper is usually the less extensive version of the so-called blue book, both terms being derived from the colour of the document's cover.

White papers are a "tool of participatory democracy ... not [an] unalterable policy commitment". "White papers have tried to perform the dual role of presenting firm government policies while at the same time inviting opinions upon them."

In Canada, a white paper is "a policy document, approved by Cabinet, tabled in the House of Commons and made available to the general public". The "provision of policy information through the use of white and green papers can help to create an awareness of policy issues among parliamentarians and the public and to encourage an exchange of information and analysis. They can also serve as educational techniques."

White papers are a way the government can present policy preferences before it introduces legislation. Publishing a white paper tests public opinion on controversial policy issues and helps the government gauge its probable impact.

By contrast, green papers, which are issued much more frequently, are more open-ended. Also known as consultation documents, green papers may merely propose a strategy to implement the details of other legislation, or they may set out proposals on which the government wishes to obtain public views and opinions.

Examples of governmental white papers include, in Australia, Full Employment in Australia and, in the United Kingdom, the White Paper of 1939 and the 1966 Defence White Paper. In Israeli history, the British White Paper of 1939 – marking a sharp turn against Zionism in British policy and at the time greeted with great anger by the Jewish Yishuv community in Mandatory Palestine – is remembered as "The White Paper" (in Hebrew Ha'Sefer Ha'Lavan הספר הלבן – literally "The White Book"). Similarly, in Canada the term white paper often refers specifically to the 1969 White Paper, which proposed abolishing all legal distinctions between Indigenous and non-Indigenous peoples in the country. In response, Indigenous activists laid out a counter-proposal in what they called the Red Paper.

== White papers in academia ==
White papers are also used in academic settings to present research findings to peers. Academic white papers often follow strict styles and formats, such as the Common Technical Document (CTD) standards.

Some key areas where academic white papers are published include computer science, cryptography, mathematics, medicine, physics, and IT security.

Instead of relying on the self-governance used in journalism, academic white papers rely on the feedback provided by industry leaders or experts in a field. The overall findings they provide, in the form of public peer-reviews, creates the necessary "checks-and-balances" that academics rely on to evaluate a conclusion.

Top industry journals set high publishing standards for a white paper's submission. These standards help protect a publication’s credibility and the readers from inaccuracies and false information. Recognised peer-reviewed publications must then freely publish negative and positive feedback to complete the check-and-balance.

Published white paper submissions found to be inaccurate or false can harm a publication's credibility and profitability. The result motivates publishers to be very selective. However, the same high standard is also known to censor qualified white papers, especially when a white paper supports a new perspective or revolutionary conclusion that may be initially challenged.

== Variants ==
Several variations on the colour theme exist:

- The green paper is a proposal or consultative document rather than being authoritative or final.
- The Red Book, the UK Chancellors Budget will set out the highlights and reasoning behind the governments proposed taxation and spending policies in a White Paper called The Financial Statement and Budget Report (FSBR) while an accompanying document called the Red Book will contain the detailed financial costings of the policies, estimates of revenue and forecasts for public sector borrowing.

Two others are much less well established:

- A blue paper sets out technical specifications of a technology or item of equipment.
- A yellow paper is a document containing research that has not yet been formally accepted or published in an academic journal. It is synonymous with the more widely used term preprint.

== See also ==
- Case study
- E-publishing
- Persuasive writing
- Research paper
