= Criminal law of Canada =

The criminal law of Canada is under the exclusive legislative jurisdiction of the Parliament of Canada. The power to enact criminal law is derived from section 91(27) of the Constitution Act, 1867 (Note: "The Criminal Law, except the Constitution of Courts of Criminal Jurisdiction, but including the Procedure in Criminal Matters."). Most criminal laws have been codified in the Criminal Code, as well as the Controlled Drugs and Substances Act, Youth Criminal Justice Act and several other peripheral statutes.

== Prosecution ==
A person may be prosecuted criminally for any offences found in the Criminal Code or any other federal statute containing criminal offences. In all Canadian provinces and territories, criminal prosecutions are brought in the name of the "King in Right of Canada", because the King of Canada is the country's head of state. (Note: For example, Form 4 of the Criminal Code (dealing with the heading of indictments) begins with "Her Majesty the Queen against (name of accused)".)

There are two basic types of offences. The most minor offences are summary conviction offences. They are defined as "summary" within the Act and, unless otherwise stated, are punishable by a fine of no more than $5,000 and/or six months in jail. Examples of offences which are always summary offences include trespassing at night (section 177), causing a disturbance (section 175) and taking a motor vehicle without the owner's consent (section 335) (an equivalent to the British TWOC). Summary conviction offences are tried by a judge alone in the province's provincial court.

All non-summary offences are indictable: the available penalties are greater for indictable offences than for summary offences. These in turn may be divided into three categories:

1. Very serious indictable-only offences including treason and murder (section 235) that are listed in section 469 of the Criminal Code. These can only be tried by the superior trial court of the province with a jury unless both the accused person and the Attorney General consent to trial by a superior trial court judge alone (section 473).

2. Offences of absolute jurisdiction include theft and fraud up to the value of $5,000 and certain nuisance offences. These are listed in section 553 of the Criminal Code. The accused person does not have an election and must be tried by a judge of the provincial court without a jury.

3. For all other indictable offences, the accused person can elect whether to be tried by:

- A provincial court judge
- A judge of the superior trial court of the province without a jury or
- A judge of the superior court with a jury

However, if the accused elects trial by a provincial court judge, that judge can decline jurisdiction and refer the case to the superior trial court (section 554). The Attorney General can also require a case to be tried by the superior trial court with a jury (section 568).

For most offences defined by the Criminal Code the Crown has the option to elect to proceed by summary conviction or by indictment and are sometimes known as hybrid offences. In these offences, the level of court and whether the accused has an option over their mode of trial will be determined by how the Crown elects to proceed.

== Elements of an offence ==
Criminal offences require the Crown to prove that there was criminal conduct (known as the actus reus or "guilty act") accompanied by a criminal state of mind (known as the mens rea or "guilty mind") on a standard of "beyond a reasonable doubt". Exceptions to the mens rea requirement exist for strict and absolute liability offences.

The specific elements of each offence can be found in the wording of the offence as well as the case law interpreting it. The external elements typically require there to be an "act", within some "circumstances", and sometimes a specific "consequence" that is caused by the action.

=== Mens rea ===
The mental or fault elements of an offence are typically determined by the use of words within the text of the offence or else by case law. Mens rea in Canada typically focuses on the actual or 'subjective' state of mind of the accused. Where no standard is explicitly stated conduct must typically be proven to have been done with a general intent (i.e. intent to act in a certain way irrespective of the action's outcome). Where certain circumstances are part of the offence, the accused must have had knowledge of them, which can be imputed based on conduct and other evidence.

== Defences ==
When the Crown is able to prove the elements of the offence beyond a reasonable doubt, the defence may still avoid conviction by raising a positive defence.

A true defence arises when some circumstances afford the accused a partial or complete justification or excuse for committing the criminal act. In Canada, the defences are generally similar to standard and popularly understood defences of other common law jurisdictions such as the U.K., Australia and the United States. The true defences include duress, automatism, intoxication, or necessity. There is also a partial defence of provocation, which has the effect of reducing what would otherwise be murder to manslaughter. This partial defence is provided by s. 232 of the Criminal Code.

Some defences are provided for by statute and some defences are provided for solely by the common law. In some cases common law defences are superseded by statutory enactment, for example duress, self-defence and as mentioned above, extreme intoxication. In the case of duress the Supreme Court of Canada struck down the statutory provision as violative of s. 7 of the Charter, leaving the broader common law defence instead. Statutory encroachments on the scope of common law defences can violate s. 7 of the Charter if they unacceptably reduce the fault requirement of offences.

In addition to the true defences as mentioned above, there are other "defences" in a broader sense. In some cases, these "defences" are really just an assertion that the Crown has not proven one of the elements of the offence. For example, the mistake of fact defence involves an assertion that the accused misunderstood some material factual matter that prevented him from forming the requisite mens rea for the offence. In the context of sexual assault, for example, a mistake of fact defence usually involves an assertion that the accused did not realize the complainant was not consenting. Since the mens rea for sexual assault includes a subjective appreciation of the fact that the complainant is not consenting, the "defence" of mistake of fact in this context is thus properly understood as a failure on the part of the Crown to prove its case. In practical terms and common parlance, however, it is still considered to be a defence. Another example of this more general kind of defence is the "i.d. defence", which is really just an assertion by the accused that the Crown has failed to prove the identity of the perpetrator of a crime beyond a reasonable doubt. There are many other examples of this kind of defence. In reality they are just clusters of specific shortcomings that arise frequently in the prosecution of certain kinds of offences.

All defences – whether one is speaking of true defences or defences in the broader sense – can arise from the evidence called by the Crown or the accused. A defence can only be left with the jury (or considered by a judge trying the case without a jury) where there is an "air of reality" to the defence on the evidence. That air of reality can arise from the Crown's case and/or from the defence case if one is called. It is not necessary for an accused to testify or call other evidence to raise a defence. If the evidence called by the Crown is sufficient to raise an air of reality to a defence, the jury must consider whether the defence applies, most on the standard of whether it raises a reasonable doubt. For example, in an assault case it may be that one of the Crown's eyewitnesses testifies that it looked to him like the victim punched the accused first and that the accused was defending himself. In such a case, even if all the other eyewitnesses saw the accused punch first, the jury must consider whether on all of the evidence it has a reasonable doubt that the accused acted in self-defence.

There is an even broader sense of the word "defence". Sometimes the defence will raise an issue capable of leading either to the termination of the proceedings or the exclusion of evidence. For example, in a drug case the accused might argue that the search warrant by which the police entered his house and seized the drugs was defective and that his constitutional rights were therefore violated. If he is successful in establishing such a violation, the evidence can be excluded, and usually the Crown cannot otherwise prove its case. When this sort of thing happens, it is not really a defence at all, since the accused must establish it in a separate pre-trial application. Nevertheless, lawyers often refer to such applications as a "Charter defence" in reference to the Charter of Rights.

Other forms of Charter defence can lead not to the exclusion of evidence but to the termination of the proceedings, known as a stay of proceedings. For example, if the accused is not brought to trial within a reasonable time, the proceedings must be stayed for delay by virtue of ss. 11(b) and 24(1) of the Charter. Stays of proceedings can also take place in the absence of a Charter violation. For example, the familiar "defence" of entrapment is neither a true defence nor necessarily a Charter breach. When entrapment is successfully established, the proceedings are deemed to be an "abuse of process" for which the remedy is a stay of proceedings. Cases of abuse of process arise in certain other circumstances, and they can also involve Charter breaches, and there is significant overlap.

Finally, ignorance of the law is not a defence. Section 19 of the Criminal Code specifically prohibits this defence. However, in rare cases, ignorance of a law other than the one under which the accused is charged can be a defence if knowledge of that law is a relevant circumstance required to be proved as part of the actus reus and/or mens rea.

== Legal proceedings ==
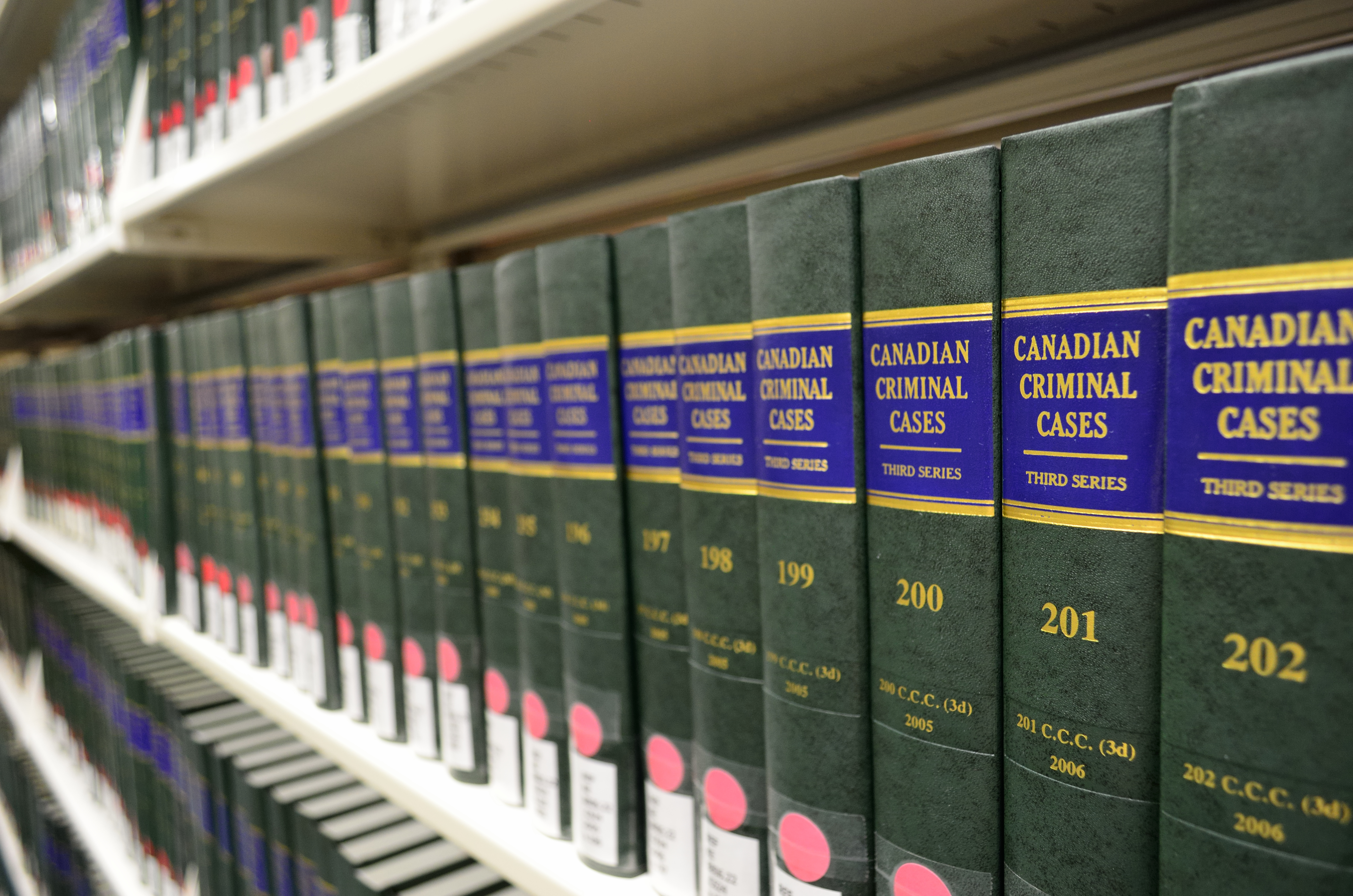
Canadian Criminal Cases collection

=== Information ===
A person who alleges an offence, generally a police officer, prepares an Information, swearing under oath the facts supporting the charge. The officer then lays the information before a Justice of the Peace, who then decides whether to issue process to summon the person named in the information, by a summons or an arrest warrant. Private individuals can also prepare an information, but private prosecutions are rare. The Attorney General of the province in which the proceedings are taking place may intervene and take over the case, or issue a stay of proceedings. Private prosecutions in Canada are usually restricted to regulatory offences such as practicing law without a licence and cruelty to animals.

=== Bail ===
Most accused persons are released at the time of arrest on a promise to appear. Where the police decide to hold the accused, the police must produce the accused before a Justice of the Peace within 24 hours. At that point a bail hearing will be held. An accused person generally does not bear the onus justifying release, subject to a few exceptions, such as if the accused is charged with murder, trafficking in narcotics, terrorism offences. An accused may be released or detained pending the trial and, if found guilty, the passing of sentence.

An order made by a Justice may be appealed to a superior court by either the Crown or the accused.

=== Preliminary inquiry ===
Where the accused is charged with an indictable offence, the Crown must prove a prima facie case before a judge of a provincial court. This process must be requested by the defence or the Crown. The presiding judge must determine whether there is sufficient evidence for a jury, acting reasonably and judicially, to convict the accused. The judge may neither weigh the evidence nor determine whether the evidence is admissible. If the judge determines there is sufficient evidence for a jury acting reasonably and judicially to convict the accused, the judge must commit the accused to stand trial. If not, the judge must discharge the accused and the proceedings end. However, if at a later date the Crown tenders further evidence, the Crown may recommence the proceedings. A discharge at a preliminary inquiry does not constitute double jeopardy.

There is no appeal from an order of a judge. However, either party may seek leave to review the order in the superior court.

If the accused is charged with an offence punishable by summary conviction or if the Crown elects to proceed by summary conviction if the accused is charged with a hybrid offence, the accused is not entitled to a preliminary inquiry and is immediately committed to trial.

Section 536(4) of the Criminal Code, proclaimed in force in 2004, indicates a preliminary inquiry is no longer automatic after an accused elects to be tried in a superior court. The Attorney General may also, in rare cases, bypass the preliminary inquiry and issue a direct indictment. This may occur even where the accused has requested a preliminary inquiry, or even when the accused has been discharged by a preliminary inquiry.

As of June 21, 2019, the coming into force of the Liberal government's Bill C-75 restricts the availability of the preliminary inquiry to offences punishable by 14 years imprisonment or more. Previously, anyone punishable by an indictable offence punishable by five or more years imprisonment would have been able to elect to have such an inquiry.

=== Trial ===
The accused is tried at this stage. Where the accused is charged with an offence and has elected to be tried in provincial court, the judge may decide that the matter ought to be dealt with in the superior court and treat the trial as a preliminary inquiry and demand the accused to stand trial in the superior court.

At this stage the trial court has all the authority to determine matters such as bail, preliminary motions, trial matters and the verdict. If the trial is by judge and jury, the jury has the ultimate authority to render a verdict but the trial judge has the authority over bail, pretrial motions and jury instructions.

=== Sentencing ===
If the accused is found guilty the trial judge must determine a fit sentence. See Criminal sentencing in Canada. Where the trial is by judge alone, the judge will determine all facts which were proven and allow the parties to adduce additional evidence concerning disputed facts which may form the basis for finding aggravating or mitigating circumstance (i.e., the extent of injuries sustained by a victim). The Crown must prove an aggravating fact beyond a reasonable doubt while the accused bears a burden on a balance of probabilities to prove a mitigating fact.

=== Appeal ===
The Crown may appeal against a verdict of acquittal on a question of law alone. The accused may appeal on a question of law, fact or mixed law and fact. Either party may appeal a sentence unless the sentence is one fixed by law.

Either party is entitled to a further appeal to the Supreme Court of Canada against a conviction or acquittal if a judge of the court of appeal dissented on a question of law or if the court of appeal allowed a Crown appeal against an acquittal and substituted a conviction. Otherwise either party may appeal a verdict or sentence with leave of the Supreme Court of Canada.

== Mental health issues ==
Mental health issues with a defendant in criminal proceedings are formally dealt with in two ways: whether the defendant is "fit to stand for trial", and the verdict of "not criminally responsible on account of mental disorder".

Informally, mental health can also be dealt with by alternative measures, through "mental health diversion". Mental health diversion will usually require a plan of supervision with the assistance of mental health social workers and professionals.

== Young offenders ==
Criminal law matters relating to young persons (those aged 12 through 17) are dealt with by the Youth Criminal Justice Act which provides for different procedures and punishments than those applicable to adults. It also provides that in some serious cases youths may be treated like adults for sentencing and other purposes.

== See also ==
- Section 91(27) of the Constitution Act, 1867
- Law enforcement in Canada
- Law of Canada
- Bail (Canada)
