= Criminal sentencing of Indigenous peoples in Canada =

Sentencing of Indigenous offenders in Canada

Criminal sentencing in Canada is governed by the Canadian Criminal Code. The Criminal Code, along with the Supreme Court of Canada, have distinguished the treatment of Indigenous individuals within the Canadian Criminal Sentencing Regime.

In sentencing, when an individual is found guilty of a criminal offence, a Canadian judge must consider the relevant provisions of the Criminal Code as well as relevant Canadian sentencing jurisprudence related to Indigenous Canadians. This distinction is a result of disproportionate sentencing of Indigenous peoples in Canada. It has resulted in specific sentencing regimes from the Supreme Court of Canada, and the Criminal Code, alongside other culturally sensitive sentencing practices.

== Background ==
Historically, a number of organizations, as well as governmental and international bodies have published reports which address the issues with the sentencing of Indigenous individuals and the issues of overincarceration. This issue of overincarceration has created the special concern in Canadian contexts for Indigenous sentencing.

=== Royal Commission on Aboriginal Peoples (1996) ===
In 1996, in its report Bridging the Cultural Divide, the Commission referred to Indigenous overrepresentation in the criminal justice system as "injustice personified." It noted that this over-representation of Indigenous peoples in Canada has been the subject of special attention in Canadian society.

=== Federal Throne Speech 2001 ===
In 2001, the federal government of Canada pledged to eliminate Aboriginal overrepresentation within a generation.

=== Truth and Reconciliation Commission: Calls to Action (2012) ===
The Truth and Reconciliation Commission, a Canadian body aimed at addressing the legacy of residential schools in Canada, and advancing Canadian reconciliation, recommended the following:

"30. We call upon federal, provincial and territorial governments to commit to eliminating the overrepresentation of Aboriginal people in custody over the next decade, and to issue detailed annual reports that monitor and evaluate progress in doing so."

"31. We call upon the federal, provincial and territorial governments to provide sufficient and stable funding to implement and evaluate community sanctions that will provide realistic alternatives to imprisonment for Aboriginal offenders and respond to underlying causes of offending."

== Indigenous overincarceration and Canadian criminal sentencing ==
Specific focus on Indigenous criminal sentencing is seen as response to the problem of Indigenous over-incarceration. The issue was first documented in 1967, in a report by the Canadian Corrections Association titled "Indians and the Law." However, the number of incarcerated Indigenous individuals has been increasing since the Second World War.

The proportion of Indigenous individuals in custody across Canada has continued to grow. In 2020, the number of proportion of indigenous individuals in federal penitentiaries reached a historic high of 30%.

In 2017/2018, Indigenous youth made up 48% of incarcerated youth individuals in Canada, while representing about 8% of the Canadian youth population.

Indigenous females represent approximately 4% of the female population in Canada, but make up 42% of the female federal inmate population.

Two prairie provinces, Manitoba and Saskatchewan, suffer from the highest rates of adult Indigenous overrepresentation. In Manitoba in 2017/2018, Indigenous adults made up 75% of admissions to custody, while representing 15% of the adult population in the province. In Saskatchewan, Indigenous adults made up 74% of admissions to custody, while representing 14% of the adult population in the province.

== s.718.2(e) of the Criminal Code ==
s.718.2(e) of the Criminal Code instructs the court to consider "all available sanctions other than imprisonment that are reasonable in the cicrumstances ... for all offenders, with particular attention to the circumstances of aboriginal offenders."

s.718.2(e) was introduced through Bill C-41 as part of the 1996 Canadian Sentencing Reforms.

== Indigenous sentencing jurisprudence ==
=== R v Gladue, [1999] 1 SCR 688 ===
R v Gladue, a decision of the Supreme Court of Canada, criticized a narrow approach taken by courts of the time with regards to s.718.2(e). As Ms. Gladue did not live on a reserve, the trial judge was of the opinion that her Indigenous heritage would not be considered under s.718.2(e). The Supreme Court corrected this approach, noting that s.718.2(e) applied to "all aboriginal persons wherever they reside, whether on- or off-reserve, in a large city or a rural area"(at paragraph 91). Generally, the court emphasized that a judge must consider the background of the specific Indigenous individual before the court, as well as recognized systemic factors when crafting a sentence. A judge is obligated to obtain information in relation to this background when crafting a sentence.

=== R v Wells, [2000] 1 SCR 207 ===
R v Wells, a decision of the Supreme Court of Canada, confirmed that s.718.2(e) of the Criminal Code is to be used to discourage imprisonment and encourage the use of restorative justice practices. However, these restorative practices are not to be preferred where an offence was serious or violent. In those instances, the focus should remain on the sentencing principles of denunciation and deterrence.

=== R v Kakekagamick, [2006] CarswellOnt 5038 ===
R v Kakekagamick, a decision of the Ontario Court of Appeal, noted that there is a "positive duty on counsel to assist the sentencing judge in gathering information as to the aboriginal offender's circumstances." In this case, the trial judge and trial counsel failed to consider the background of the Indigenous individual before the court. The Ontario Court of Appeal found that a failure to consider this information in accordance with s.718.2(e) and R v Gladue amounted to an error of law.

=== R v Ipeelee, [2012] 1 SCR 433 ===
R v Ipeelee, a decision of the Supreme Court of Canada, reaffirmed its comments in R v Gladue. In this decision, the Court reiterated a need for lower courts to take into account the oppressive environments Indigenous peoples face as Canadians. The court was critical of the lack of progress made in reducing the number of Indigenous individuals in custody, citing the continued rise of the representative population since the Gladue decision. The court was very specific in their instructions, stating at paragraph 60:

"When sentencing an Aboriginal offender, court must take judicial notice of such matter as the history of colonialism, displacement, and residential schools and how that history continues to translate into lower educational attainment, lower incomes, higher unemployment, higher rates of substance abuse and suicide and of course higher levels of incarceration for Aboriginal peoples"

Finally, the court corrected two key errors in relation to s.718.2(e). First, that the individual before the court must establish a connection between their Indigenous heritage and the offence at hand, and second, that s.718.2(e) considerations do not apply when the offence is "serious."

== Gladue Report ==
A Gladue Report, for the purposes of sentencing, may be ordered by the court to provide information related to an Individual's Indigenous heritage for the purposes of s.718.2(e). A Gladue Report is an Indigenous specific form of a Pre-Sentence Report, a report typically ordered to inform the court of the background of an individual prior to sentencing. These reports are designed to address the wider circumstances of Indigenous peoples in general, including histories of colonialism, systemic discrimination, residential schools and the sixties scoop. In addition, the reports are crafted to inform the court of the specific circumstances of the individual before the court. This includes the individual's history of addiction, trauma and victimization. It also provides an extensive background in relation to the individual history of employment, education, social circle and connections with family.

Gladue Reports are handled independently by the provinces and territories of Canada. There is no federal legislation or body regulating or monitoring the use or production of Gladue reports. Depending on the province or territory, Reports are created by independent Indigenous organizations, an arm of the provincial government, or be legal societies in the province or territory.

== Indigenous sentencing courts ==
Indigenous concepts of justice, including restorative justice, have been implemented as both supplementary and alternative forms of sentencing with the Canadian criminal justice system. Throughout Canada, a number of courts have been created that deal specifically with these forms of justice. These courts divert matters from the traditional criminal justice system within Canada. They are variously known as Indigenous courts, First Nations courts, Gladue courts, or Aboriginal courts.

=== Tsuu Ti'na Nation Court ===
First opened in 2000, this Alberta court was the first of its kind in Canada. The court represents a combination of both the Provincial Court of Alberta and the peacemaker process, a circle involving the victim, accused, their families, volunteers and resource personnel. Each sitting of the court is presided over by an Indigenous Elder from the community, who ensures that community traditions (such as smudging with sage or sweet grass) and values are upheld at each proceeding. With the consent of the victim, all criminal offences, excluding sexual offences and homicide, can be brought before the court.

=== The Gladue Court at Old City Hall ===
First opened at Old City Hall in 2001 in Toronto, Ontario, this court was a response to the decision of the Supreme Court of Canada in R v Gladue (1995). It was the first court of its kind in an urban environment in Canada. Judges, Crown and duty counsel, as well as all other actors within the Court receive Gladue-related training, and Indigenous court workers are assigned to work with each accused. Upon the entering of a guilty plea, an Indigenous individual can be diverted to the Community Council at Aboriginal Legal Services Toronto. This Community Council involves the use of a restorative sentencing circle, including Indigenous Elders, who discuss the offence in question, and set up a rehabilitative plan of care. This plan of care may include access to harm reduction, sweat lodges, support for anger management, counselling for substance abuse, housing, vocational training and work experience.

=== British Columbia courts ===
Courthouses in North Vancouver, Duncan, Kamloops and New Westminster in British Columbia offer Gladue Courts for Indigenous individuals who have pleaded guilty to criminal offences. These courts allow for victims, families, Elders, counsellors, Indigenous court workers and social workers to participate in the sentencing proceeding. Together, they devise a sentencing plan with a focus on rehabilitation. As of July 2022, British Columbia has eight Indigenous sentencing courts:

- New Westminster First Nations Court (since November 2006)
- North Vancouver Chet wa nexwníw̓ ta S7eḵw’í7tel Indigenous Court (since February 2012)
- Kamloops Cknucwentn First Nations Sentencing Court (since March 2013)
- Duncan First Nations Court (since May 2013)
- Nicola Valley Indigenous Court (since in Merritt, October 2017)
- Prince George Indigenous Court (since April 2018)
- Williams Lake Indigenous Court (since December 2020)
- Hazelton Indigenous Court (since August 2021)

=== Calgary Indigenous Court ===
Calgary Indigenous Court (CIC) was established in Calgary, Alberta, in 2019. Focused on restorative justice, and modelled after a teepee, the court sits every Wednesday morning.

=== Cree Court, Saskatchewan ===
The Cree Court in Saskatchewan conducts its proceedings in the Cree language, and "the judge may emphasize traditional Cree values regarding respect for one’s family and community in addition to the sentencing principles in the Criminal Code and/or Youth Criminal Justice Act".
