= R v Wells =

- Supreme Court of Canada

Hearing: February 23, 1991 Judgment: May 27, 2000
- Full case name: James Warren Wells v Her Majesty The Queen
- Citations: [2000] 1 S.C.R. 207
- Ruling: Appeal dismissed

Court membership
- Chief Justice: Antonio Lamer; Puisne Justices: Claire L'Heureux-Dubé, Charles Gonthier, Beverley McLachlin, Frank Iacobucci, John C. Major, Michel Bastarache, Ian Binnie, Louise Arbour

Reasons given
- Unanimous reasons by: Iacobucci J.

R v Wells is a decision of the Supreme Court of Canada with respect to sentencing principles set out in s 718.2(e) of the Criminal Code, relating to Aboriginal offenders. The decision clarified the principles set out in the Court's earlier decision in R v Gladue.

== Background ==
The offender was attending a house party where he assaulted an 18-year-old girl while she was sleeping. The offender was convicted. At the sentencing hearing he asked for a conditional sentence, citing s 718.2(e) of the Criminal Code, which directs that sentencing courts should take the circumstances of Aboriginal offenders into account when considering whether to give a non-custodial sentence. The trial judge agreed that the court must take into account the offender's Aboriginal heritage, but held that the sentence could not be served in the community since it would not provide sufficient denunciation and deterrence. The Alberta Court of Appeal upheld the sentence.

== Reasons of the Court ==
Justice Iacobucci for a unanimous court held that where the severity of the offence increases, the applicability of s. 718.2(e) decreases. For crimes of violence and where the offender is a substantial risk to the community, the offender should receive a sentence substantially similar to non-Aboriginal offenders.

== See also ==
- List of Supreme Court of Canada cases (Lamer Court)
