= R v Gladue =

1995 Supreme Court of Canada case on sentences for Indigenous offenders

- Supreme Court of Canada

Hearing: April 23, 1999 Judgment: December 19, 1999
- Full case name: Jamie Tanis Gladue v Her Majesty the Queen
- Citations: [1999] 1 SCR 688
- Ruling: Appeal dismissed

Court membership
- Chief Justice: Antonio Lamer; Puisne Justices: Claire L'Heureux-Dubé, Charles Gonthier, Peter Cory, Beverley McLachlin, Frank Iacobucci, John C. Major, Michel Bastarache, Ian Binnie

Reasons given
- Unanimous reasons by: Cory and Iacobucci JJ
- McLachlin and Major JJ took no part in the consideration or decision of the case.

Laws applied
- Criminal Code, s. 718.2(e)

R v Gladue is a decision of the Supreme Court of Canada concerning the sentencing principles outlined in s. 718.2(e) of the Criminal Code. This provision, enacted by Parliament in 1995, directs courts to consider "all available sanctions, other than imprisonment" for all offenders and to pay "particular attention to the circumstances of Aboriginal offenders".

Gladue was the first case where the Supreme Court considered the interpretation and application of this provision. It upheld the three-year sentence for manslaughter given to Gladue by the sentencing judge, but also set out factors that sentencing courts should take into account when applying s. 718.2(e).

Since the decision, sentencing judges have directed that pre-sentencing reports be prepared to assist in sentencing Indigenous offenders. These reports assess the factors the Supreme Court identified as relevant under s. 718.2(1)(e) and have become known as "Gladue reports."

In 2012, in R v Ipeelee, the Supreme Court affirmed the basic principles established in R v Gladue.

== 1995 Amendments to the Criminal Code ==
In 1995, the federal government introduced significant changes to the sentencing provisions of the Criminal Code. As part of these reforms, amendments were included to address the over-representation of Indigenous peoples in Canada's correctional systems. At that time, Indigenous peoples constituted approximately 18% of incarcerated individuals while making up only 3% of the total Canadian population, representing an over-representation more than five times their population share.

The amendments included a new provision setting out general sentencing principles. The relevant provision was the new s. 718.2(1)(e):

Other sentencing principles

718.2 A court that imposes a sentence shall also take into consideration the following principles:

...
(e) all available sanctions, other than imprisonment, that are reasonable in the circumstances and consistent with the harm done to victims or to the community should be considered for all offenders, with particular attention to the circumstances of Aboriginal offenders.

== Facts of the case ==
On September 16, 1995, Jamie Tanis Gladue, a young Indigenous woman, was celebrating her birthday with friends in Nanaimo, British Columbia. Suspecting her boyfriend was having an affair with her older sister, she confronted him. Following the confrontation, her boyfriend repeatedly insulted Gladue, who then stabbed him in the chest, causing his death. At the time of the stabbing, Gladue had a blood alcohol level between 155 and 165 milligrams per 100 millilitres of blood.

== Lower court decisions ==
Gladue was initially charged with second-degree murder but pleaded guilty to manslaughter, with the Crown prosecutor's consent, based on evidence of provocation. The primary issue was the appropriate sentence. She was sentenced to three years imprisonment.

At Gladue's sentencing hearing, the judge considered both aggravating and mitigating factors, including the absence of any serious criminal history. However, the sentencing judge did not consider any factors specifically related to Gladue's Indigenous background. The sentencing judge also held that s. 718.2(e) did not apply to Indigenous people who were off-reserve. The British Columbia Court of Appeal disagreed with the sentencing judge on this point but, by a 2-1 judgment, upheld the sentence. Both the sentencing judge and the Court of Appeal majority reasoned that the offence was serious and a three-year sentence was appropriate regardless of Indigenous background.

== Reasons of the Supreme Court ==
The Supreme Court upheld the three-year sentence but reviewed the factors that should be considered under the new sentencing provision, s. 718.2(e). Justices Cory and Iacobucci concluded that the lower courts erred by adopting an overly narrow interpretation of s. 718.2(e). They stated that the purpose of this provision is to address the historical and ongoing issue of severe over-representation of Indigenous people within the criminal justice system.

The Supreme Court found that the sentencing court erred in holding that s. 718.2(e) did not apply because Gladue was not on reserve land at the time of the offence. The Court clarified that s. 718.2(e) applies to "all aboriginal persons wherever they reside, whether on- or off-reserve, in a large city or a rural area".

== Gladue reports ==
Following the Supreme Court's decision, sentencing courts began requiring pre-sentencing reports for Indigenous offenders. These reports specifically detail the factors required by s. 718.2(e), which Parliament had enacted to help reduce the severe over-representation of Indigenous people in the Canadian criminal justice system. These reports became known as Gladue reports. Some elements included in Gladue reports are the history of colonialism, cultural oppression, poverty, abuse suffered, and residential school attendance experienced by the Indigenous offender.

== See also ==
- Gladue court
- Gladue report
- Healing lodge
- Indigenous Peoples and the Canadian Criminal Justice System
- List of Supreme Court of Canada cases (Lamer Court)
- R v Ipeelee
- R v Wells
