= Indigenous peoples and the Canadian criminal justice system =

Indigenous peoples in Canada are significantly overrepresented in the prisons of the Canadian justice system. They make up approximately 30 per cent of all incarcerated people in Canada despite being approximately 4 per cent of the total population. Explanations for this overrepresentation include historical injustices – and the contemporary outcomes which are results of that history – faced by Indigenous peoples, as well as structural issues within the current criminal justice system itself. These issues include over-policing, ineffective representation in court, inadequate application of bail, and over-sentencing, which are all indications of systemic racism. While these issues affect Indigenous peoples broadly, there are specific implications for Indigenous women and youth.

In 2017 indigenous leadership called upon the Canadian government to ratify the United Nations Declaration on the Rights of Indigenous Peoples (UNDRIP) and make other interventions. The government subsequently issued nineteen recommendations to improve outcomes for indigenous people in the correctional system.

== Background ==
Intergenerational trauma, or transgenerational trauma, can occur when an individual or group experiences a significant traumatic event. The larger the group that shares the experience, or length of time the experience is sustained, can amplify the trauma experienced. Individual or group trauma becomes intergenerational when the stress response affects how individuals raise their own children, including both how they parent, or their ability to parent effectively at all. If trauma is experienced over multiple generations, the effects of intergenerational trauma can accumulate. This concept has been evident in many nations with marginalized groups, such as African Americans in the United States, which affected multiple generations of people through systematic racism and policies which promoted segregation.

Multiple colonial processes enacted on Indigenous peoples, by the settler state, are the root causes of intergenerational trauma negatively affecting Indigenous peoples today. These include dispossession of Indigenous lands through the Numbered Treaties where Indigenous peoples were given limited reserve land and restriction of personal freedoms through the enactment of the pass system. Additionally, Indigenous family units were disrupted through the residential school system and the Sixties Scoop, which caused further trauma by forcibly assimilating Indigenous children into Western society. Further, specific Indian Act legislation was passed that sought to erase Indigenous culture, language, and disrupt gender equality within Indigenous communities. Ultimately, the settler state endeavoured to assimilate and enfranchise all Indigenous Peoples into the dominant society.

The combination of these colonial processes created a complex history of trauma for Indigenous peoples; however, of all the contributing factors, the residential school system has been identified as of primary significance because of the various forms of abuse used on Indigenous youth and the gradual elimination of Indigenous practices and language over time. This is due to both its multigenerational nature and the age at which individuals experienced the trauma associated with residential schooling.

Contemporary outcomes stemming from intergenerational trauma experienced by Indigenous peoples are overrepresentation in all negative categories of social determinants of poor health including poverty, precarious housing and employment, experience with violence, and disrupted family and support systems.

These factors all contribute to engagements with the criminal justice system.

== Historical relations between police and Indigenous peoples ==
The North-West Mounted Police were created in 1874 for the purpose of bringing "British justice" to the Canadian west. General Order of 1890: No native prisoner allowed outside the guard room without a ball and chain represented a shift in attitudes. [no source]

== Issues within the criminal justice system ==
=== Over-policing ===
Police have wide discretionary powers over surveillance of and intervention against individuals in public. Indigenous peoples are twice as likely to be chosen to be surveilled by, or intervened with, by police due to racist stereotypes that criminalize Indigenous people. This results in Indigenous people being over charged both in the volume and severity of offences.

=== Ineffective representation ===
Accused persons have access to three types of representation in Canada, duty counsel, defence counsel, and self-representation.

Duty counsel is a provincially managed legal aid system that provides free services to accused persons at their first court appearance if they are otherwise unrepresented. Duty counsel is responsible for supporting accused persons in understanding their legal rights, the legal process, and specifics relating to their case, investigation, or engagement with police. Duty counsel is provided to ensure that every accused is afforded their right to counsel as articulated in paragraph 10(b) of the Canadian Charter of Rights and Freedoms. Duty counsel has been found ineffective in multiple ways including significant delays in reaching duty counsel in some jurisdictions, and communication barriers between the accused and duty counsel due to intoxication, mental state, or disability. Further, duty counsel may be under resourced or overburdened, and the combinations of these ineffective factors can be enhanced in the presence of bias or racism. The overrepresentation of Indigenous peoples in the justice system reproduces false racist narratives of their criminality that inform counsel. Additionally, cultural and language barriers may exist between Indigenous persons and their duty counsel further impeding their access to effective representation.

Defence counsel can be prohibitively expensive for individuals experiencing poverty. Accused persons can seek the services of legal aid for defence counsel however, it can be difficult to secure effective counsel. Often legal aid defence lawyers face similar impairments of being under resourced and overburdened while experiencing cultural and language barriers between themselves and their assigned clients. As with duty counsel, these factors can be aggravated in the presence of bias.

Increasingly, accused persons are choosing to self-represent as is their right. Approximately 40 per cent of individuals appearing in family court appear in absence of counsel, and the trend of increased persons self-representing in also experienced in civil court proceedings. The primary reasons individuals have chosen to self-represent are financial inaccessibility of effective counsel and dissatisfaction with existing counsel. The risk associated with self-representation is that laypersons are not educated in the law or the judicial process and they can become overwhelmed to their own detriment. Self-represented litigants are less likely to achieve fair settlements, have worse outcomes in family and financial matters and their cases take substantially longer to come to conclusion.

=== Inadequate application of bail ===
In Canada there are three bail options to be granted at the discretion of the judge based on the effective arguments of both the defence and the prosecution. Those options include release without conditions, undertaking with conditions, and recognizance. The latter two include a promise to appear in court, posting of a financial surety, and have escalating sets of conditions at the discretion of the judge. Breaching either of these may result in forfeiture of the surety and/or additional criminal charges, and breaching recognizance may be accompanied by additional fines.

Indigenous peoples often are not granted a bail option as they are perceived as ineligible due to family scenarios, financial positions, or a bias perception that Indigenous persons are more likely to re-offend. The overrepresentation of Indigenous peoples in the justice system reproduces false racist narratives of their criminality that inform both judges and the prosecution.

Indigenous accused report that the conditions of associated with bail are often unreasonable, specifically for those in small, isolated communities as they may include limitations on who you may or may not have contact with. Additionally, abstinence conditions are difficult to comply with for individuals, without support, who experience substance abuse issues.

Poverty, precarious employment, and acting as a single caregiver are incentivizing factors to plead guilty. Innocence pleas require trial and bail must be granted to the accused to avoid pre-trial detention. Indigenous people may falsely plead guilty due to poverty, to avoid unreasonable restrictions on their movements or to detention to satisfy employment or care giving obligations.

=== Over-sentencing ===
Once in front of a judge, Indigenous peoples in Canada have historically received more and longer incarceration sentences. The Supreme Court of Canada decision in R v Gladue both recognized this issue, and mandated justices to allow for provisions in sentencing that considered the historical and socio-economic factors that bring Indigenous peoples before the court, in order to reduce Indigenous over representation in the carceral system.

Despite this ruling, Gladue principles are inconsistently and unreliably used so there has been little positive impact to Indigenous peoples since the ruling in 1999.

=== Specific issues for Indigenous women in the justice system ===
Indigenous women comprise 42 per cent of women in custody. This is despite the fact that they comprise 4.9 per cent of the female population of Canada.

Indigenous women experience higher rates of poverty, precarious employment, and are statistically more likely to be single care givers. Additionally, they are statistically more likely to experience violence. The combination of these factors results in Indigenous women being significantly more likely to experience precarious housing or houselessness which is a factor in engagements with the criminal justice system. Further, intergenerational trauma and gender inequality has resulted in Indigenous women experiencing higher rates of post-traumatic stress syndrome and addiction. Mental health and addictions issues are also key factors in engagement with the criminal justice system. Due to the combination of all these factors Indigenous women are statistically more likely to participate in survival sex work, an activity criminalized in Canada.

=== Specific issues for Indigenous youth in the justice system ===
Indigenous youth make up 43 per cent of youth in custody despite being 8 per cent of Canada's youth population.

Due to the colonial legacy of the destruction of the Indigenous family unit through the residential school system, Indigenous youth are statistically more likely to come from single care giver homes resulting in less support and supervision.

Additionally, the intergenerational trauma from both the historical legacy and contemporary structural nature of colonialism, negatively impacts Indigenous parents resulting in Indigenous youth being overrepresented in the foster care system. Indigenous youth represent 52 per cent of all youth in care.

Youth who spend time in care are statistically more likely to have engagements with the criminal justice system

=== Systemic racism ===
In addition to the various public apologies given to the Indigenous community by various Canadian officials, the Canadian Department of Justice has formally recognized the prevalence of systemic discrimination within the criminal justice system.

== Responses ==
Indigenous leadership, including the Assembly of First Nations and the Métis National Council, have recognized the severity of the issue of Indigenous overrepresentation in the criminal justice system. Subsequently, they have called upon the Canadian federal government to, among other interventions, commit to ratifying the United Nations Declaration on the Rights of Indigenous Peoples (UNDRIP).

UNDRIP articles 5 and 40 both advocate for Indigenous nations to revitalize and employ traditional legal structures for their peoples. Additionally, article 13.2 speaks to effective representation and participation by clarifying the requirement for language accessibility in all legal and official proceedings.

Similarly, the Truth and Reconciliation Commission of Canada, calls to action 50–52 seek for the improvement of equity for Indigenous peoples within the Canadian legal system.

In 2018, the Canadian federal government issued a report on the Standing Committee on Public Safety and National Security's investigation on Indigenous overrepresentation in the criminal justice system and subsequently issued 19 recommendations to improve equity of outcomes for Indigenous peoples.

In 2023-2024, Indigenous adults were incarcerated at a rate approximately ten times higher than non-indigenous adults in the six Canadian provinces for which data were available. Indigenous adults accounted for 33.2% of the custodial population in those provinces, despite representing 4.3% of their combined adult population.

== See also ==
- Criminal sentencing of Indigenous peoples in Canada
- R v Ipeelee
