= Criminal sentencing in Canada =

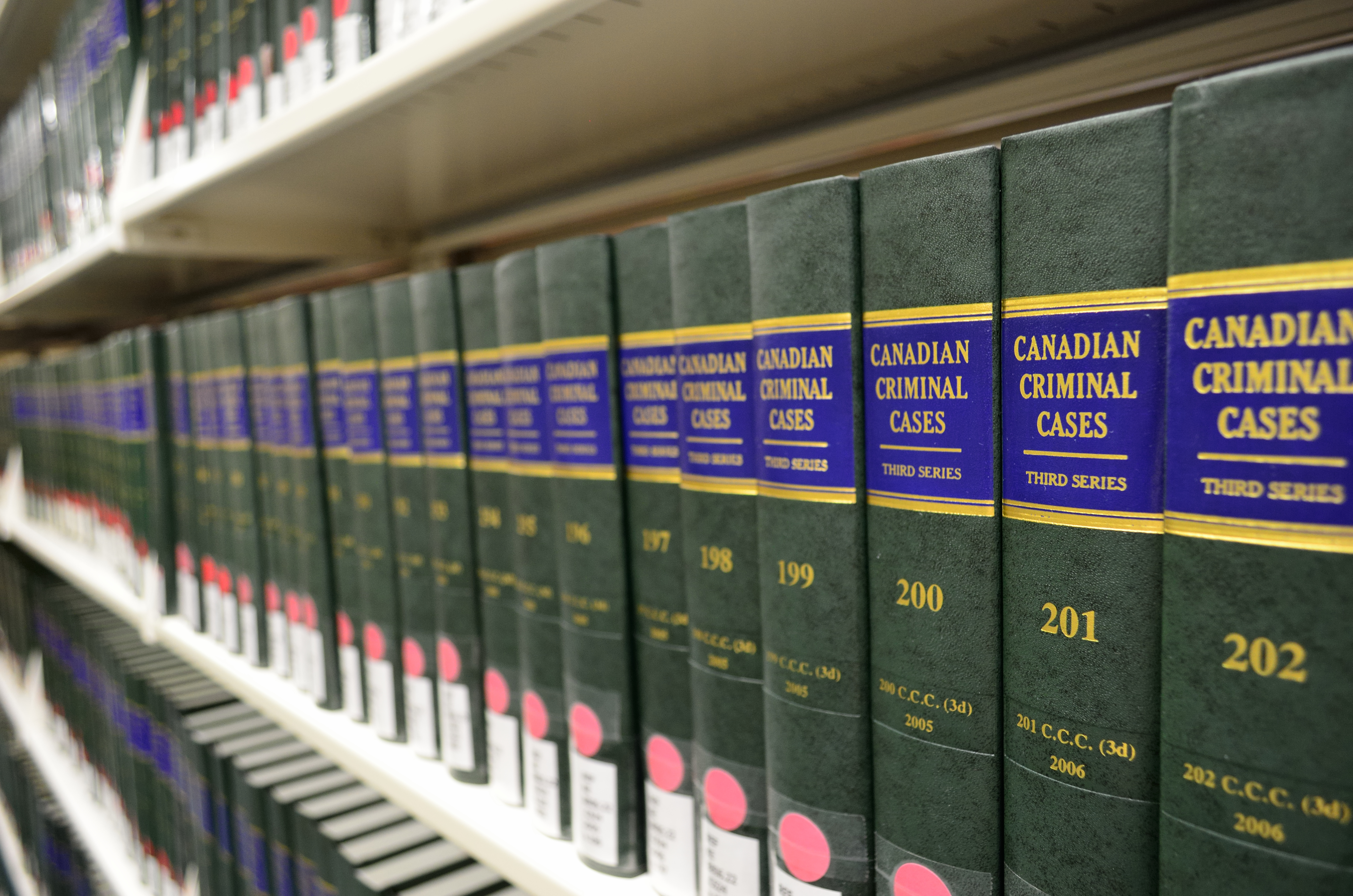
Canadian Criminal Cases collection

Canadian criminal law is governed by the Criminal Code, which includes the principles and powers in relation to criminal sentencing in Canada.

A judge sentences a person after they have been found guilty of a crime. After a determination is made about the facts being relied on for sentencing, and hearing from both the Crown and the defence about what the appropriate sentence should be, the judge must pick from a number of different sentencing options found in the Criminal Code, based on a number of factors. Some offences have a minimum sentence, and there may also be a maximum sentence depending on the nature of the offence.

The maximum determinate sentence is a life sentence with a 25-year parole ineligibility period. For offences committed prior to 2 December 2011 all life sentences and related parole ineligibility periods are served concurrently (at the same time). In cases of multiple murder, where the offence occurred after 2 December 2011 (the date new legislation came into force), a court may, after considering any jury recommendation, order consecutive parole ineligibility periods for each murder. There are also options for an indeterminate sentence. There is no death penalty in Canada, making life imprisonment the most severe punishment to be imposed in the country.

== Sentencing hearing ==
When a person is found guilty of a crime, a finding has been made that all essential elements of the offence have been met (either by admission through a guilty plea or after the elements have been proven beyond a reasonable doubt in a trial). However, there may be facts that did not have to be determined for the defendant's guilt to be decided (i.e. severity of a victim's injuries, motivation for the crime, etc.). If the guilty verdict was determined by a jury, the judge may have to determine what facts the jury relied on to reach their verdict (since jury deliberations are confidential in Canada).

When the additional facts are in dispute, the party relying on the fact has the burden to prove it. The general standard of proof at a sentencing hearing is a "balance of probabilities". If the Crown, however, is relying on an aggravating fact or a prior conviction, the burden of proof is "beyond a reasonable doubt".

There are a number of exceptions to the normal rules of evidence. For example, the judge may permit hearsay evidence. A probation officer can interview the defendant and other people associated with the defendant and file a report. A victim impact statement may be filed with the court (with the option of having it read out by the victim). The defendant is also given an opportunity to personally speak to the court.

=== Appeals ===
Either the Crown or the accused may appeal against a sentence. An appellant must demonstrate that either the sentence imposed was "demonstrably unfit" or the court "erred in principle," for example by placing undue emphasis on a particular sentence principle. Except for an appeal against a finding that the accused is a dangerous or long-term offender, the court upon allowing an appeal must then determine a fit sentence and may not remit the matter back to the court of first instance. The court of appeal considers the sentence anew and the sentence may be more or less severe than the sentence imposed, regardless of who appealed; this is referred to as the "Hill Principle."

There are some additional considerations taken into account at an appeal. Given the high stakes for both the accused and the safety of the public, fresh evidence of post-sentence conduct is routinely admitted. Where the appellant was granted bail pending appeal and has presented fresh evidence indicating that reincarceration would be unduly harsh, the court of appeal may reduce a sentence despite the absence of a reviewable error. Where the Crown appeals against the sentence and the court of appeal determines that a longer period of incarceration is warranted, the court will often stay the order if the accused has been out of custody for a lengthy period of time or has fully complied with the terms of a non-carceral sentence. The court of appeal will only order the re-incarceration of the accused in cases where the facts support it or where the additional period of incarceration is substantial. Accused persons will also be given credit for complying with the terms of a non-carceral sentence.

=== Variations ===
Under the Criminal Code and the Youth Criminal Justice Act the original sentencing judge retains jurisdiction to vary a sentence imposed under a very limited number of circumstances. A probation order can be varied at the request of the accused, probation officer or the prosecution. Under s. 732.2(3) of the Criminal Code a court that sentenced the accused (or a court to which the probation order is transferred under s. 733(1)) may modify the conditions, relieve compliance of a condition or decrease the duration of the probation order. The length of probation cannot be increased since this would infringe section 11(h) of the Charter. There is virtually no case law on the constitutionality of variations rendering the probation order more onerous, such as adding terms and conditions. Conditional sentences may be varied in a similar matter except the duration cannot be varied.

Where the court imposes a driving prohibition over 5 years, the Parole Board of Canada may decrease the period of prohibition after 5 years where the court-imposed prohibition is less than life or after 10 years where the court imposed prohibition was life.

Where the court imposes a fine and specifies a required time period to pay the fine, the accused may apply to the court for an extension of the period to pay a fine. Courts will usually only grant the variation, however, if the accused has made a reasonable attempt to pay the fine or has a reasonable excuse for failure to do so. They also can appeal to get a stay at home leave.

== Purpose and principles of sentencing ==
=== Purpose ===
Section 718 of the Criminal Code sets out the purposes of sentencing and acts to protect society and to contribute, along with crime prevention initiatives, respect for the law and the maintenance of a just, peaceful and safe society by imposing just sanctions that include one or more of a codified list of sentencing objectives, as follows:

- Denunciation
- Deterrence
- Separation of offenders
- Rehabilitation
- Reparation
- Promotion of responsibility

=== Principles ===
There are a number of sentencing principles found in sections 718.1 and 718.2 of the Criminal Code:

- The sentence must be proportionate to the nature of the offence.
- The sentence must be reduced or increased depending on the mitigating and aggravating factors.
- The sentence must be similar to sentences imposed on similar offenders for similar offences in similar circumstances, but it remains open to the sentencing judge to deviate from the range.
- If the sentence is consecutive, it must not be unduly long or harsh.
- An offender should not be deprived of their liberty if less restrictive sanctions are appropriate.
- All available sanctions other than imprisonment that are reasonable in the circumstances should be considered, with particular attention for aboriginal offenders.

== Specific offenders ==
=== Aboriginal offenders ===
The Supreme Court of Canada has held that widespread discrimination against Indigenous Peoples living in Canada, and the resulting adverse socio-economic factors they face, are the sources for their over-representation at all points of the criminal justice system. Accordingly, and as per section 718.2(e) of the Criminal Code, the court is required to consider all reasonable alternatives to imprisonment for all offenders, with particular attention to the circumstances of Aboriginal Peoples. This section was historically interpreted narrowly as requiring particular attention only to those who live on-reserve. Application of this section was clarified in R. v. Gladue where the Supreme Court held that it applied to Aboriginal offenders generally, not only to those living on-reserve. The court found as a matter of judicial notice that the Aboriginal Peoples have a long-standing disadvantage in Canadian society and the effects are felt for generations.

Aboriginal heritage requires the court to place a higher emphasis on alternatives to incarceration that are based on traditional Aboriginal justice principles such as restorative justice, where community members and the victim will be involved in the process. However, where the crime is more serious in nature, Aboriginal heritage plays a lesser role as courts will place a higher emphasis on protection of the public, denunciation and general deterrence. Moreover s. 718.2(e) is not a substantive power which allows a court to impose a sentence outside the legally acceptable range. For instance, where an offender faces a 4-year minimum sentence, the court cannot sentence below that.

=== Youth offenders ===
Youth are sentenced under a different regime found in the Youth Criminal Justice Act (YCJA). The YCJA also dictates how and when a court can order a youth sentenced under the adult regime.

== Aggravating factors ==
There are a number of aggravating factors a judge is required to consider both at common law and by statute. Common-law factors include whether or not the victim was a vulnerable victim (children, taxi drivers, late-night clerks, etc.).

General statutory aggravating factors are found in section 718.2 of the Criminal Code. They are:

- Motivation due to bias, prejudice, or hate
- Domestic violence
- Abuse of person under 18 years old
- Breach of trust or authority
- Offence was committed for the benefit of, at the direction of, or in association with a criminal organization
- Terrorism offences

There are also specific aggravating factors for organizations found guilty of an offence. In addition, some offences have their own specific aggravating factors. For example, section 255.1 of the Criminal Code makes it an aggravating factor if a person commits a drinking and driving offence when their blood alcohol concentration is in excess of 0.160.

== Prior findings of guilt ==
The court is allowed to take into account prior findings of guilt when determining the appropriate sentence.

For some offences, a prior finding of guilt will create a higher minimum sentence. However, the court cannot rely on the higher minimum sentence unless the Crown notified the defendant prior to defendant's plea. Even if the defendant was not notified, or the Crown chooses not to file the notice with the court, the court can still rely on the prior finding of guilt as an aggravating factor.

== Credit for pre-trial custody ==
If a defendant spent time in custody while awaiting his trial (that is, he was not released on bail), the judge is allowed to take that into account when determining the sentence. There used to be no specific formula, and historically judges generally gave a "2 for 1" credit for pre-trial custody. This was subsequently changed by legislation.

In 2009, the Parliament of Canada passed the Truth in Sentencing Act which mostly eliminated a judge's discretion to give credit for pre-trial custody beyond one day for every day served. The bill received Royal Assent on 23 October 2009 and came into force on 22 February 2010. The new law came into effect on 1 March 2010, but the new law does not apply to accused persons taken into custody before that date.

The new rules are as follows:

1. Generally, the maximum credit a judge may give for pre-trial custody is one day for every day served.
2. A judge has discretion to increase the credit to 1.5 days for every day of pre-trial custody, provided the person was not detained due to prior convictions or because they were breaching their bail.

R v Hussain (2018) ruled it unfair to punish a person twice for bail condition breaches. Regarding bail breaches if a sentence is ruled then the judge must consider credit for pre-trial custody which previously were automatically refused. In R v Hussain, the judge awarded Suleman Hussain with 1.5 days for every day in custody pre trial.

Pre-trial custody can be used to reduce a minimum sentence.

There is no specific sentencing option called "time served." If credit for pre-trial custody is equal to or greater than what the appropriate sentence would be, the trial judge will either suspend the sentence, or sentence the person to one day (which will have the practical effect of just requiring the person to report once in person to the prison).

Pre-trial custody has no effect on a life sentence, and does not affect when a person can apply for parole. It is sometimes referred to as "dead time."

== Sentencing options ==
| Type of sentence | Description |
|---|---|
| Absolute/conditional discharge | Available if accused is not subject to a minimum penalty and the offence is not one punishable with a maximum sentence of 14 years' imprisonment or life imprisonment; Sentence results in a finding of guilt rather than a conviction; Absolute discharge purged after one year, and a conditional discharge after three years; May not be recognized by the United States for entry purposes |
| Suspended sentence | Available if accused is not subject to a minimum penalty; Accused is placed on probation for up to three years; Sentence may be revoked by sentencing court if accused fails to abide by terms of probation |
| Fine | Accused may be fined up to CA$5000 for summary offences or any amount for indictable offences; Court must consider ability to pay; Fine option programs available in certain jurisdictions (performing community service in lieu of paying fine); Range of civil remedies for default |
| Imprisonment for under two years | Accused eligible for conditional sentence if criteria are met; Accused eligible for sentence abatement of 1 day for every 2 days served, provided the accused is of good behaviour and obeys the institution rules; Sentence may be combined with either probation or a fine, but not both |
| Imprisonment for two years or more | Accused eligible for parole after serving one-third of the sentence imposed, unless court orders that parole may not be sought until the accused has served the lesser of one-half of the sentence imposed or 10 years; Accused persons receive mandatory release for statutory release after serving two-thirds of sentence imposed.; Those accused sentenced to life imprisonment or to indeterminate sentences (for offences other than murder or high treason) are eligible for parole after 7 years but are not eligible for statutory release. |

=== Absolute and conditional discharges ===
If it is in the best interests of the accused, and not contrary to the public interest, a judge may discharge an accused after a finding of guilt. A discharge is only possible if there is no minimum sentence for the offence, and the offence is not punishable by 14 years of imprisonment or a life sentence. When the court grants a discharge, the accused is not considered to have been convicted of the crime, notwithstanding the finding of guilt.

A discharge may be absolute or conditional. If conditional, the defendant will have to comply with terms under a probation order (described in more detail below). If the accused breaches the terms of the conditional discharge, the court which made the order can revoke the conditional discharge and sentence the accused for the offence.

The effect of a discharge is that it will not be considered a criminal record. An absolute discharge is purged after one year. A conditional discharge is purged after three years.

While a discharge does not result in a criminal conviction, there is a finding of guilt. This finding can be used in civil proceedings and may result in refusal of entry into the United States which does not currently recognize discharges or pardons.

=== Probation and suspended sentences ===
==== Probation orders ====
Probation may be ordered in combination with other sentencing options, or if there is no minimum sentence, on its own as a suspended sentence. Probation cannot be ordered in combination with a term of imprisonment of more than two years, and it cannot be in combination of both a fine and imprisonment. If an individual is subject to a probation order and subsequently convicted of a different offence and receives a sentence which results in imprisonment for over two years, the probation order is not voided.

The maximum length of a probation order is 3 years.

A probation order will require the defendant to comply with a number of conditions. Some of the conditions are mandatory: "keep the peace and be of good behaviour", appear in court when required to do so, and notify the court and probation officer of any change of address or employment. There are also a number of optional terms, which include reporting conditions, non-consumption conditions, non-possession conditions, non-attendance conditions, non-association/communication conditions, and treatment conditions. Community service can be part of a probation order, with a maximum of 240 hours, over a maximum period of 18 months.

Failure to comply with a probation order is a criminal offence. Committing an offence while bound by a probation order means the offender failed to comply with the order, due to the mandatory condition of "keep the peace and be of good behaviour".

==== Suspended sentence ====
Where the court sentences the accused to a suspended sentence, the accused is placed on probation for a period of up to three years. During this time the accused must comply with these conditions. A suspended sentence is not considered a final sentence, since an accused who is convicted of breaching the conditions of the probation order may in addition to being sentenced for the offence of breach of probation, may also have the suspended sentence revoked. Once a suspended sentence is revoked, the court which originally sentenced the accused may re-sentence the accused. This has been held not to be a case of double jeopardy since a suspended sentence is not a final order.

=== Fine ===
A fine can be ordered on its own or in addition to probation or imprisonment. It cannot be ordered in combination of both probation and imprisonment.

If the offence is a summary conviction offence (or a hybrid offence where the Crown elects to proceed summarily), the maximum fine is $5,000, unless otherwise stated in the statute.

Before a court imposes a fine, it must inquire into the ability to pay the fine.

Failure to pay the fine by the time required in the order can result in the person being found in default. A number of remedies exist, including imprisonment. In the past a court that imposed a fine would also impose a hypothetical sentence in the event of default. This led to gross inconsistencies so in 1995 Parliament created a fixed formula for determining the number of days of imprisonment. This formula is determined by taking the unpaid amount and any costs associated with incarcerating the accused as the numerator and eight times the provincial minimum wage as the denominator. For example, an unpaid fine of $640 in a jurisdiction with a minimum wage of $8 hourly would be approximately 10 days.

In addition, unless waived by the court, the defendant is required to pay a victim fine surcharge in addition to whatever else the judge imposes as sentence. The surcharge is 30% of the fine imposed or, if no fine is imposed, $100 for an indictable offence and $50 for an offence punishable on summary conviction. This amount may be increased or decreased depending on the discretion of the court.

=== Restitution ===
Restitution can be ordered by the court for any property damage, lost or stolen property, or any physical or psychological injuries suffered by a victim.

=== Conditional sentence ===
A conditional sentence is a sentence of imprisonment which is served in the community, usually under very onerous conditions. The common vernacular for this type of sentence is "house arrest." Since its introduction in 1997, its availability has greatly narrowed. Originally a conditional sentence was available when the following conditions were met: (1) Court finds imprisonment under two years appropriate; (2) permitting the offender to serve his sentence in the community would not endanger the public; and (3) the imposition of a conditional sentence is consistent with the fundamental principles of sentencing. It was not available where for offences carrying a mandatory minimum sentence of imprisonment.

In 2008 additional restrictions were added. A conditional sentence is not available for offences which are considered "serious personal injury offences." The current law bars the use of a conditional sentence for additional offences, such as sex offences, theft over $5000, terrorism offences and any offence which carries a maximum term of imprisonment of fourteen years or life.

=== Imprisonment ===
==== General rules ====
If the offence is a summary conviction offence (or a hybrid offence where the Crown elects to proceed summarily), the maximum sentence of imprisonment is 2 years less a day, unless otherwise stated by statute.

If the offence is an indictable offence (or a hybrid offence where the Crown elects to proceed by indictment), the maximum sentence of imprisonment is 5 years, unless otherwise stated by statute.

Generally, a judge has the discretion to order a sentence to be served concurrently (at the same time) or consecutively (one after the other) with any other sentence a defendant is serving, or any other sentence arising out of the same transaction.

If the total sentence is two years or more or one of life imprisonment, the defendant will serve their sentence in a federal penitentiary. If the total sentence is less than two years, the defendant will serve their sentence in a provincial jail.

A sentencing judge also has the power to delay the time before a defendant is allowed to apply for parole. The maximum parole ineligibility period is half of the sentence or ten years, whichever comes first, unless the defendant is sentenced to life imprisonment.

==== Life imprisonment ====
Life imprisonment is the mandatory sentence in all cases of high treason or murder. Life imprisonment is also a possible maximum penalty for a range of other offences, but the sentence is only mandatory in cases of high treason or murder. When an accused is sentenced to life imprisonment for murder or high treason, then the following parole ineligibility periods apply (which includes youths sentenced as an adult):

| Offence/circumstances | Parole ineligibility period |
|---|---|
| High treason, first-degree murder (with no additional circumstances) or second degree murder by an offender previously convicted of murder | 25 years |
| Second degree murder (with no additional circumstances) | 10–25 years |
| First degree murder (16 or 17 years old at time of the offence) | 10 years |
| Second degree murder (16 or 17 years old at time of the offence) | 7 years |
| First or second degree murder (14 or 15 years old at time of the offence) | 5–7 years |

When a jury convicts a person of second-degree murder, they can recommend to the judge a parole ineligibility period, but the judge is not bound by the jury's recommendation.

In cases of multiple murder, after considering the jury's recommendation (if there is one), a court may also order that the parole ineligibility period be served consecutively to the one being served. Amendments to the Criminal Code in 2011 permit the judge to impose consecutive parole ineligibility periods for first or second-degree murders committed as part of the same "transaction" (or as part of the same series of offences). One of the first cases where the new sentencing provisions were used was a multiple murder in Edmonton, Alberta of three armoured car guards by one of their co-workers. The perpetrator in that case was sentenced to life in prison with no chance of parole for 40 years - 25 years for one first degree murder conviction, ordered to be served consecutively to two concurrent 15-year parole ineligibility periods for two second-degree murder convictions as part of the same series of offences. Subsequent to this sentence Justin Bourque, convicted of the first-degree murders of three RCMP officers in Moncton, New Brunswick in 2014, was sentenced to life in prison with no chance of parole for 75 years. Consecutive parole ineligibility periods were also imposed in the case of serial killer John Paul Ostamas in June 2016, who was sentenced to life in prison with no chance of parole for 75 years for the second-degree murders of three homeless men in Winnipeg, Manitoba.

==== Parole and remission ====
An accused person serving a sentence of less than two years is eligible for remission against the sentence at a maximum rate of 1 day for every 2 days served, provided the accused is of good behaviour and obeys the rules of the institution. Remission credits abate the actual sentence and effectively most accused serve two-thirds of the sentence imposed (e.g. an accused sentenced to 12 months' imprisonment will be deemed to have completed the full term after serving 8 months). While the sentence may deemed to be served for some purposes, for other purposes, remission is irrelevant. For instance, the delay period for an application for a criminal record suspension (formerly called a pardon) disregards any remission earned.

An accused person serving a determinate sentence, other than life imprisonment, is eligible for statutory release after serving two-thirds of the sentence. Unlike remission, the sentence is not abated; rather the accused person will be released on parole and will be subject to conditions for the last one-third of the sentence. The Parole Board of Canada may refuse statutory release for certain accused persons or for certain offences, and as such, many accused persons end up serving their entire sentence in custody and are only released on their warrant expiry date.

Any accused person sentenced to a term of imprisonment greater than six months may apply for parole after serving one-third of the sentence. (Until 2011, where an offender was sentenced to a term of 2 years or more, the offence was non-violent, and the offence was included in the list of eligible offences under the Corrections and Conditional Release Act, the accused person was eligible for release after serving one-sixth of the sentence or six months, whichever was greater. However, this possibility was removed as a result of legislation that was passed by Parliament in 2011.)

An accused person granted parole is still legally subject to a warrant of committal and is deemed to be "in custody." This will be the case until the expiry of the term of imprisonment. If a convicted person is sentenced to a life sentence or an indeterminate sentence, the accused will be subject to the jurisdiction of the Parole Board of Canada and be electronically tagged for the rest of their life.

| Type of remission | Two years or more | Less Than two years |
|---|---|---|
| Remission | Ineligible | Two weeks remission for every month served if the accused is of good behaviour and obeys the rules of the institution |
| Parole | One-third of sentence (one-half in some cases) or 7 years if sentenced to life or to an indeterminate sentence for non-murder/non-high treason offences | One-third of sentence (temporary absence available after serving one-sixth of sentence) |

=== Long term offenders ===
If a person is convicted for their third or more offence found in section 752 of the Criminal Code, the Crown can apply for the person to be declared a long term offender. The Crown can only make such applications with the consent of the provincial Attorney General.

A long term offender is a person where there is a substantial risk the offender will re-offend and be a danger to the community, but there is a reasonable possibility of eventually controlling the risk in the community.

When sentenced as a long term offender, the defendant must first serve their prison sentence, and then be placed on a long-term supervision order in the community for a maximum of 10 years.

=== Dangerous offenders ===
If a person is convicted for their third or more offence found in section 752 of the Criminal Code, the Crown can apply for the person to be declared a dangerous offender. The Crown can only make such applications with the consent of the provincial Attorney General.

A dangerous offender is a person where there is a substantial risk the person will re-offend and be a danger to the community, and there is no reasonable possibility of eventually controlling the risk in the community.

When sentenced as a dangerous offender, the defendant is placed on an indefinite sentence, where the accused may apply for parole after 7 years and every 2 years thereafter. Even if a dangerous offender is granted parole (which is rare), the offender is subject to indefinite supervision by the Parole Board of Canada for the rest of the convict's life.

=== Ancillary orders ===
A number of additional orders may be made by a judge at the time of sentencing - either optional or mandatory. These include weapon prohibitions, driving prohibitions, forfeiture of crime-related property, DNA orders, and sex offender registry orders.

== Constitutional issues ==
There are a number of constitutional rights guaranteed in the Canadian Charter of Rights and Freedoms that can affect criminal sentencing:

- Section 7 states "everyone has the right to life, liberty and security of the person and the right not to be deprived thereof except in accordance with the principles of fundamental justice." Since most criminal offences come with the risk of imprisonment, which impacts a person's liberty, the principles of fundamental justice must not be violated.
- Section 9 protects everyone from arbitrary imprisonment.
- Section 11(i) states that if the sentencing provisions are changed between the date of the offence and when the defendant is found guilty, the defendant gets the benefit of the lesser punishment.
- Section 12 states that "everyone has the right not to be subjected to any cruel and unusual treatment or punishment." This can impact both the type of sentence available (either generally or as applied to the specific offence) and the length of the sentence.

== See also ==
- List of youth detention incidents in Canada
- Criminal law of Canada
