= The Red Paper =

The Red Paper, also titled "Citizens Plus", is a policy proposal put forward by the Indian Association of Alberta (IAA) in 1970 under the leadership of Cree political leader Harold Cardinal. The Red Paper was a counter-proposal to the White Paper, a policy put forward by Pierre Trudeau's Minister of Indian Affairs, Jean Chrétien. The White Paper is also titled 1969 Statement of the Government of Canada on Indian Policy.

On January 22, 1970, the Indian Chiefs of Alberta sent a letter of concern addressed to Pierre Trudeau, in which they stated they had a first draft of a Red Paper counter-proposal and plan to complete the final draft in the near future, for presentation to the federal government. In June 1970, the Red Paper was published.

The White Paper suggested multiple policy changes such as: removal of the definition of "Indian" in the Constitution and of the special legal status of Indians; recognizing and giving credit to Indian cultural contribution to Canadian society; shifting Indian services to flow from the same channels as other Canadians; helping the reserves who are "furthest behind" first through economic development; recognizing the Crown's lawful obligations and transferring Crown lands to the Indian people. These proposals were all set forth, in effort by the Canadian government, to implement what it considered equal status for Indian people among Canadian society. The Red Paper response was the counter-proposal to each of these projects. The alternate policies requested the Canadian government to, in the same order: retain legal Indian status; preserve Indian culture through status, rights, lands and traditions; accept legislative responsibility for Indians; help all tribes rather than just the most impoverished; modernize the treaties and recognize that land title belongs to Indian people held in trust by Crown, rather than belonging to the Crown itself.

Where the White Paper proposed elimination of distinctive legal Indian citizenship, indicating "the full integration" of Indians into Canadian society, the Red Paper suggested a reformation, rather than abolition, of the current Indian policies, as well as several other suggestions.

== Historical background ==
The historical background listed in the Red Paper goes back to when the Crown established treaties with the Indigenous Peoples. The historical events that this sub section looks at are broad main events that have influenced the grievances listed in the Red Paper.

=== Treaties ===
With plans and ambitions for westward expansion, the Dominion of Canada entered negotiations with the Indigenous peoples who would tend for the land. The Crown sought to cede these lands; as expressed by Joseph Howe, the then Secretary of State of Canada, when he talked about the "necessity of arranging with the bands of Indians inhabiting the tract of the country between Thunder Bay and the Stone Fort, for the cession, subject to certain reserves such as they should select, of the lands occupied by them". While there was never a treaty allowing the cession of reserve land to the federal government, Section 91 of the British North America Act (1867) handed the authority of these reserves to the federal government.

According to the authors of the Red Paper, the treaty negotiations were made from a position of strength, as the Crown was under the impression that Indigenous groups were in weak bargaining positions. Due to the ceding of the land, benefits were promised to Indigenous Peoples, which were meant to be in perpetuity.

While promises were made to Indigenous groups verbally, these promises were not always reflected in the written treaties themselves. These promises created a disparity between what was orally promised and what was transcribed in the treaties. While Treaty 6 said that Indigenous Peoples have the right to pursue hunting and fishing "subject to such regulations as may from time to time be made", in the negotiations, Lieutenant Governor Morris mentioned that "You are at liberty to hunt as before."

This disparity was also seen when Indigenous Peoples asked for the supply of medicine chests, and such requests were accounted for in treaties six and seven, however, it was not accounted for in Treaty 8. This medical care was promised, as stated on the commissioner's report on September 22, 1899.

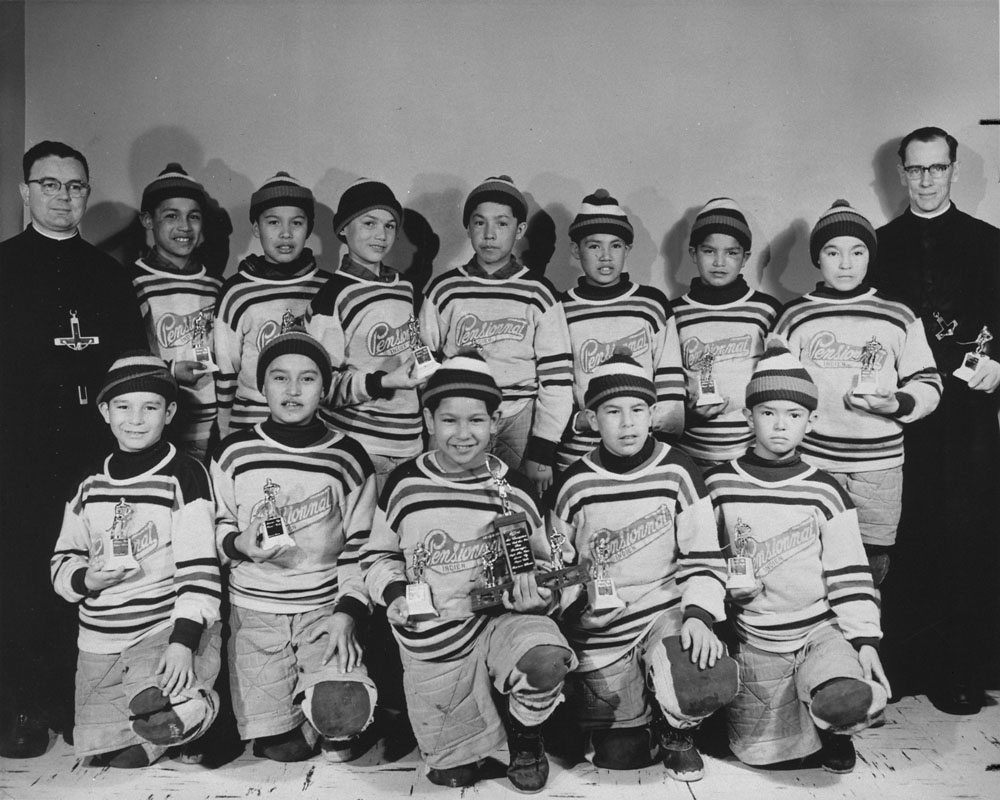
The children of a residential school along with two priests, in Maliotenam, Quebec

=== Residential schools ===
The legacy of residential schools is related to the Red Paper and to the history of Indigenous peoples in Canada. These schools started in the 17th century and the last few were shut down in the 1990s. These schools were mainly run by the churches, and the federal government played a key role in funding these schools. The schools were initially set up to assimilate Indigenous youth with what was considered mainstream culture; however, they had negative impacts on communities. Some of the negative impacts experienced by the children forced into the system included "harsh discipline, malnutrition, poor healthcare, physical, emotional and sexual abuse, neglection, and the deliberate suppression of their cultures and languages". In Canada's history, there were a total of 130 residential schools, which were responsible for the deaths of an estimated 6000 children. When the White Paper was written, residential schools had not been closed down entirely, and the trauma and the subjugation inflicted on Indigenous peoples was still on-going.

=== History leading up to the White Paper ===
The civil rights movements in the United States of America brought the subjugation of minorities to the forefront of public consciousness. Based on these movements, the Canadian federal government started to examine the socio-economic barriers faced by Indigenous Peoples. This led to the government commissioning Harry B. Hawthorn to conduct research on Indigenous communities across Canada. These findings had culminated in the Hawthorn report. Based on his findings, Hawthorn concluded that Indigenous Peoples were "citizens minus" and cited various failures in governance as reasons for the unequal social conditions. His report additionally called for the shut down of any form of "forced assimilation programs". A main form of forced assimilation in Canada could be seen through the Residential Schools.

Based on the report, the government decided to engage in consultation with various Indigenous Communities, and proceeded to amend the Indian Act. Following regional discussions, in 1969, various leaders of Indigenous nations had been called to Ottawa for a meeting with the federal government. Based on the findings of the Hawthorn report, in conjunction with the various discussions that they federal government had with Indigenous Nations, the White Paper was written.

These historical backgrounds played a key role in advising the policies and the advocacies outlined in the Red Paper.

== Rejected White Paper policies ==
The 1970 Citizens Plus document, or "The Red Paper", put forward by the Indian Chiefs of Alberta expresses significant frustration with the federal government's White Paper proposal, believing that "it offers despair instead of hope". As such, it included counter-policy in which certain policies presented in the White Paper were either rejected outright, or with some type of alternative.

The first to be addressed is the White Paper's proposal to remove Indian status. The Citizens Plus document rejects this, stating that "[r]etaining the legal status of Indians is necessary if Indians are to be treated justly. Justice requires that the special history, rights, and circumstances of Indian People be recognized." They believe that in order to preserve their culture, the recognition of Indian status must remain in place.

The Red Paper goes on to reject the proposal of services provided to Indigenous people becoming the responsibility of provincial governments. They state that the federal government is legislatively responsible for "Indians and Indian lands" as per the British North America Act, 1867. They argue that their people have paid for these services by surrendering their land and the federal government is therefore required to provide services related to health, welfare, and education.

The White Paper also proposes what it calls "enriched services" for those who are "furthest behind" and require additional help. The response in the Citizens Plus document simply rejects this, believing that the promise of "enriched services" are merely bribes by the federal government to accept the rest of the policy which will result in further division of Indigenous people.

The Red Paper also rejects what was presented regarding Indigenous land. While they agree with the intent behind giving control of "Indian lands" to "Indian people", the document states that there are two important errors made by the federal government. The first of which, the document states, is that the government "thinks that Indian Reserve lands are owned by the Crown". The Red Paper corrects this, stating that such lands are held in trust, rather than owned, by the Crown. The significance of this correction is explained further, as land held in trust can therefore not be sold or broken up. As such, the document is against any change that would allow individual ownership of the land with the rights to sell. The Indian Chiefs of Alberta go on to correct what they state is an assumption made by the government that control of land can only take place if said land is owned in the same fashion as ordinary property. The Red Paper concludes this section by stating that "Indian lands...must be held forever in trust of the Crown".

The proposal put forward by the White Paper to repeal the Indian Act is also rejected. While they believe it essential to review the Indian Act, the Red Paper argues that it provides the legal framework for Indian people that federal or provincial governments would to other Canadians.

Furthermore, the Red Paper rejects the proposal to abolish the Indian Affairs Branch, stating that there will always be a need for it. While the Red Paper believed there to be issues with the Indian Affairs Branch, they argue that it should be changed in accordance to the needs of Indigenous peoples, providing direct access to the federal government.

An appointment of a sole commissioner is also rejected. The White Paper's proposal of this commissioner states that the appointment would happen by the government alone, and it is there that the Red Paper takes issue. Because this appointment would happen without any consultation whatsoever, the proposal is rejected.

== Red Paper provisions ==
Subsequently intertwined within the many rejections of the White Paper, Citizens Plus also lists a plethora of ideas and recommendations intended to help effect productive change in Indian policy. In its essence, while the Red Paper rejects the white-leaning narrative of the White Paper, it also advocates largely for the reformation of many standing Canadian policies in an attempt to more appropriately amplify the Indian voice in Canada. Listed below are the many corrections, additional programs, measures, and overall philosophies the paper employs as both recommendations and demands on behalf of Indigenous people in rejection of the White Paper.

First, the Red Paper advocates for a change in perspective when observing Indigenous presence in Canada. As mentioned in Section B.2 Unique Indian Culture and Contribution, the Red Paper strives to encourage the Canadian ideal of "pluralism" as all inclusive, compelling readers to understand ancestral historical Indian as "old colourful roots in that Canadian fabric of diversity." In this section the Red Paper also advocates for the usefulness of Indigenous presence in Canada, stating how "Everyone should recognize that Indians have contributed much to the Canadian community." The Red Paper assumes the position that Indian affairs in Canada have been forthright and honest, and that Indian people have continued to serve the Dominion of Canada loyally under the Queen of the United Kingdom since the conception of Treaties in Alberta. Further, Citizens Plus explains the necessary sanctity of honouring the many Numbered Treaties beyond just written word, to actually embracing the promises of land-sharing instead of land-holding originally outlined in the Numbered Treaties of Alberta. Stated in the Red Paper are two distinct "immediate requirements" necessary of the Government of Canada: appointing a Minister of Indian Affairs and recognizing and modernizing the Numbered Treaties.

1. First, the Red Paper calls the Canadian government to properly instate a Minister of Indian Affairs. This comes in part with Citizens Plus's rejection of abolishing the Indian Act, but rather acts as a contributing factor to amend the policy to better suit Indian needs. Citizens Plus requests this to set an example for better Indigenous cabinet representation in the Legislate of Canada. The Red Paper demands that this be a full time position, with adequate resources and capability to handle current responsibilities of Indian Affairs as well as to spearhead the suggested upcoming policy responsibilities associated with Indians and Indian Lands.
2. On the note of treaties, the Red Paper advocates for the "modernization of treaties", where it is reiterated that the spirit of treaty-making be taken with as much, if not more seriousness, than the policies of the White Paper written in foreign words. Being that it is the understanding that treaties and their promises are indefinite, Citizens Plus advocates for the Government of Canada to continue to maintain the promises and agreements outlined in that of the treaties. The Red Paper calls the Government of Canada to recognize the Numbered Treaties as binding and valid legal documents, demanding that the government has a responsibility to not only maintain such doctrines but also to "incorporate the treaties in updated terms in an amendment to the Canadian constitution."

Next, Citizens Plus advocates for better economic development for Indigenous Peoples, especially pertaining to the economic systems in place on reserves and Indian Land holdings. The Red Paper suggests the best way to advocate for proper economic development that would directly benefit Indigenous peoples has to do with the increased trust and implementation of local governments in the municipal tribal government system—where municipal law and politics are subject to be handled according to the system that best suits the tribe. The Red Paper rests this claim on the notion that local governments have been successful in the small-scale municipal realm and advocate for the Canadian government to place increased responsibility on these systems of governance as Citizens Plus states such local governments are ready for the challenge. Also, as a means of increasing economic development, the Red Paper advocates for increased government support to private industry. To make Indigenous communities the centre of increased economic prosperity and benefit, it is the Red Paper's suggestion that "The most effective way to encourage new enterprise in reserve communities is through tax incentives, training incentives, and labour guarantees." Because of the increase of private industry in these communities to create profitable work opportunities for the community, the Red Paper insists on federal assistance in private industry investment in these communities in order to make up the remaining high costs of investment for proper work opportunities. This economic development comes in part with the local effort of Indian peoples—as the paper states the main source of effort and sacrifice must come first from the individual and their tribe; however, the Red Paper advocates for a coalition of effort between these communities and the government, claiming that, "The objectives are group achievement, stability of family, and growth of community pride."

== After the Red Paper ==
The publication of the Red Paper, along with much criticism across Canada, resulted in the retraction of the White Paper by Pierre Trudeau. On June 3, 1970, leaders from the National Indian Brotherhood gathered in Ottawa to endorse the Red Paper as the official response to the Canadian government's White Paper. On June 4, the Indian Brotherhood met with the full cabinet in the Railway Committee Room in Parliament where they presented the two papers, Red and White, and symbolically rejected the White Paper by placing it on the table and handing the Red Paper to Pierre Trudeau. Trudeau acknowledged the White Paper as a failure and admitted "We had perhaps the prejudices of small "l" liberals and white men at that who thought that equality meant the same law for everybody." The White Paper was officially withdrawn in 1973 as marked by the Supreme Court Case Calder v British Columbia, in which Canadian law acknowledged that aboriginal title to land existed prior to the colonization of North America for the first time.
