= R v Ipeelee =

Supreme Court of Canada decision

- Supreme Court of Canada

Hearing: October 17, 2011 Judgment: March 23, 2012
- Citations: 2012 SCC 13, [2012] 1 SCR 433
- Docket No.: 33650

Court membership
- Chief Justice: Beverley McLachlin; Puisne Justices: Ian Binnie, Louis LeBel, Marie Deschamps, Morris Fish, Rosalie Abella, Marshall Rothstein, Thomas Cromwell

Reasons given
- Majority: LeBel (McLachlin, Binnie, Deschamps, Fish and Abella concurring)
- Dissent: Rothstein
- Cromwell took no part in the consideration or decision of the case.

Laws applied
- Criminal Code, RSC 1985, c C-46, s 718.2

R v Ipeelee is a Supreme Court of Canada decision which reaffirmed the court's previous holdings in R v Gladue, in that when sentencing an Indigenous person, every sentencing judge must consider: (a) the unique systemic or background factors which may have played a part in bringing the particular Indigenous individual before the courts; and (b) the types of sentencing procedures and sanctions which may be appropriate in the circumstances for the person before the court because of their particular Indigenous heritage or connection.

== Background ==
It has long been recognized that Indigenous Peoples are overrepresented in all points of the criminal justice system. The Royal Commission on Aboriginal Peoples found that the justice system in what is now known as Canada has failed Indigenous Peoples, both on and off-reserve, urban and rural, in all jurisdictions due to fundamentally different world views between Indigenous and non-Indigenous people with respect to issues such as substantive content of justice and process of achieving justice. The Supreme Court has recognized the unbalanced ratio of imprisonment for Indigenous Peoples results from a number of factors, including poverty, substance abuse, a lack of employment opportunities, a lack of access to education, and from bias against Indigenous Peoples. In order to address this overrepresentation, Parliament enacted section 718.2(e) of the Criminal Code.

The Supreme Court provided its first interpretation of this section in the decision of R v Gladue. R v Ipeelee, 2012, SCC 13 was a consolidation of two appeals (Mr. Ipeelee’s and Mr. Ladue’s) which affirmed and strengthened the Supreme Court’s direction in R v Gladue, in holding that all sentencing judges need to take specific consideration of the Aboriginal heritage of the person before the courts, and to consider all reasonable and available sentences, other than imprisonment. While the Supreme Court was clear with respect to sentencing judges being under a positive duty to consider the background circumstances of Indigenous Peoples before the courts, some have called into question the effectiveness of the current regime as directed by section 718.2(e) of the Criminal Code as Indigenous Peoples continued to be over-represented in the criminal justice system, despite the decision in Gladue being decided over twenty years ago.

== Principles of sentencing and section 718.2(e) of the Criminal Code ==
Section 718 of the Criminal Code outlines the fundamental purposes of sentencing. These fundamental purposes act to protect society and to contribute to, along with crime prevention initiatives, respect for the law and the maintenance of a just, peaceful and safe society by imposing just sanctions that have one of a combination of a codified list of sentencing objectives. These sentencing objectives include, but are not limited to, denunciation, deterrence, to separate offenders from society where necessary, and to assist in rehabilitating offenders. On September 3, 1996, the Criminal Code was amended to include section 718.2(e). Parliament enacted this remedial provision aimed at alleviating the over-incarceration rates of Indigenous offenders through sentencing. This section dictates a court must take into account all available sanctions, other than imprisonment, that are reasonable in the circumstances and consistent with the harm done to the victims or to the community should be considered for all offenders, with particular attention to the circumstances of Aboriginal offenders.

The Canadian legal system has always distinguished Indigenous Peoples from other Canadians on the basis of identity which flows from the definition of “Indian” outlined in the Indian Act. By directing the court’s attention to the circumstances of Indigenous offenders through the use of section 718.2(e), the Criminal Code acknowledges Indigenous Peoples unique position may be a result of their systemic disadvantage and postcolonial status. Section 718.2(e) requires a sentencing judge to adopt a different process when considering sentences for Indigenous offenders to achieve a truly fit and proper sentence for each individual before the court. While the sentencing process is individualized, the offender is understood to exist within the context of the collective experience of Indigenous Peoples in what is now called Canada. This includes recognition of “unique background and systemic factors which may have played a part in bringing the particular offender before the courts.” These changes to section 718.2 recognized that crimes could not be separated from the effects of residential schools and damage done to Indigenous Peoples, which lead to a dramatic over-representation in prison populations.

== R v Gladue, [1999] 1 SCR 688 ==
R v Gladue was a landmark decision of the Supreme Court of Canada which represented the court’s first opportunity to interpret section 718.2(e) of the Criminal Code. This decision focused on the overrepresentation of Indigenous Peoples in jails and held this overrepresentation was “a crisis in the Canadian criminal justice system.” Importantly, this was not a result of Indigenous Peoples committing crime at disproportionate rates, rather the criminal justice system disproportionately incarcerating Indigenous Peoples. The Court went on to clarify that when sentencing an Indigenous person, a sentencing judge requires information in two distinct areas. First, the unique or systemic background factors which may have played a role in bringing that particular person before the court. Second, the types of sentencing procedures and sanctions which may be appropriate in the circumstances for the person before the court because of their particular aboriginal heritage or connection.

== R v Ipeelee, 2012 SCC 13 ==
The individual at the heart of this matter was Mr. Manasie Ipeelee, an Inuk man born and raised in Iqaluit, Nunavut. The court noted his mother was an alcoholic who froze to death when Mr. Ipeelee was only five years old, and he was subsequently raised by his maternal grandparents. He began consuming alcohol around the age of eleven, after which he developed a serious alcohol addiction which resulted in involvement in the criminal justice system at only twelve years old. His youth record contained approximately three dozen convictions, the majority being property-related offences, failures to comply with court orders, breaches of probation orders, and being unlawfully at large.

At 39 years old, Mr. Ipeelee had a history of abusing alcohol and committing violent offences when intoxicated. Accordingly, his adult record contained a further 24 convictions, again for mostly property-related offences. His record also included two counts of assault causing bodily harm and these convictions provided the basis for his designation as a long-term offender.

== Procedural history ==
=== Ontario Court of Justice, R v Ipeelee, 2009 OJ No 6413 ===
Justice Megginson of the Ontario Court of Justice sentenced Mr. Ipeelee to three years imprisonment, less six months of pre-sentence custody (or time spend incarcerated while he was awaiting trial), emphasizing the serious nature of the offence. In his sentencing decision, Justice Megginson held that when the protection of the public is of paramount concern, as it is when sentencing for a breach of a Long-Term Supervision Order, an offender’s Indigenous status is of “diminished importance.” Mr. Ipeelee appealed this sentence on the grounds it was demonstrably unfit, and that Justice Megginson did not give appropriate consideration to his circumstances as an Indigenous man.

=== Ontario Court of Appeal, R v Ipeelee, 2009 ONCA 892 ===
The majority of the Ontario Court of Appeal found Mr. Ipeelee’s sentence was not demonstrably unfit, and despite the sentencing judge’s comments, Mr. Ipeelee’s Indigenous status had not factored into the sentencing decision. The Court of Appeal concluded these considerations should not affect the sentence he ultimately received.

=== Supreme Court of Canada ===
The Supreme Court of Canada further strengthened the ruling of R v Gladue when it released its decision on R v Ipeelee. The majority decision of the Supreme Court of Canada was written by Justice Louis LeBel, who allowed Mr. Ipeelee’s appeal and reiterated the highest court’s insistence that sentencing judges are under a positive duty to take all of the circumstances of Indigenous offenders into account when imposing any sentence. Justice LeBel noted the Gladue decision and section 718.2(e) of the Criminal Code has not had the anticipated impact, specifically with respect to the rates of over-incarceration of Indigenous People. Instead, the situation has worsened.

R v Ipeelee reaffirmed a sentencing judge’s statutory duty to take into account an Aboriginal offender’s circumstances, no matter what offence was committed. Importantly, the court held:

“The sentencing judge has a statutory duty, imposed by section 718.2(e) of the Criminal Code, to consider the unique circumstances of Aboriginal offenders. Failure to apply Gladue in any case involving an Aboriginal offender runs afoul of this statutory obligation.”

The two issues before the Supreme Court of Canada were as follows:

1. What are the principles governing the sentencing of Aboriginal offenders, including the proper interpretation and application of the decision in R v Gladue, and the application of those principles to the breach of Mr. Ipeelee’s Long-Term Supervision Order? and

2. Given the principles of sentencing, was Mr. Ipeelee’s sentence an error in principle or did it impose an unfit sentence that warrants appellant intervention?

==== Issue 1 – Principles of Sentencing ====
The majority of the Supreme Court of Canada reiterates the two-pronged analysis as previously directed in R v Gladue: the court must consider the unique systemic and background factors which might have played a role in bringing the Indigenous person before the court, and the types of sanctions which may be appropriate in the circumstances due to their particular Indigenous heritage or connection.

Importantly, Justice LeBel finds the consideration of the background and systemic factors as directed in the first prong of a Gladue analysis forms an inherent part of the proportionality principle (meaning sentences must be comparable to both the gravity of the offence and the responsibility of the offender). To this end, systemic factors may weigh on the culpability of the offender to the extent these factors may shed light on their level of moral blameworthiness.

Justice LeBel holds the second prong of the Gladue analysis does more than simply affirm the existing principles of sentencing as being inappropriate for most Indigenous offenders because they have not historically responded appropriately to the unique experiences and/or perspectives of Indigenous Peoples or communities. The distinction of communities was important. The majority held that “Gladue principles direct sentencing judges to abandon the presumption that all offenders and all communities share the same values when it comes to sentencing and to recognize that, given these fundamentally different world views, different or alternative solutions may more effectively achieve the objectives of sentencing in a particular community.”

==== Issue 2 – Sentencing Error ====
The majority of the Supreme Court of Canada found the courts below made several errors, including the conclusion that protection of the public is the paramount objective when sentencing an individual for the breach of a long-term supervision order. A further error was committed when the court considered that rehabilitation only plays a small role. However, the legislative purpose of a long-term supervision order is to rehabilitate offenders and assist them to reintegrate back into society. As a result, the lower courts did not give proper attention to Mr. Ipeelee’s background factors as an Indigenous person, especially considering the Court of Appeal’s finding that the features of sentencing an Indigenous person will play little to no role when sentencing long-term offenders. The Supreme Court found this to be in error.

Ultimately, the Supreme Court granted Mr. Ipeelee’s appeal, and substituted a sentence of one year’s imprisonment, with an order to abstain from alcohol use while under the long-term supervision order.

== Effectiveness ==
While the Supreme Court of Canada was unequivocal in demanding there be a requirement for sentencing judges to take into account the unique circumstances of Indigenous persons before the court, there are some who have posited section 718.2(e) has not been as effective as originally considered. Scholars who have analyzed trial and appellate decisions made subsequent to the Ipeelee decision (between March 23, 2012 and October 1, 2015) have noted the very limited impact of the proposed approach in sentencing Indigenous offenders and have argued this continues to be resounding failure despite a few isolated acts of judicial courage.

Finally, there have been calls by some to extend the use of Gladue principles beyond the Canadian sentencing regime, and it is unclear to what extent the Gladue (and subsequent Ipeelee) decisions could be extended to other areas involving the treatment of Indigenous offenders by the justice system. Martin has argued Gladue principles should be extended into areas such disciplinary hearings of lawyers.
