= Index of articles related to Indigenous Canadians =

The following is an alphabetical list of topics related to Indigenous peoples in Canada, comprising the First Nations, Inuit and Métis peoples.

== 0–9 ==
- 1969 White Paper
- 1981 Restigouche raid

== A ==
- Aatsista-Mahkan (Running rabbit)
- Abenaki mythology
- Aboriginal Curatorial Collective
- Aboriginal Day of Action
- Aboriginal land claim
- Aboriginal Multimedia Society of Alberta
- Aboriginal Nurses Association of Canada
- Aboriginal Peoples Television Network
- Aboriginal People's Party
- Aboriginal Peoples Party of Canada
- Aboriginal police in Canada
- Aboriginal title
- Aboriginal Voices
- Aboriginal whaling
- Agreement Respecting a New Relationship Between the Cree Nation and the Government of Quebec
- Aleutian tradition
- Allied Tribes of British Columbia
- Amauti – Inuit parka
- Angakkuq
- Anglo-Métis
- Anishinaabe traditional beliefs
- Anishinaabe tribal political organizations
- Archaic period in the Americas
- Arctic Council
- Arctic small tool tradition
- Assembly of First Nations leadership conventions
- Athabaskan languages
- Attorney General of Canada v. Lavell
- Azeban

== B ==
- Band-operated schools
- Band society
- Battle of Cut Knife
- Battle of Duck Lake
- Battle of Cut Knife
- Battle of Fallen Timbers
- Battle of Fish Creek
- Battle of Fort Pitt
- Battle of Frenchman's Butte
- Battle of Hudson's Bay
- Battle of Loon Lake
- Battle of Long Sault
- Battle of the Belly River
- Battle of Seven Oaks (1816)
- Bannock (food)
- Beaver Wars
- Bell of Batoche
- Beothuk
- Bibliography of Canada
- Big Bear (mistahi-maskwa)
- Birnirk culture
- Blackfoot language
- Blackfoot music
- Blackfoot religion
- Blond Eskimos
- Bloody Falls Massacre
- Bridge River Rapids
- 2002 British Columbia aboriginal treaty referendum
- British Columbia Treaty Process
- British North America Acts
- Brocket 99
- Burnt Church Crisis
- Bungee language

== C ==
- Calder v. British Columbia (Attorney General)
- Canada
- Classification of indigenous peoples of the Americas
- Canadian Aboriginal law
- Canadian Aboriginal syllabics
- Canadian House of Commons Standing Committee on Aboriginal Affairs and Northern Development
- Canadian Indian residential school system
- Canadian Polar Commission
- Canadian Senate Standing Committee on Aboriginal Peoples
- Caribou Inuit
- Centre for Indigenous Theatre
- Center for World Indigenous Studies
- Chief Pontiac (Obwandiyag)
- Chimney Rock (Canada)
- Chippewas of Sarnia Band v. Canada (Attorney General)
- Christ Church Royal Chapel
- CHRS-FM
- Classification of indigenous peoples of the Americas
  - Indigenous languages of the Americas
    - Arctic cultural area – (Eskimo–Aleut languages)
    - Subarctic culture area – (Na-Dene languages – Algic languages)
    - Eastern Woodlands (Northeast) cultural area – (Algic languages and Iroquoian languages)
    - Plains cultural area – (Siouan–Catawban languages)
    - Northwest Plateau cultural area – (Salishan languages)
    - Northwest Coast cultural area – (Penutian languages, Tsimshianic languages and Wakashan languages)
- Coast Salish peoples
- Coast Salish art
- Coast Salish languages
- Coast Tsimshian
- Congress of Aboriginal Peoples
- Constitution Act, 1982
- Council of Three Fires
- Section Thirty-five of the Constitution Act, 1982
- Section Twenty-five of the Canadian Charter of Rights and Freedoms
- Copper Inuit
- Corbiere v. Canada (Minister of Indian and Northern Affairs)
- Cree syllabics
- Crowfoot (Isapo-Muxika)
- Culture of the Tlingit

== D ==
- Daniels v. Canada
- De-ba-jeh-mu-jig Theatre Group
- Declaration of the Lillooet Tribe
- Declaration on the Rights of Indigenous Peoples
- Definitions and identity of indigenous peoples
- Delgamuukw v. British Columbia
- Disc number
- Dorset culture
- Douglas Treaties
- Dreamcatcher
- The Dead Dog Café Comedy Hour

== E ==
- Eastern Woodlands tribes
- Egushawa
- Enumclaw and Kapoonis
- Eskimo
- Eskimo–Aleut languages
- Eskimo kissing
- European colonization of the Americas

French colonization of the Americas
British colonisation of the Americas

- Eva Aariak
- Exovedate

== F ==
- Federal Interlocutor for Métis and Non-Status Indians
- Federation of Saskatchewan Indian Nations
- First Nation-municipal service agreement
- First Nations in Canada (a main article)
  First Nations Bank of Canada
  First Nations Composer Initiative
  First Nations Government (Canada)
  First Nations Health Authority
  First Nations Periodicals
  First Nations Police (Ontario)
  First Nations Summit
  First Nations Technical Institute
  First Nations Transportation
  First Nations University Students' Association
  First Nations University of Canada
  First Nations in Alberta
  First Nations in Atlantic Canada
  First Nations in British Columbia
  First Nations in Manitoba
  First Nations in New Brunswick
  First Nations in Ontario
  First Nations in Quebec
  First Nations in Saskatchewan
  First Nations language
  First Nations music
  First Nations social issues
  First Nations studies
- First Peoples' Heritage, Language and Culture Council
- First Battle of Bloody Creek
- Five Medals
- Folsom point
- Folsom tradition
- Franco-Indian alliance
- Fraser Canyon War
- French and Indian War
  Battle of Fort Beauséjour (June 16, 1755)
  Siege of Louisbourg (June 8 – July 26, 1758)
  Battle of Fort Frontenac (August 25, 1758)
  Battle of the Thousand Islands, August 16–25, 1760
  Battle of Beauport (July 31, 1759)
  Battle of the Plains of Abraham (September 13, 1759)
  Battle of Sainte-Foy (April 28, 1760)
  Battle of Restigouche, July 3–8, 1760
  Battle of Signal Hill September 15, 1762
- Food of the Tlingit
- Frog Lake Massacre
- Fort Defiance (British Columbia)
- Fort Fraser, British Columbia
- Fort Garry
- Fort Saint Vrain
- Fort Simpson (Columbia Department)
- Fort St. James, British Columbia
- Fort Stikine
- Fort Vancouver
- Fort Vancouver National Historic Site
- Fort Vasquez
- Fort Ware, British Columbia
- The Fur Trade at Lachine National Historic Site
- Fur brigade
- Fred Quilt inquiry
- Fur seal

== G ==
- Genetic history of indigenous peoples of the Americas
- Gabriel Dumont
- Gabriel Dumont Institute
- Genetic history of indigenous peoples of the Americas
  - Y-DNA haplogroups in Indigenous peoples of the Americas
- Gradual Civilization Act
- Grand Council of Treaty 3
- Grand River land dispute
- Great Peace of Montreal
- Great Spirit
- Gitche Manitou
- Gitksan language
- Gitxsan Treaty Society
- Glooscap
- Gustafsen Lake Standoff

== H ==
- Haplogroup C-M217 (Y-DNA)
- Haplogroup Q-M242 (Y-DNA)
  - Haplogroup Q-NWT01 (Y-DNA)
  - Haplogroup Q-P89.1 (Y-DNA)
  - Haplogroup Q-M3 (Y-DNA)
- Haplogroup R1 (Y-DNA)
- Haldimand Proclamation
- Hamatla Treaty Society
- Haida Argillite Carvings
- Haida language
- Haida manga
- Haida mythology
- Haisla language
- Head-Smashed-In Buffalo Jump
- Heiltsuk language
- Hereditary chiefs in Canada
- High Arctic relocation
- History of Canada
- History of Alberta#Pre-Confederation
- History of the west coast of North America
- History of Squamish and Tsleil-Waututh Longshoremen, 1863–1963
- Hivernants
- Hopewell tradition
- Hudson's Bay Company
- Hul'qumi'num Treaty Group

== I ==
- Igloo
- Ihalmiut
- Indian Act
- Indian Agent (Canada)
- Indian Department
- Indian Health Transfer Policy (Canada)
- Indigenous peoples of the Pacific Northwest Coast
- Indians of Canada Pavilion
- Indian Posse
- Indian Register
- Indian Residential Schools Truth and Reconciliation Commission
- Indian Reserve (1763)
- Indian settlement
- Indian and Northern Affairs Canada
- Indigenous archaeology
- Indigenous Canadian personalities
- Indigenous Dialogues
- Indigenous (ecology)
- Indigenous food security in Canada
- Indigenous intellectual property
- Indigenous knowledge
- Indigenous land claims in Canada
- Indigenous language
- Indigenous languages of the Americas
- Indigenous medicine
- Indigenous music of Canada
- Indigenous peoples by geographic regions
- Indigenous peoples in Northern Canada
- Indigenous peoples in Quebec
- Indigenous peoples of the Americas
- Indigenous peoples of the Pacific Northwest Coast
- Indigenous rights
- Indspire
- Indspire Awards
- International Work Group for Indigenous Affairs
- Institute of Indigenous Government
- Inu-Yupiaq
- Inuit
  Inuit–Aleut
  Inuit art
  Museum of Inuit Art
  Inuit astronomy
  Inuit Boots
  Inuit Broadcasting Corporation
  Inuit Circumpolar Council
  Inuit Circumpolar Conference
  Inuit culture
  Inuit diet
  Inuit Dog
  Inuit grammar
  Inuit language
  Inuit mask
  Inuit music
  Inuit mythology
  Inuit numerals
  Inuit phonology
  Inuit Qaujimajatuqangit
  Inuit snow goggles
  Inuit syllabary
  Inuit Tapiriit Kanatami
  Inuit throat singing
  Inuit weapons
- Inuinnaqtun
- Inuktitut
- Inuktitut writing
- Inuktitut syllabics
- Inuvialuktun
- Inuvialuit Settlement Region
- Inukshuk
- Inuktitut (magazine)
- Isuma
- Iroquois
- Iroquois kinship
- Iroquois mythology
- Ipperwash Crisis
- Ipperwash Inquiry

== J ==
- James Bay and Northern Quebec Agreement
- James Bay Cree hydroelectric conflict
- Jenu
- Jesuit missions in North America
- Jordan's principle
- Journal of Aboriginal Health
- Journal of Indigenous Studies
- Juno Award for Aboriginal Recording of the Year

== K ==
- Kabloona
- Kahnawake Gaming Commission
- Kahnawake Iroquois and the Rebellions of 1837–38
- Kainai
- Kamloops Wawa
- Kayak
- Kwak'wala
- Kwakwaka'wakw mythology
- Kwakwaka'wakw art
- Kwakwaka'wakw music
- Kegedonce Press
- Koyukons
- King George's War
- King William's War
- Kwäday Dän Ts’ìnchi
- Kwakwaka'wakw
- Kwakwaka'wakw art
- Kruger and al. v. The Queen
- Kudlik

== L ==
- Lacrosse
- Lachine massacre
- Land ownership in Canada
- Laurel complex
- List of archaeological periods (North America)
  Lithic stage (pre 8000 BC)
  Archaic stage (c. 8000 – 1000 BC)
  Formative stage (c. 1000 BC – AD 500)
  Classic stage (c. AD 500–1200)
  Post-Classic stage (c. 1200–1900)
- List of bibliographical materials on the potlatch
- List of Canadians
- List of Canadians § Aboriginal leaders
  Big Bear (1825–1888) – Cree leader
  Brant, Joseph (1742–1807) – Mohawk leader
  Brant, Mary (1736–1796) – leader of Six Nations women's federation
  Riel, Louis (1844–1885) – leader of two Métis uprisings
  Piapot (c. 1816–1908) – Cree Chief
  Tecumseh (1768–1813) – Shawnee leader
  Nicola 1780/1785 – c. 1865 – Grand chief of the Okanagan people, and jointly chief of the Nlaka'pamux
  Nicola Athapaskan alliance in the Nicola Valley and of the Kamloops group of the Secwepemc
  Cumshewa – 18th-century Haida chief at the inlet now bearing his name
  Maquinna – 18th-century Nuu-chah-nulth chief (Yuquot/Mowachaht).
  Wickanninish 19th-century Nuu-chah-nulth chief (Opitsaht/Tla-o-qui-aht)
  August Jack Khatsahlano – Squamish
  Joe Capilano – Squamish
  Harriet Nahanee – Squamish and Nuu-chah-nulth (Pacheedaht)
  Andy Paull – Squamish
  Frank Calder (politician) – Nisga'a
  Elijah Harper – Cree and/or Ojibwe
  Guujaaw – modern-day Haida leader
  Shawn Atleo
  William Beynon
  Rose Charlie
  Arthur Wellington Clah
  Heber Clifton
  Harley Desjarlais
  Alfred Dudoward
  Chief Shakes
  Dan George – Tsleil-Waututh First Nation (Burrard)
  Joseph Gosnell – Nisga'a
  Simon Gunanoot – Gitxsan
  Chief Hunter Jack ( –d.1905) – St'at'imc
  Mary John, Sr.
  Klattasine – Tsilhqot'in war chief, surrendered on terms of amnesty in times of war, hanged for murder
  Koyah – 18th-century chief of the Haida
  George Manuel
  Shanawdithit
  Stewart Phillip
  Steven Point – modern Sto:lo leader, Lieutenant-Governor of British Columbia 2007–12
  James Sewid – Kwakwaka'wakw
  Alec Thomas
  Walter Wright
- List of Chinook Jargon placenames
- List of community radio stations in Canada
- List of English words from indigenous languages of the Americas
- List of First Nations governments
- List of First Nations people
- List of First Nations peoples
- List of Indian reserves in Canada
- List of Indian reserves in Canada by population
- List of Indian residential schools in Canada
- List of indigenous peoples
- List of Canadian Inuit
- List of Métis people
- List of place names in Canada of Aboriginal origin
- List of placenames of indigenous origin in the Americas
- List of pre-Columbian cultures
- List of tribal councils in British Columbia
- List of writers from peoples indigenous to the Americas
- Looting of Battleford
- Louis Riel
- Trial of Louis Riel
- Louis Riel: A Comic-Strip Biography

== M ==
- Makah language
- Malsumis
- Manitoba Band Operated Schools
- Manitou
- Maritime Archaic
- McKenna-McBride Royal Commission
- McNally Robinson Aboriginal Book of the Year Award
- Mica Bay incident
- Michif language
- Minister of Aboriginal and Northern Affairs (Manitoba)
- Minister of Indian Affairs and Northern Development (Canada)
- Missing and murdered Indigenous women
- Mitchell v. M.N.R.
- Models of migration to the New World
- Mokotakan
- Meech Lake Accord
- Métis people (Canada)
  Anglo-Métis
  Métis Flag
  Métis French
  Metis Comprehensive Land Claim Agreement
  Métis National Council
  Métis Nation of Alberta
  Métis in Alberta
  Métis Nation British Columbia
  Métis Community Association of Vancouver
  Manitoba Métis Federation
  Métis Nation - Saskatchewan
  Métis Nation of Ontario
  Métis Population Betterment Act
  Métis-sur-Mer, Quebec
  Métis people (United States)
- Mixed-blood
- Mohawk language
- Mukluk
- Music of Nunavut

== N ==
- Na-Dene languages
- Nanfan Treaty
- Nahnebahwequa
- Nanook
- Nanook of the North
- National Aboriginal Day
- National Aboriginal Health Organization
- Native American cuisine
- Native American art
- Native Education Centre
- Native Friendship Centre
- Native Women's Association of Canada
- Nellie Cournoyea
- New World
- Nicola (chief)
- Nicola language
- Nicole Redhead
- Nine Years' War
- Nisga'a Final Agreement
- Nisga'a language
- North American fur trade
- Northwest Coast art
- Northwest Indian War
- Northern Regional Negotiations Table
- North West Company – North West fur Company (1779 to 1821)
- North-West Rebellion
- Norton tradition
- Numbered Treaties
  Treaty 1 – August 1871
  Treaty 2 – August 1871
  Treaty 3 – October 1873
  Treaty 4 – September 1874
  Treaty 5 – September 1875 (adhesions from 1908 to 1910)
  Treaty 6 – August–September 1876 (adhesions in February 1889)
  Treaty 7 – September 1877
  Treaty 8 – June 1899 (with further signings and adhesions until 1901)
  Treaty 9 – July 1905
  Treaty 10 – August 1906
  Treaty 11 – June 1921
- Nunamiut
- Nunatsiavummiutut
- Nunavut Arctic College
- Nunavut Land Claims Agreement
- Nuu-chah-nulth
- Nuu-chah-nulth mythology
- Nuxálk language

== O ==
- Ogemawahj Tribal Council
- Ojibwe writing systems
- Oowekyala language
- Oka Crisis
- Okichitaw
- Old Copper complex
- Old Crow Flats
- One Dead Indian
- Onkweonwe
- Ontario Minamata disease
- Ozette Indian Village Archeological Site

== P ==
- Paleo-Eskimo
- Paleo-Indians
- Payipwat (Piapot)
- Paulette Caveat
- Petun
- Penetanguishene Bay Purchase
- Poundmaker (Pitikwahanapiwiyin)
  Poundmaker Cree Nation
- Plano culture
- Plank house
- Plastic shaman
- Pittailiniit
- Plains Indians
- Point Peninsula complex
- Police
- Population history of American indigenous peoples
- Potlatch
- Pontiac's Rebellion
- Pow-wow
- Powley ruling
- Pierre de Troyes, Chevalier de Troyes
- Prince Albert Volunteers
- Pre-Columbian
- Public consultation
- Pwi-Di-Goo-Zing Ne-Yaa-Zhing Advisory Services

== Q ==
- Qiviut
- Queen Anne's War

== R ==
- R. v. Badger
- R. v. Marshall; R. v. Bernard
- R. v. Marshall
- R. v. Drybones
- R. v. Gladstone
- R. v. Gonzales
- R. v. Guerin
- R. v. Sparrow
- R. v. Van der Peet
- Rancherie
- Re Eskimos
- Red Paint People
- Red River Rebellion
- Red River ox cart
- Royal Commission on Aboriginal Peoples
- Royal Proclamation of 1763
- Rupert's Land
  Rupert's Land Act 1868

== S ==
- St. Catherines Milling v. The Queen
- St. Jude's Cathedral (Iqaluit)
- St. Lawrence Iroquoians
- Sacred bundle
- Salishan languages
- Saskatchewan Indian Institute of Technologies
- Saugeen complex
- Saugeen Tract Agreement
- Section Thirty-five of the Constitution Act, 1982
- Section Twenty-five of the Canadian Charter of Rights and Freedoms
- Status of First Nations treaties in British Columbia
- Secwepemc Cultural Education Society
- Secwepemc Museum and Heritage Park
- Settler Colonialism in Canada
- Seven Nations of Canada
- Shamanism among Eskimo peoples
- Shingwauk Kinoomaage Gamig
- Siqqitiq
- Sisiutl
- Sixty Years' War (1754–1814)
  French and Indian War (1754–1763)
  Pontiac's Rebellion (1763–1765)
  Lord Dunmore's War (1774)
  Frontier warfare during the American Revolution (1775–1783)
  Northwest Indian War (1786–1794)
  War of 1812 (1812–1814)
- Skaay
- Sk'elep
- Skookum
- Squamish people
- Squamish culture
- Squamish history
- Squamish language
- Sled dog
- Spoken languages of Canada § Indigenous languages
- Squaw
- St'at'imcets language
- Status of First Nations treaties in British Columbia
- Stereotypes of Native Americans
- Stó:lō
- Slahal
- Soulcatcher
- Spirit of Haida Gwaii
- Sun Dance

== T ==
- The Canadian Crown and Aboriginal peoples (Main political article)
- Teiaiagon
- Terres en vues/Land InSights
- The Great Peacemaker
- Three Sisters (agriculture)
- Thunderbird Park (Victoria, British Columbia)
- Thule people
- Tlingit language
- Toggling harpoon
- Totem pole
- Travois
- Treaty of 1818
- Treaty of Fort Niagara
- Treaty of Hartford (1638)
- Tribal College Librarians Institute
- Tikigaq
- Treaty of Fort Niagara
- Tribal council (Canada)
- Tsimshian mythology
- Tunngavik Federation of Nunavut
- Two-Spirit

== U ==
- Ulu
- Urban Indian reserve
- Umiak
- Unceded territory
- Union of Ontario Indians
- Uu-a-thluk

== V ==
- Vancouver Métis Community Association

== W ==
- Waabnoong Bemjiwang Association of First Nations
- Wabbicommicot
- Wampum
- Wakashan languages
- Wawatay Native Communications Society
- War of 1812
  Chronology of the War of 1812
  War of 1812 Campaigns
  Niagara campaign
  Results of the War of 1812
  Tecumseh
  Tecumseh's War
- War canoe
- Western Confederacy
- Wiigwaasabak
- Winalagalis Treaty Group
- Windigo First Nations Council
- Wolseley Expedition
- World Council of Indigenous Peoples
- Working Group on Indigenous Populations
- Wyandot religion

== X ==
- X̱á:ytem

== Y ==
- Yellowquill College
- Yupik languages
- Yukon River Inter-Tribal Watershed Council

== Search ==
Search all pages with prefix

- All pages beginning with "Aboriginal"
- All pages beginning with "First Nations"
- All pages beginning with "Inuit"
- All pages beginning with "Métis"

Search all pages with title

== See also ==
- Outline of Canada
- Bibliography of Canada
- List of Canada-related topics by provinces and territories (Clickable maps)
