= VMCA =

VMCA is an abbreviation for

- V_{mc_{a}} (Minimum control speed in the take-off configuration, a.k.a. air minimum control speed or minimum control speed in free air) see V speeds. The term and symbol are officially approved by the International Civil Aviation Organization (ICAO) and come from the French « vitesse minimale de contrôle en air libre ».
- Vancouver Métis Community Association
- Veterinary Medical College Application Service
- Veterans for Medical Cannabis Access
- Voluntary Marine Conservation Area
