= Nicola Valley Institute of Technology =

Aboriginal college in British Columbia, Canada

- Motto: Sharing Knowledge - Preparing Leaders
- Type: Public
- Established: 1983
- Academic affiliations: CICan, CCAA
- Chairperson: Lennard Joe
- President: John Chenoweth
- Students: 670 (2024-25 FTE)
- Location: Merritt, British Columbia, Burnaby, British Columbia
- Campus: Multiple sites
- Colours: Red & green
- Website: nvit.ca

Nicola Valley Institute of Technology (NVIT) is the only public Indigenous post-secondary institution in the Canadian province of British Columbia, Canada. It started in 1983. As B.C.’s only Indigenous-led public post-secondary institution — founded by the five First Nations of the Nicola Valley and fully governed by a First Nations board of governors — NVIT has a mandate to provide post-secondary education and support services to Indigenous students across British Columbia.

== History ==
NVIT is British Columbia's Aboriginal public post-secondary institute. NVIT was formed as a private institute in 1983 by the First Nations bands of Coldwater, Nooaitch, Shackan, Upper Nicola and Lower Nicola. NVIT was designated as a Provincial Institute under the British Columbia College and Institute Act in 1995. NVIT spent years in the downtown core of Merritt, British Columbia. The Eagles Perch campus opened in 2002.

NVIT is a member of the Indigenous Adult and Higher Learning Association (IAHLA), which was created in 2003 to represent and work on behalf of Aboriginal controlled adult and post-secondary education institutes in British Columbia.

Due to its work with Northern BC First Nations, including the Wit'suwit'in, Nisga'a, and Lake Babine First Nation, has explored a Northern campus. In 2019 the province of BC provided $2.7 million for Indigenous teacher education. In 2022 NVIT received $3.4 million in funding for mobile training units devoted to healthcare and Information Technology education.

Ernie Gran left NVIT in September 2023. CEO Ken Tourand was terminated August 14, 2024.

== Campus ==
=== Merritt ===
The Merritt Campus is at 4155 Belshaw Street Merritt, British Columbia V1K 1R1. Housing on the campus is set to increase to 110 units by 2027.

=== Vancouver ===
The Vancouver campus is at 200-4355 Mathissi Place, Burnaby, British Columbia V5G 4S8. In 2022 BC announced $2.5 million in funding for a new Vancouver campus.

== Cybersecurity ==
A ransomware cybersecurity incident in December 2019 wiped out most of NVIT's technology systems.

== Programs ==
NVIT programs and courses are accredited within the province of British Columbia.

- Aboriginal Community and Health Development
- Aboriginal Community Economic Development
- Aboriginal Early Childhood Education (Merritt only)
- Academic and Indigenous Studies (University Transfer)
- Access to Practical Nursing
- Administrative Studies (Merritt only)
- Bridging to Trades
- College Readiness (Merritt and Vancouver Campus)
- Community Education
- Information Technology
- Health Care Assistant
- Law Enforcement Preparatory Program (Merritt only)
- Natural Resource Technology (Merritt only)
- Social Work

== See also ==
- List of institutes and colleges in British Columbia
- List of universities in British Columbia
- Higher education in British Columbia
- Education in Canada
- Institute of Indigenous Government
