= Crown–Indigenous Relations and Northern Affairs Canada =

Government department

- Relations Couronne-Autochtones et des Affaires du Nord Canada

Department overview
- Formed: 2019; 1880 (historic)
- Jurisdiction: Canada
- Headquarters: Gatineau, Quebec, Canada
- Employees: 4500+
- Ministers responsible: Rebecca Alty, Minister of Crown–Indigenous Relations; Rebecca Chartrand, Minister of Northern and Arctic Affairs
- Deputy Minister responsible: Valerie Gideon, Deputy Minister of Crown-Indigenous Relations
- Website: www.rcaanc-cirnac.gc.ca

Crown–Indigenous Relations and Northern Affairs Canada (CIRNAC; French: Relations Couronne-Autochtones et des Affaires du Nord Canada) (Note: Crown–Indigenous Relations and Northern Affairs Canada is the applied title under the Federal Identity Program; the legal title is the Department of Crown–Indigenous Relations and Northern Affairs (French: Ministère des Relations Couronne-Autochtones et des Affaires du Nord).) is the department of the Government of Canada responsible for Canada's northern lands and territories, and one of two departments with responsibility for policies relating to Indigenous peoples in Canada (the other being the Department of Indigenous Services, or ISC).

CIRNAC, along with ISC, were established to replace the Department of Indian Affairs and Northern Development (DIAND).

The department is overseen by two cabinet ministers, the Minister of Crown–Indigenous relations (whose portfolio includes treaty rights and land negotiations) and the Minister of Northern Affairs. Its headquarters is in Terrasses de la Chaudière, in downtown Gatineau, Quebec.

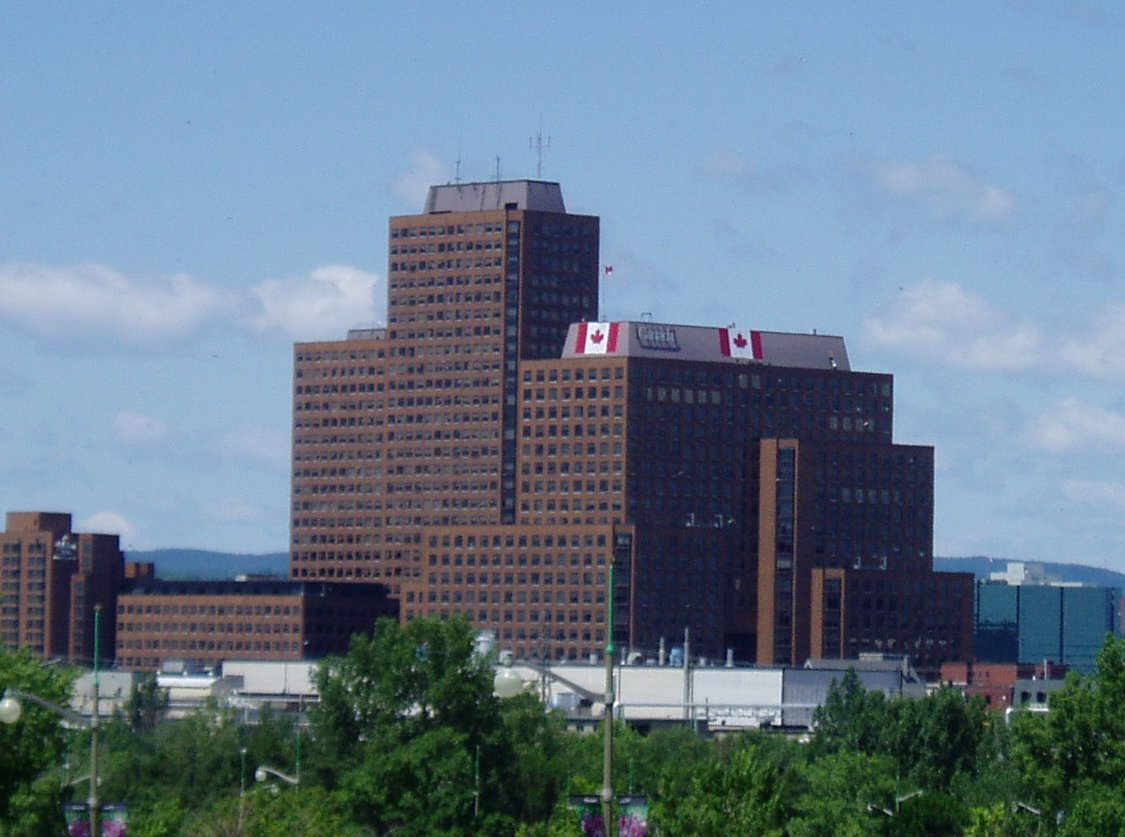
Terrasses de la Chaudière houses the departmental headquarters in Gatineau, Quebec.

== Nomenclature ==
"First Nation" has been used since the 1970s instead of the word Indian, which some people found offensive.

The term Indian is used for legal and historical documents such as Status Indians as defined by the Indian Act. For example, the term "Indian" continues to be used in the historical and legal document, the Canadian Constitution and federal statutes. The then-Aboriginal Affairs and Northern Development Canada used the term Inuit in referring to "an Aboriginal people in Northern Canada, who live in Nunavut, Northwest Territories, Northern Quebec and Northern Labrador. The word means 'people' in the Inuit language — Inuktitut. The singular of Inuit is Inuk."

Eskimo is found in historical documents about Canadian Inuit. The term Aboriginal is commonly used when referring to the three groups of indigenous peoples (First Nations, Inuit, and Métis) as a whole. It is also used by Aboriginal people who live within Canada who claim rights of sovereignty or Aboriginal title to lands.

== Departmental mandate ==
CIRNAC is one of the federal government departments responsible for meeting the Government of Canada's obligations and commitments to First Nations, Inuit and Métis, and for fulfilling the federal government's constitutional responsibilities in the North. The department's responsibilities are largely determined by numerous statutes, negotiated agreements and relevant legal decisions. Most of the department's programs, representing a majority of its spending - are delivered through partnerships with Aboriginal communities and federal-provincial or federal-territorial agreements. CIRNAC also works with urban Indigenous people, Métis and Non-Status Indians (many of whom live in rural areas).

CIRNAC supports indigenous peoples (First Nations, Inuit and Métis) and Northerners in their efforts to:

- improve social well-being and economic prosperity;
- develop healthier, more sustainable communities; and
- participate more fully in Canada's political, social and economic development to the benefit of all Canadians.

CIRNAC also works with urban First Nations, Métis and Non-Status Indians (many of whom live in rural areas) through the Office of the Federal Interlocutor. CIRNAC also manages the resources of federal lands, including land and subsurface leases and resource royalties.

== History ==
=== Aboriginal Affairs ===
In 1755, the British Crown established the Indian Department. The Governor General of Canada held control of Indian affairs, but usually delegated much of their responsibility to subordinate civil secretaries. In 1860, the responsibility for Indian affairs was transferred from the British government to the Province of Canada; the responsibility for Indian affairs was then delegated to the Crown Lands Department Commissions Responsible for Indian Affairs.

The federal government's legislative responsibilities for First Nations and the Inuit derive from section 91(24) of the Constitution Act, 1867 and responsibility was given to the Secretary of State for the Provinces Responsible for Indian Affairs. In 1876, the Indian Act, which remains the major expression of federal jurisdiction in this area, was passed and a series of treaties were concluded between Canada and the various Indian bands across the country.

The responsibility for Indian Affairs and Northern Development rested with various government departments between 1873 and 1966. The Minister of the Interior also held the position of Superintendent-General of Indian Affairs after the Indian Affairs Department was established in 1880. In 1939, federal jurisdiction for Indian peoples was interpreted by the courts to apply to the Inuit. A revised Indian Act was passed in 1951.

From 1950 to 1965, the Indian Affairs portfolio was carried by the Minister of Citizenship and Immigration. On October 1, 1966, the Department of Indian Affairs and Northern Development was created as a result of the Government Organization Act, 1966. Effective June 13, 2011, the department began using the applied title Aboriginal Affairs and Northern Development Canada in addition to the legal name of the department.

==== Northern Development ====
The Northern Development part of the department has its origins in the Department of the Interior, a body created by then Prime Minister John A. Macdonald for the purpose of administering the Dominion Lands Act of 1872. When the Department of the Interior dissolved in 1936 (with the Natural Resources Acts transferring control over natural resources to the Prairie provinces), Indian Affairs fell under the purview of the Department of Mines and Resources. However, the need for social and health-care services in the North led to the establishment of the Northern Administration and Lands branch in 1951, which led to the creation of the Department of Northern Affairs and National Resources in 1953. This became the Department of Indian Affairs and Northern Development in 1966. Under the Federal Identity Program, the department is known as Indigenous and Northern Affairs Canada.

==== Annual Arctic expeditions ====
Beginning in the early 20th century, the Government of Canada sponsored annual expeditions to the Canadian North. These expeditions yielded extensive photographic documentation of the lives of northern indigenous peoples by participating explorers, engineers, scientists and medical staff.

Explorer, photographer, filmmaker, writer and lecturer Richard S. Finnie accompanied numerous expeditions to the North. His first voyage was aboard CGS Arctic, under the command of Captain Bernier in 1924. During the 1930–1931 expedition to the Western Arctic, Finnie served as filmmaker. Lachlan T. Burwash, an exploratory engineer with the Department of the Interior, made a survey of the east coasts of Hudson Bay and James Bay, and the Belcher Islands in the late 1920s.

Zoologist Joseph Dewey Soper travelled to the Baffin Island (Qikiqtaaluk) region in the late 1920s in order to document the landscape, as well as the plant and bird life. J.G. Wright, Superintendent of Eastern Arctic Patrol and National Film Board photographer, served on the 1945–1946 expedition sponsored by the Canadian National Institute for the Blind. As the Regional Director of Family Allowances for Yukon and the Northwest Territories, S.J. Bailey served as part of the Eastern Arctic Patrol beginning in the late 1940s.

=== Restructuring of the DIAND ===
In August 2017, the Trudeau ministry announced the dissolution of the Department of Indian Affairs and Northern Development (DIAND) and announced that it would be replaced by the Department of Indigenous Services and the Department of Crown-Indigenous Relations and Northern Affairs Canada. This came into effect as of July 15, 2019. The transition was not instantaneous, with Orders-in-Council initially separating the portfolios, and formal legislation constituting the new departments being passed in July 2019.

According to Trudeau, the rationale behind the restructuring was that "the structures in place at Indigenous and Northern Affairs Canada were created at a time where [sic] the approach around the Indian Act, the approach around our engagement with indigenous peoples, was very much looked at in a paternalistic, colonial way". The new departments are consistent with the 1996 Royal Commission on Aboriginal Peoples' recommendations to improve the delivery of services dramatically and fast-track self-government.

=== Chronology ===
- 1755-1860 British Indian Department
  - 1830-1860 Divided between Upper Canada (Lieutenant Governor) and Lower Canada (Military Secretary to the Governor General)
- 1860-1880 Crown Lands Department Commissions Responsible for Indian Affairs
  - 1868-1869 Under the Department of the Secretary of State of Canada (Superintendent General of Indian Affairs)
  - 1869-1873 Under the Department of the Secretary of State for the Provinces (Superintendent General of Indian Affairs)
  - 1873-1880 Under the Department of the Interior (Superintendent General of Indian Affairs)
- 1880-1936 The Department of Indian Affairs (Minister of the Interior/Superintendent General of Indian Affairs)
  - 1936-1950 Under the Department of Mines and Resources
  - 1950-1965 Under the Department of Citizenship and Immigration
  - 1966 Under the Department of Northern Affairs and National Resources
- 1966-2011 Department of Indian Affairs and Northern Development
  - 1968-1978 Subsection: Indian and Eskimo Affairs
  - 1978-2011 Subsection: Indian and Inuit Affairs in 1978
  - 2011-2015 Publicly known as Aboriginal Affairs and Northern Development Canada
  - 2015-2017 Publicly known as Indigenous and Northern Affairs Canada
- 2019-Present Split into Department of Indigenous Services, the Department of Crown-Indigenous Relations and Northern Affairs Canada

== Organization ==
CIRNAC has offices in ten (10) regions, at headquarters and to deal with oil and gas leases. The offices are further divided into the broad divisions of treaties and aboriginal government; lands and economic development and education and social development. Northern Development is represented in only the Northwest Territories (NWT) and Nunavut (NU) regional offices and headquarters.

== "The Nunavut Project" ==
The Nunavut Land Claims Agreement was implemented in 1993 between the Inuit of the Nunavut Settlement Area and the Government of Canada subject to the Constitution Act of 1982. The territory of Nunavut was formed in 1999. CIRNAC has major responsibilities for managing the lands and resources of Nunavut.

With respect to the Inuit of Nunavut, the department and its Minister have the challenge of implementing the Conciliator's Final Report, dated March 1, 2006 on the Nunavut Land Claims Agreement Implementation Contract Negotiations for the Second Planning Period 2003-2013 "The Nunavut Project" authored by Thomas Berger. This report recommends an increase in Inuit participation in Nunavut's federal and territorial public service.

== See also ==
- Unikkausivut: Sharing Our Stories, an Inuit DVD boxset and website developed in collaboration with the Inuit Relations Secretariat of Aboriginal Affairs and Northern Development Canada.
- First Nation-municipal service agreement
- Indian Agent (Canada)
- Bureau of Indian Affairs US government agency equivalent
- National Indigenous Australians Agency Australian equivalent
