= Tlingit cuisine =

Culinary traditions of the Tlingit people

Tlingit cuisine is the food and drink of the Tlingit people, an Indigenous group of people from Alaska, British Columbia, and the Yukon. It is a central part of Tlingit culture, and the land is an abundant provider. A saying amongst the Tlingit is that "when the tide goes out the table is set." This refers to the richness of intertidal life found on the beaches of Southeast Alaska, most of which can be harvested for food. Another saying is that "in Lingít Aaní you have to be an idiot to starve". Since food is so easy to gather from the beaches, a person who cannot feed himself at least enough to stay alive is considered a fool, perhaps mentally incompetent or suffering from very bad luck.

Though eating off the beach could provide a fairly healthy and varied diet, eating nothing but "beach food" is considered contemptible among the Tlingit, and a sign of poverty. Shamans and their families were required to abstain from all food gathered from the beach, and men might avoid eating beach food before battles or strenuous activities in the belief that it would weaken them spiritually and perhaps physically as well. Thus for both spiritual reasons as well as to add some variety to the diet, the Tlingit harvest many other resources for food besides what they easily find outside their front doors. No other food resource receives as much emphasis as salmon; however, seal and game are both close seconds.

== Nutrition ==
A particular problem with the Tlingit diet is ensuring enough vitamins and minerals are available. Protein is ubiquitous. Iodine from saltwater life is easily obtained from seaweed, but important dietary components such as calcium, vitamin D, vitamin A, and vitamin C are lacking in meat and fish. To ensure that such essentials are available, the Tlingit eat almost all parts of animals they harvest. Bones used for soup stock provide leached calcium, as well as fish vertebrae from boiled salmon. Vitamin A is obtained from livers. Vitamin C is found in berries and plants, such as wild celery, wild crab apples, and a wide assortment of berries. One favorite among the Tlingit is the nagoonberry, also called the Arctic raspberry. Neigóon is the Tlingit word for "jewel". Children work with their parents to gather and prepare these berries. Bone marrow provides valuable iron and vitamin D. Intestines and stomachs are harvested to provide vitamin E and the B complexes.

Today, most Tlingit eat a number of packaged products as well as imported staples such as dairy products, grains, beef, pork, and chicken. In the larger towns most of the American restaurant standards are available, such as pizza, Chinese food, and delicatessen goods. Ice cream and SPAM are particularly popular. Rice (koox) has long been a staple, as have pilot crackers (gháatl), and both have specific terms in Tlingit that are adapted from now-uneaten foods (Kamchatka lily and a type of tree fungus).

== Beach seafood ==
The Tlingit gather razor clams, clams, oysters, mussels, crabs, seaweed, limpets and other sea plants on the beach and they are normally cooked over an open fire or boiled.

A mollusc commonly called the gumboot is considered a delicacy.

== Salmon ==
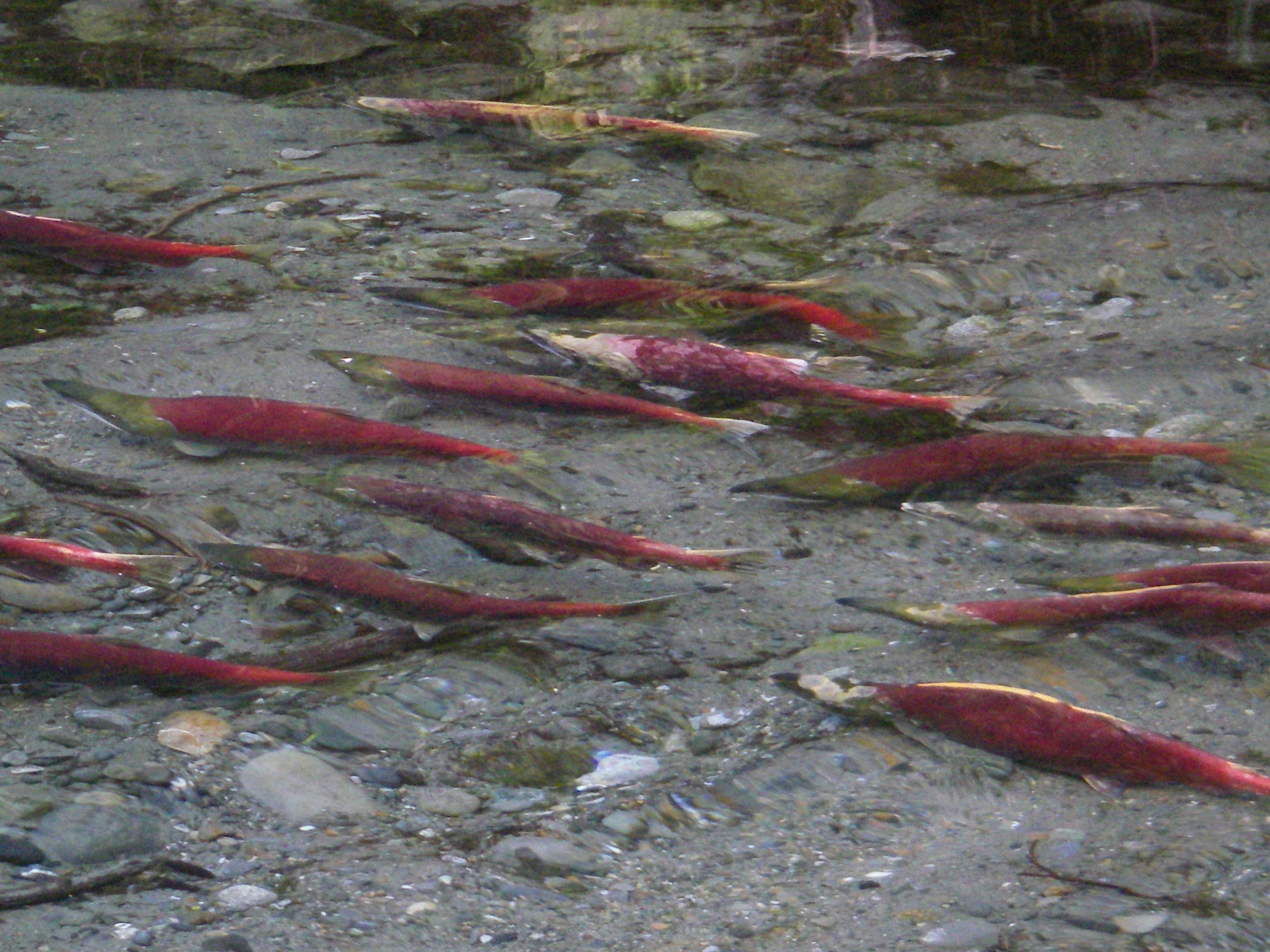
Salmon run in Glacier Bay

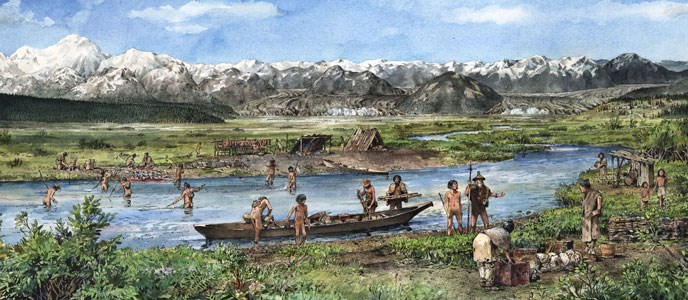
Tlingit salmon fishing camp in the 1700s

The primary staple of the Tlingit diet, salmon was traditionally caught using a variety of methods. The most common was the fishing weir or trap to restrict movement upstream. These traps allowed hunters to easily spear a good amount of fish with little effort. It did, however, required extensive cooperation between the men fishing and the women on the shore doing the cleaning.

=== Harvesting ===
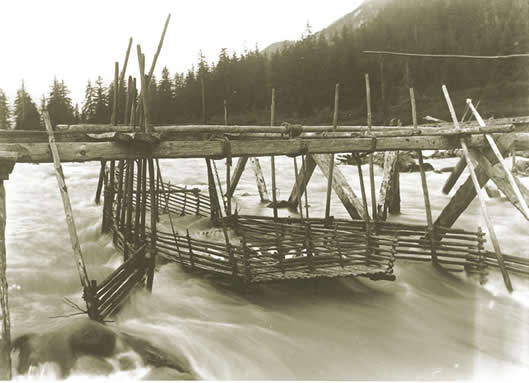
Tlingit fish trap across the Chilkoot River in 1894

Tlingit constructed fish traps in a few ways, depending on the type of river or stream. At the mouth of a smaller stream, they drove rows of wooden stakes into the mud in the tidal zone. The stakes supported a weir of flexible branches. Outside the harvest, the weir was removed but the stakes left. Archaeological work has uncovered a number of sites where long rows of sharpened stakes were hammered into the gravel and mud.

Another trap for smaller streams was made using rocks piled to form long, low walls. These walls submerged at high tide, and the salmon swam over them. Adults and children threw rocks beyond the wall when the tide began receding, scaring the fish into staying inside the wall. Once the tide went down enough to expose the wall, men walked out on the wall to spear the schooling salmon. The remnants of these walls are still visible at the mouths of many streams; although none are in use today. Elders recall them being used in the early twentieth century.

On larger rivers, Tlingit built a weir that either spanned the entire river or merely crossed a channel known for salmon. These weirs followed the pattern above, but instead of depending on the tide to fill them, they had small gaps in the weir with platforms above them. Since salmon were restricted to passage through these small gaps they were easy targets for the spearmen who plucked them from their platforms above the gaps.

Fishwheels, though not traditional, came into use in the late nineteenth century. The mechanism was based on a floating platform tied to a tree on the bank of a river. The wheel consisted of two or four large baskets arranged around an axle. The force of the river's current rotated the baskets as with a conventional waterwheel, and salmon resting in the current were caught in the basket. The basket spilled its contents as it came over the top of the wheel, and the fish dropped into a large pen or container. Fishwheels are still used in some locations, particularly the Copper and Chilkat Rivers. They have the particular advantage of working without constant attendance, and harvesters can come by a few times a day to remove the caught fish and process them. Their disadvantage is that they are slow, and depend largely on luck to catch salmon being pushed downstream by the current; placement in well-known channels increases the recovery, but still does not compare to more active means of harvest.

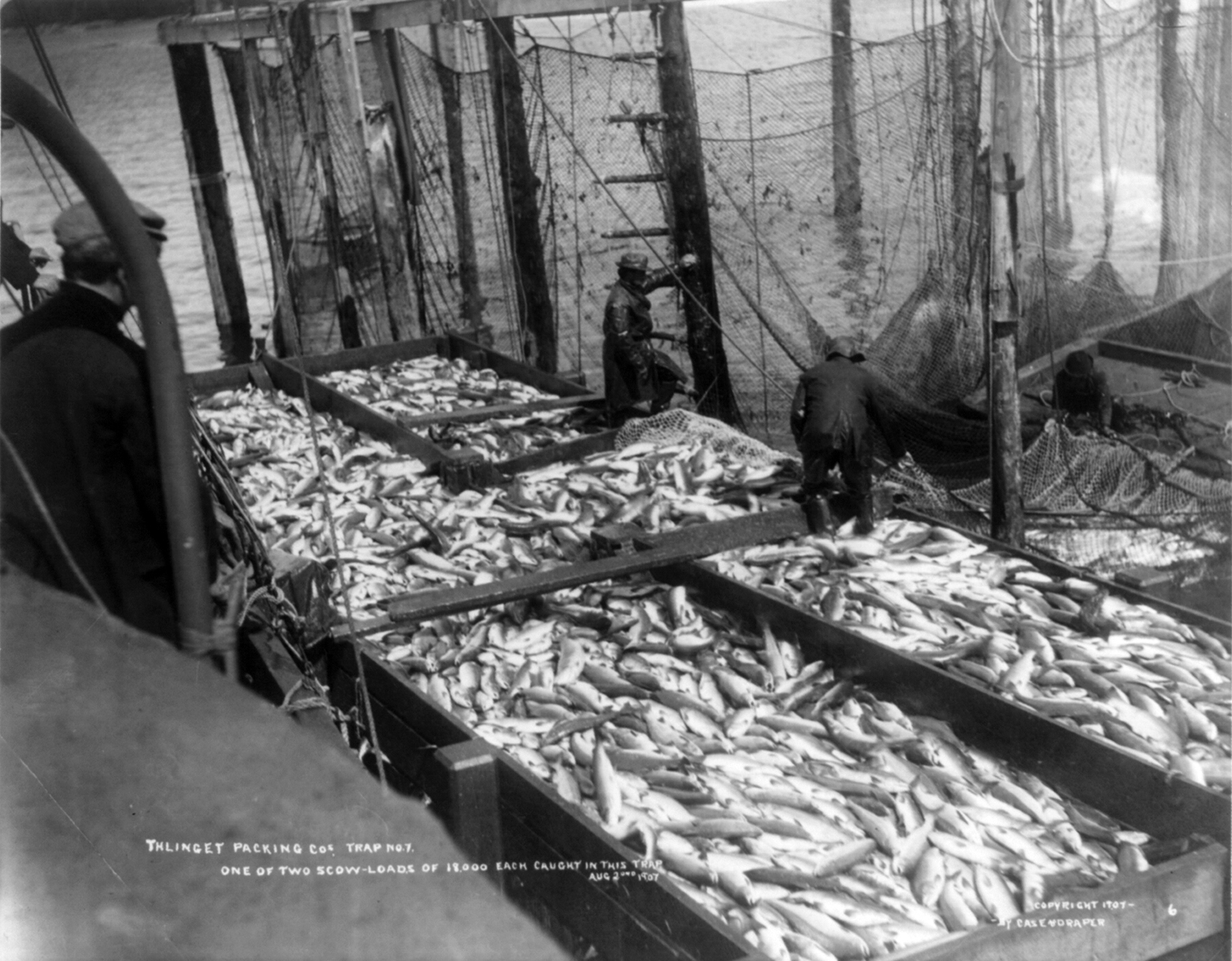
Commercial salmon production by the Tlingit, 1907

None of the traditional means of trapping salmon severely decreased the salmon population, and once the Tlingit harvested enough fish in a particular area they moved to other locations. This left the remaining run to spawn and guarantee future harvests. This is in contrast to commercial fish traps used in Alaska in the nineteenth and twentieth centuries, which devastated runs, and in some cases completely destroyed spawning populations.

With the advent of gasoline motors, winter trolling has become a common practice, and provides fresh fish in the cold months that traditionally depended on stored fish. Trolling poles are similar to those used in sport fishing, but are much heavier and stronger with correspondingly heavier tackle and longer lines. They are set in the stern and along the side gunwales of a boat, baited or strung with flashing spoons or spinners. The boat then slowly motors around areas where salmon, usually kings, are known to school during the winter, aided by ultrasonic fish-finders. Periodically the lines are checked and brought in to remove fish. The same techniques are used for halibut as well. The harvest by this method is fairly small as it depends more on luck; salmon are not guaranteed to bite at lures and bait, unlike the certainty in catching them while spawning. Because of this limited take, trolling is usually avoided during spawning season and only used to bring home fresh fish in the winter. Trolling is often a family event done on the weekends, and often includes overnights on board. Because of the relative inactivity in trolling, the poles are not always well-minded. This occasionally results in seals or sea lions snatching hooked fish still on the line and making off with them.

=== Processing and storage ===
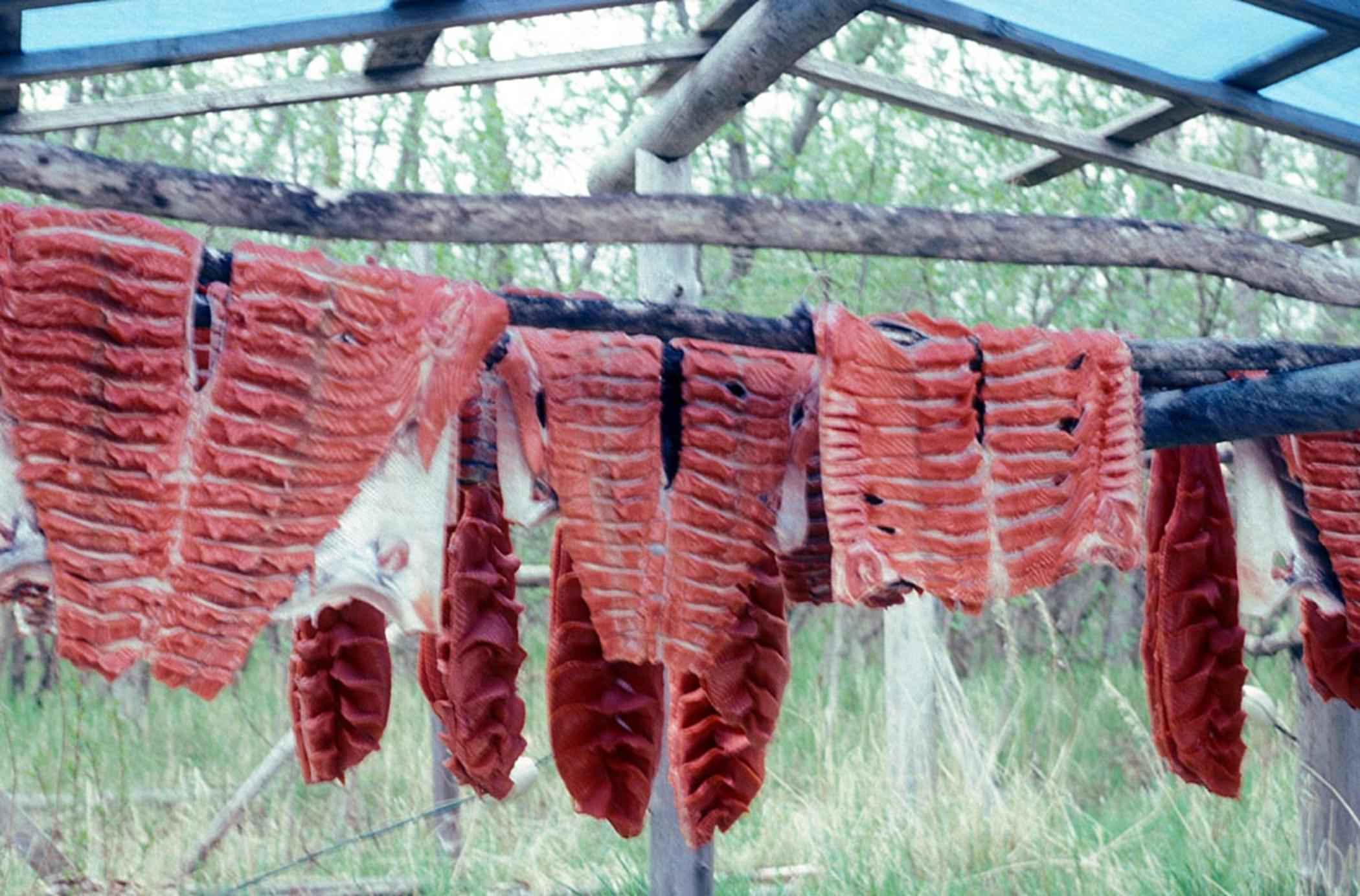
King salmon drying on racks

Salmon are roasted fresh over a fire, frozen, or dried and smoked for preservation. All species of salmon are harvested, and the Tlingit language clearly differentiates them. Certain species are considered more suited for a particular use, such as for hard smoking, canning, or baking. The most common storage methods today are vacuum-sealed freezing of raw fish, and either hard or soft smoking, the latter often followed by canning. Canning may be professionally done at local canneries or at home in mason jars. Smoking itself is done over alder wood either in small modern smoke houses near the family's dwelling or in larger ones at the harvesting sites maintained by particular families. For the former the fish are kept on ice after harvest and until they are brought home, however for the latter the processing is all performed on site.

Tlingit still practice traditional methods of harvesting and processing salmon to some extent, though often alongside more modern methods that require less effort. Salmon are cleaned as soon as they are harvested from the stream or river, and split along the back and left to hang dry on large racks for a few days. This allows the fish's slime to evaporate and makes the flesh easier to work. Some claim it is best to let the salmon soak in salt water overnight before drying, to further reduce the slime and soften the flesh. Drying racks must be watched continuously due to the threat of bears and birds poaching. Once dry, the fish are further cut apart from head to tail and belly to back, then placed in a smokehouse for some period of time. When the fish are taken down, the fillets are further split and slashed or crosshatched to allow more surface area for smoking. Once fully cured, the fish are cut into strips and are ready to eat or store. Traditionally, they were stored in bentwood boxes filled with seal oil. The oil protected the fish from mold and bacteria, and provided a secure method of long-term storage for not only fish, but most other foodstuffs as well. Though some Tlingit can identify the preparer of smoked salmon by the knife patterns in it, this skill is dying out and specific cutting patterns are dispensed with in favor of the simplest slashing or crosshatching.

During the summer harvesting season most people lived in their smokehouses, transporting the walls and floors from their winter houses to their summer locations, where the frame for the house stood. Besides living in smokehouses, other summer residences were little more than hovels built from blankets and bark set up near the smokehouse. In the years following the introduction of European trade, canvas tents with wood stoves came into fashion. Since this was merely a temporary location, and since the primary purpose of the residence was not for living but for smoking fish, the Tlingit cared little for the summer house's habitability, as noted by early European explorers, and in stark contrast to the remarkable cleanliness maintained in winter houses.

=== Commercial and subsistence fishing ===
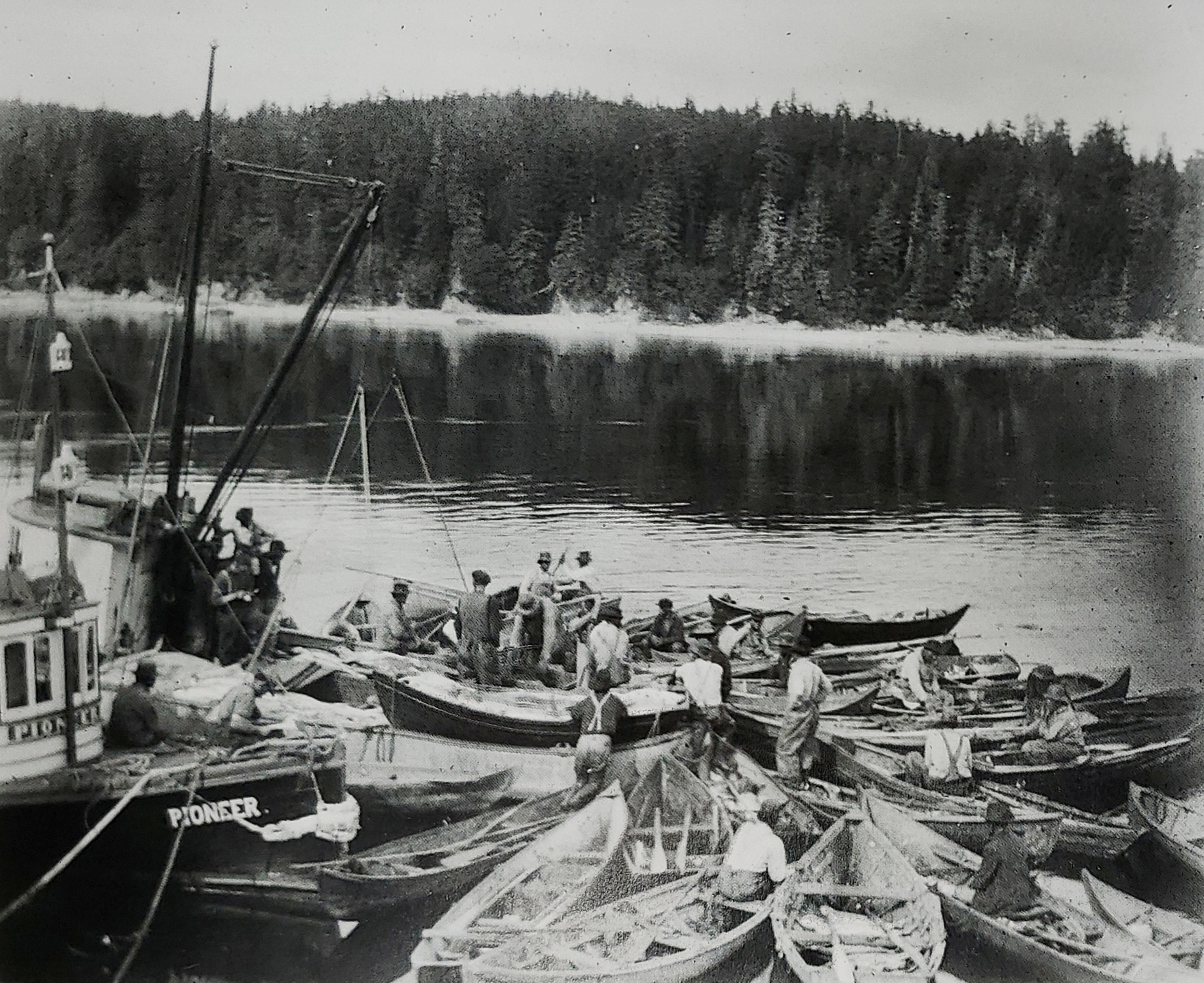
Tlingit fishermen selling salmon ca. 1890s-1910s

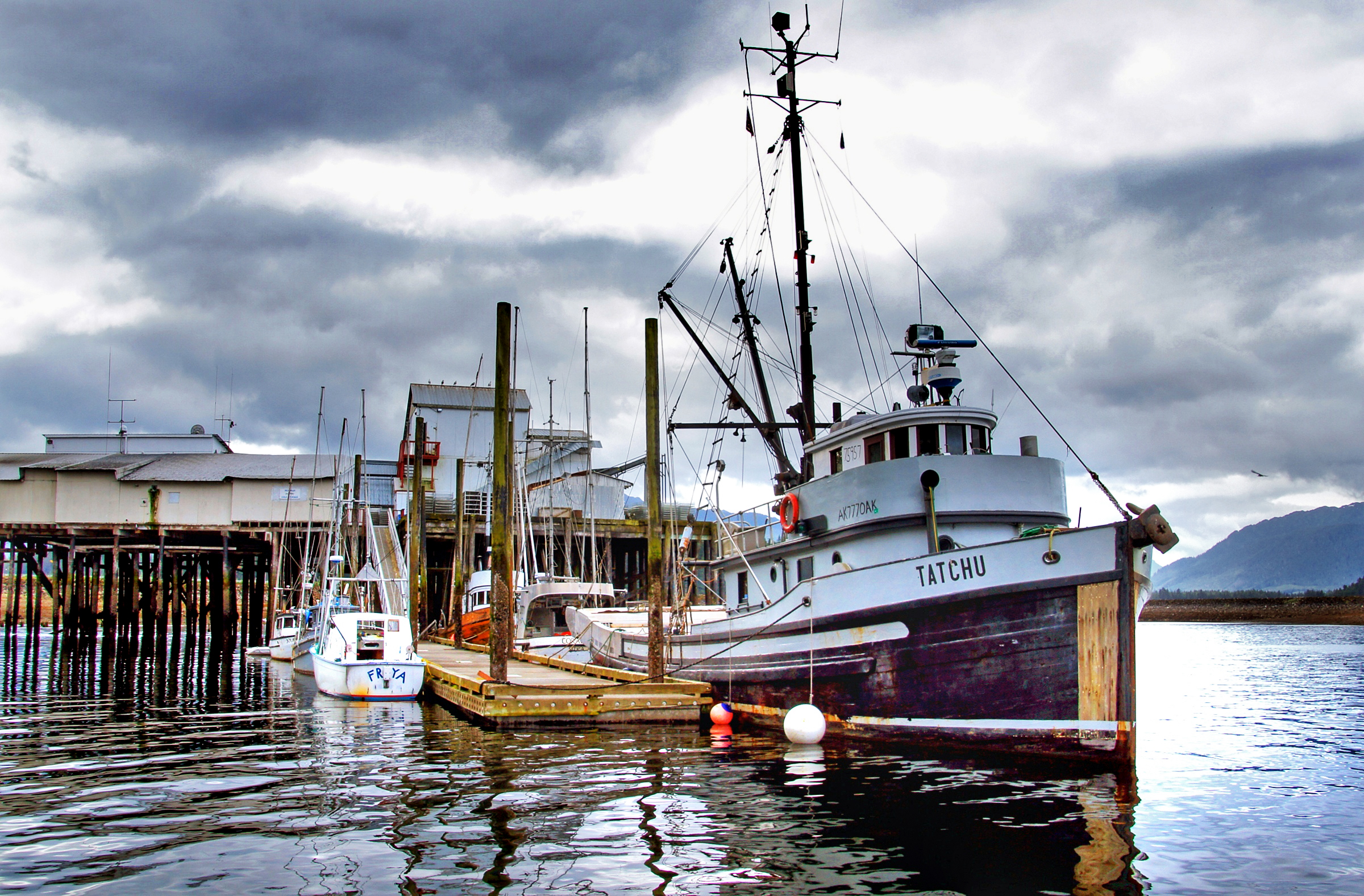
Fishing boats in the Tlingit town of Hoonah, Alaska

Many Tlingit are involved in the Alaskan commercial salmon fisheries. Alaskan law provides for commercial fishermen to set aside a portion of their commercial salmon catch for subsistence or personal use, and today many families no longer fish extensively but depend on a few relatives in the commercial fishery to provide the bulk of their salmon store. Despite this, subsistence fishing is still widely practiced, particularly during weekend family outings.

== Halibut ==
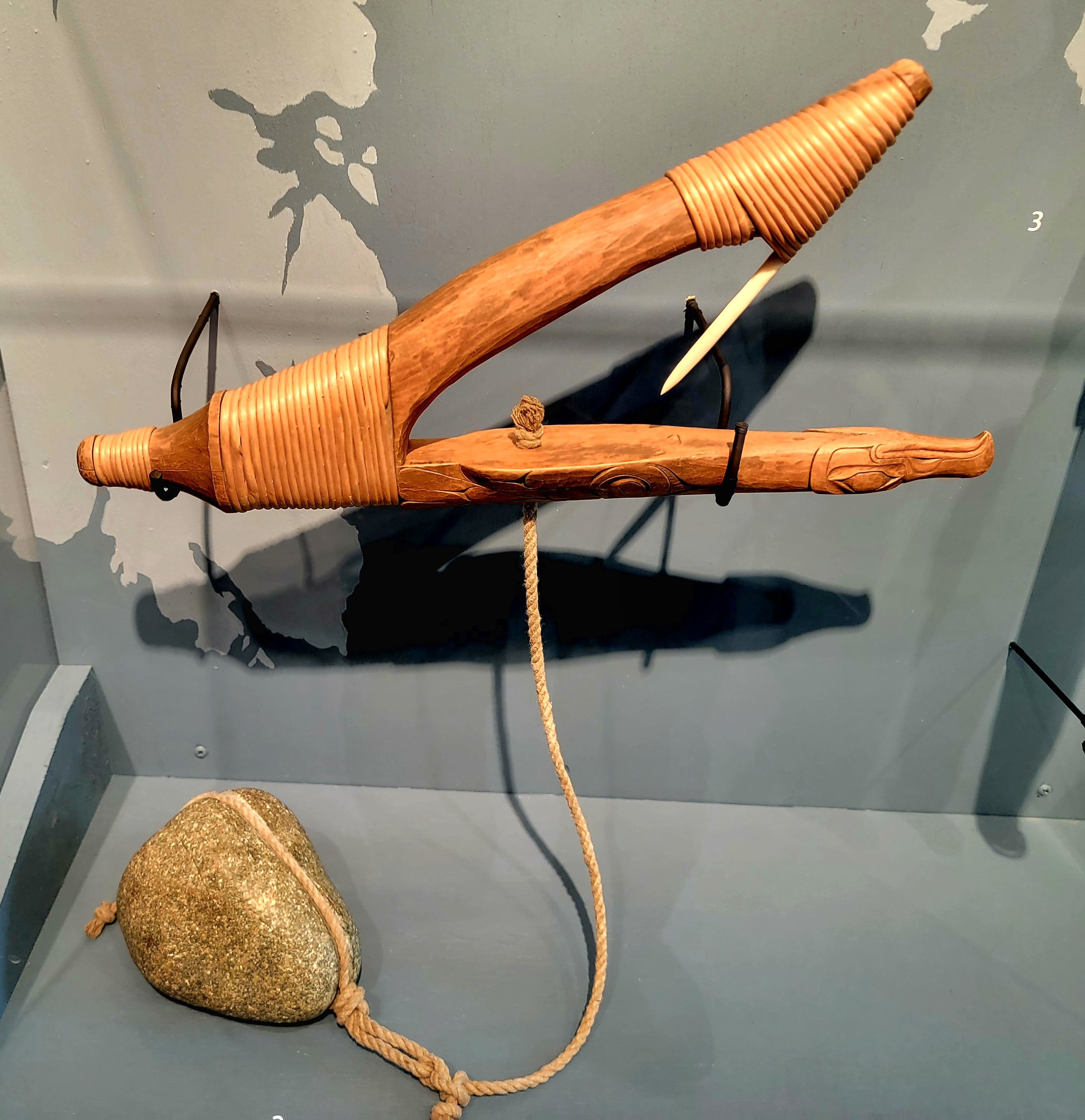
Wooden halibut hook and stone sinker at the Totem Heritage Center in Ketchikan, Alaska

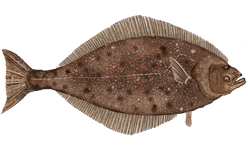
Pacific halibut

Halibut was the second most important species among Tlingit food sources. The Tlingit ate freshly caught halibut and also dried the fish for consumption in the winter and also as a trade commodity. Instead of using fish traps as they did for catching and spearing salmon, the Tlingit used sophisticated wooden halibut hooks and associated fishing gear. These hooks were carefully designed to spare smaller, younger halibut and the largest breeding adults, and focus instead on catching the medium sized halibut. Fishing for halibut had great spiritual significance and was seen as a battle between the halibut people who needed to be respected, and the Tkingit fishermen. The wooden hooks had carvings of various creatures and shaman images intended both to frighten the halibut and to show respect for them.

== Herring and hooligan ==
Herring (Clupea pallasii) and hooligan (Thaleichthys pacificus) are both important food sources in the Tlingit diet. Various species of clams, crabs and mussels were also gathered for food.

They are small fish that return in enormous schools to spawn near the mouths of freshwater rivers and streams. Herring are traditionally harvested with herring rakes, long poles with spikes that are swirled around in the schooling fish. An experienced herring raker can bring up ten or more fish with each swing, and deftly flick the fish from the rake into the bottom of the boat. Raking can be enhanced with pens, weirs, and other techniques of condensing the large schools. More modern methods usually involve small aperture nets and purse seining. Herring are usually processed like salmon, dried and smoked whole. Cleaning and removal of the viscera is optional, and if being frozen whole many do not bother due to the diminutive size of the fish. They are traditionally stored by submerging in seal oil (the "Tlingit refrigerator"), but in modern times may be canned, salted, or frozen, the latter usually in vacuum-sealed bags.

Herring eggs are also harvested, and are considered a delicacy, sometimes called "Tlingit caviar". Either ribbon kelp or (preferably) hemlock branches are submerged in an area where herring are known to spawn, and are marked with a buoy. They may be unattended during spawning, or the herring may be herded into the area and penned with nets to force them to spawn on the kelp or hemlock. Once enough eggs are deposited, the herring are released from the pen to spawn further, thus ensuring future harvests. The branches or kelp are removed and boiled in large cauldrons or fifty-five-gallon drums on the beach, often as part of a family or community event. Children are often tasked with stirring the water with large paddles. The cooked eggs may be salted, frozen, dried in cakes, or submerged in seal oil to preserve them for use throughout the year.

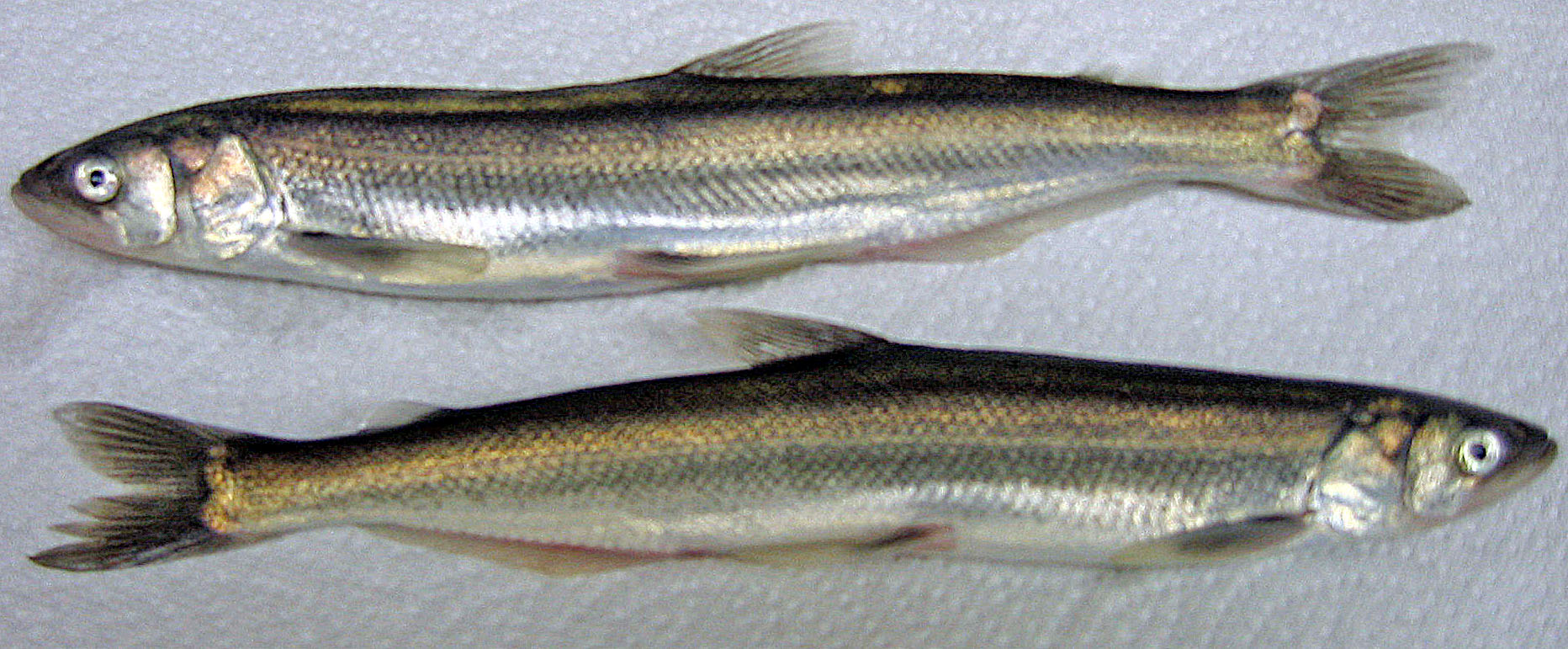
Eulachon

Hooligan are harvested by similar means as herring; however, they are valued more for their oil than for their flesh. Instead of smoking, they are usually tried for their oil by boiling and mashing in large cauldrons or drums (traditionally old canoes and hot rocks were used), the oil skimmed off the surface with spoons and then strained and stored in bentwood boxes (today in commercial containers, e.g., glass jars). Hooligan oil was a valuable trade commodity, and enriched khwáan such as the Chilkat who saw regular hooligan runs every year in their territory. Today hooligan are, when not tried for their oil, most often vacuum-sealed and frozen, kept in large freezers found outside many Tlingit households.

When cooked, both herring and hooligan are usually served whole with heads still attached. Some people eat the entire fish, others strip the meat and viscera off with their teeth and leave the skeleton; eating of the viscera is very common, in contrast with the universal disposal of salmon viscera. Methods of preparation often involve deep-frying or pan frying, although baking is also common and is more traditional. As with salmon, they may be pierced with a stick and set over a fire to roast; this is a particularly common practice during the harvest when overnighting at a remote location, or at a beach party or picnic.

== Other fish ==
Halibut, cod, bullhead, flounder, shark, salmon, etc.

Halibut were eaten frequently, as were herring and lingcod. Halibut were killed by spear or by club depending on size and weight, or caught with specialized halibut hooks.

== Marine mammals ==
=== Seals ===
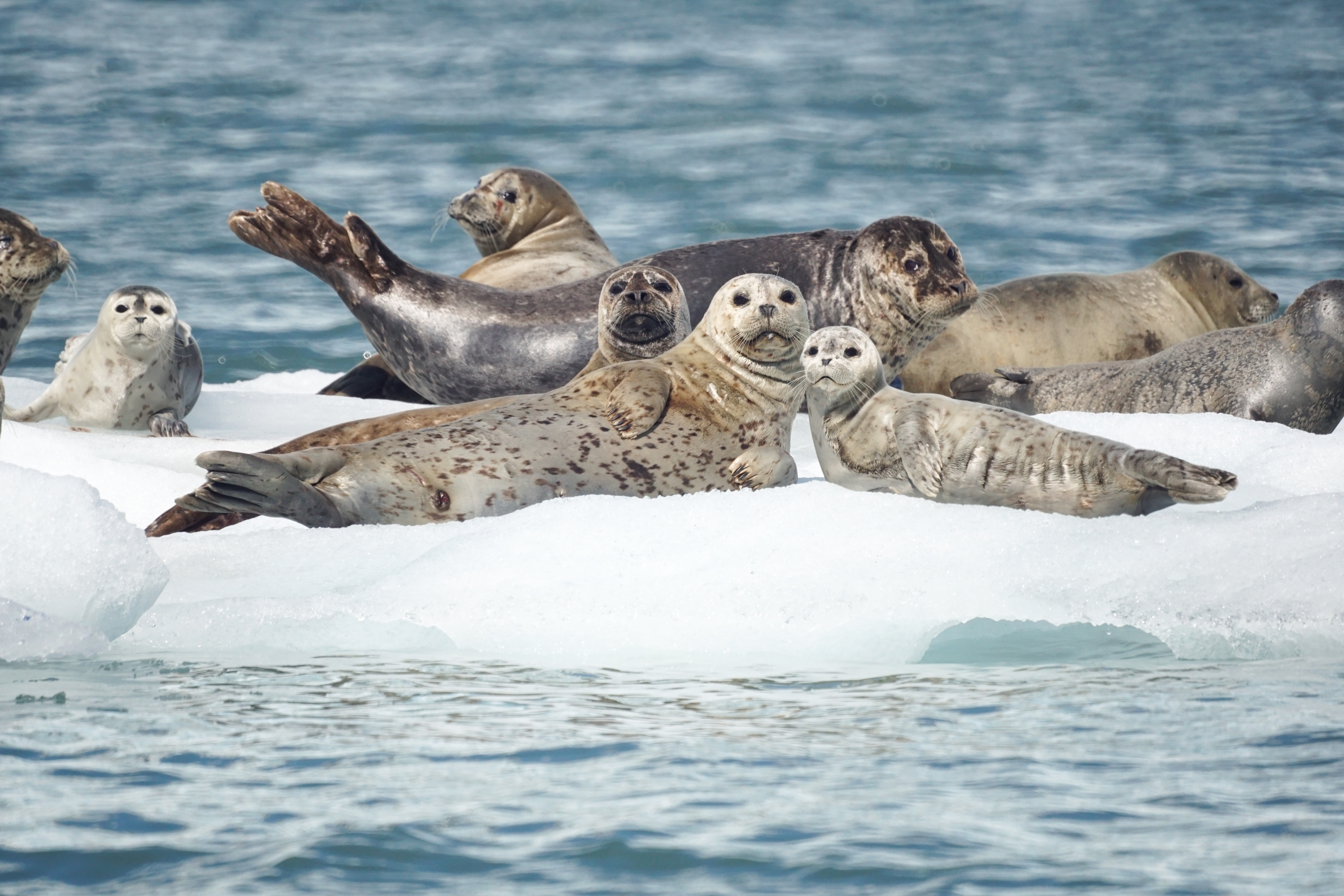
Harbor seals

Research by archeologists has shown that Tlingit peoples have been hunting harbor seals with harpoons for almost 600 years or longer. The 300 Tlingit residents of Yakutat, Alaska continue their traditional subsistence hunting of seals, taking 345 seals in 2015, down from 640 seals in 1996. They have modified their diet in response to the decline in seal populations.

=== Whales ===
Unlike almost all other north Pacific coast peoples, the Tlingit do not hunt whale. Various explanations have been offered, but the most common reason given is that since a significant portion of the society relates itself with either the killer whale or other whale species via clan crest and hence as a spiritual member of the family, eating whale was tantamount to cannibalism. A more practical explanation follows from the tendency of the Tlingit to harvest and eat in moderation despite the surrounding abundance of foodstuffs. Thus whale is treated similarly to shellfish—as a second-class food, only eaten when other food sources have failed, and whose consumption indicates poverty. A whale provides a large amount of food that spoils easily, and distribution of food outside the household requires elaborate and expensive potlatching. Whale hunting is also a large cooperative endeavor, and requires extensive interaction between clans for success. Such interactions can produce obligations that are difficult to repay. Thus the Tlingit avoided the whale harvest for sociopolitical and socioeconomic reasons.

The Gulf Coast Tlingit around Yakutat are the exception to the rule, hunting whale occasionally. Many Tlingit explain the Gulf Coast whale hunt as an areal influence of the Eyak and the Alutiiq Eskimos of Prince William Sound further north. However, all Tlingit eat beached whales, considering this a gift that should not be wasted. A story in the Raven Cycle relates how Raven was swallowed by a whale and then ate it from inside out, eventually killing and beaching it; this is considered to justify Tlingit harvests of beached whales. However, beached whales are fairly uncommon in Southeast Alaska since the beaches are very rocky and often nearly nonexistent, thus whale forms only a very small part of the Tlingit diet.

== Game ==
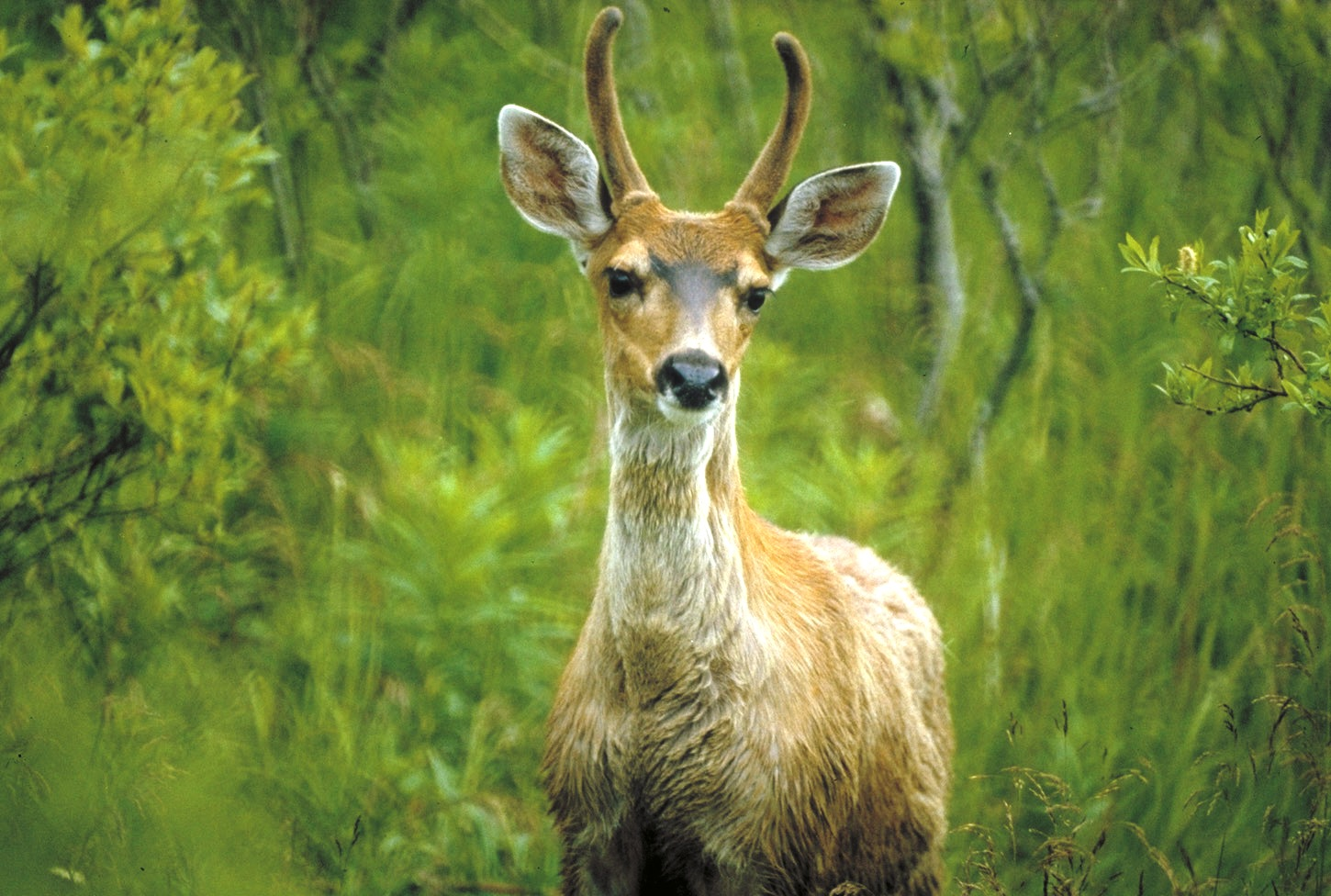
Sitka deer

Game forms a sizable component of the traditional Tlingit diet, and the majority of food that is not derived from the sea. Major game animals hunted for food are Sitka deer, mountain goat in mountainous regions, black bear and brown bear, beaver, and, on the mainland, moose.

== Eggs ==
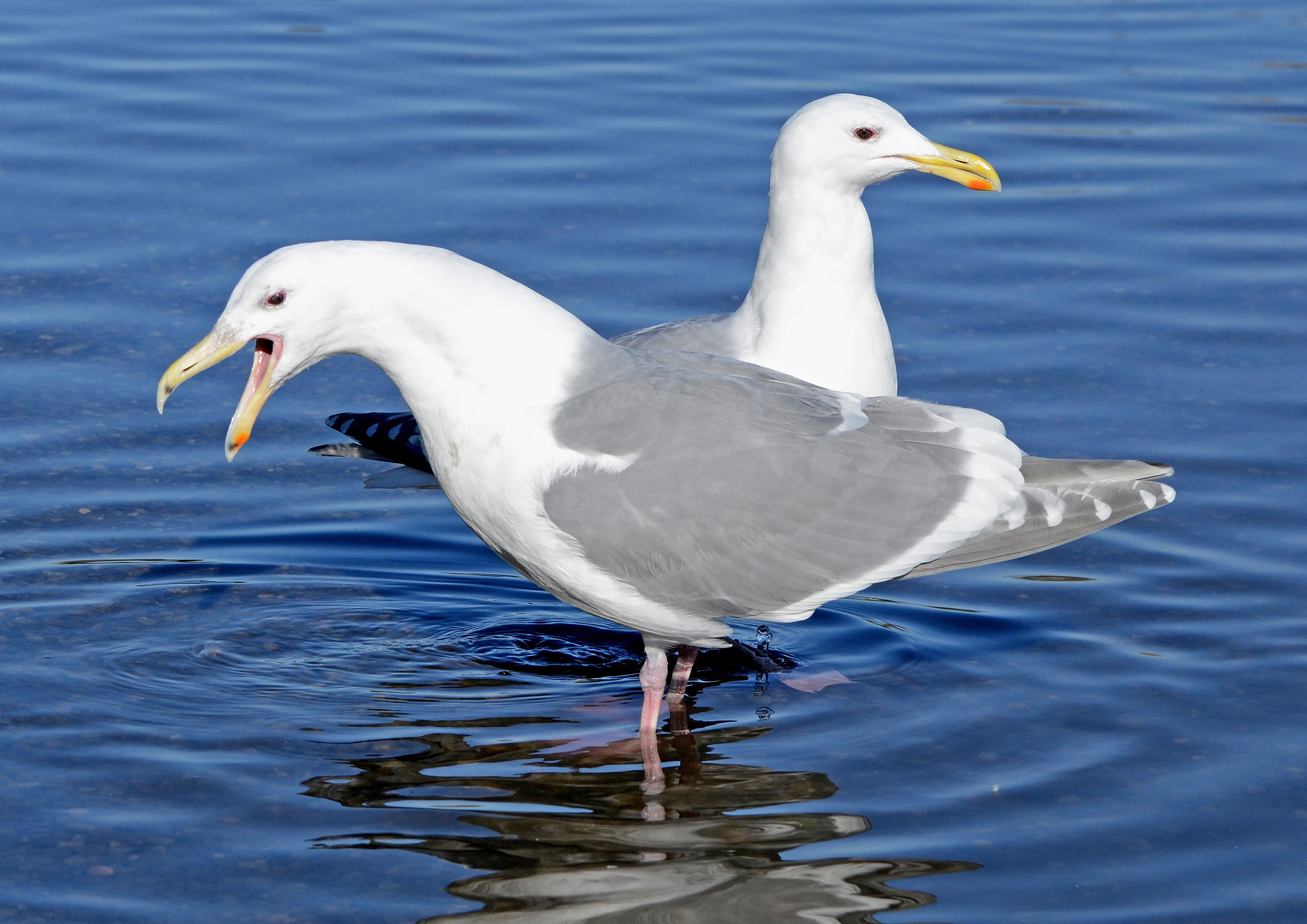
Glaucous-winged gull pair

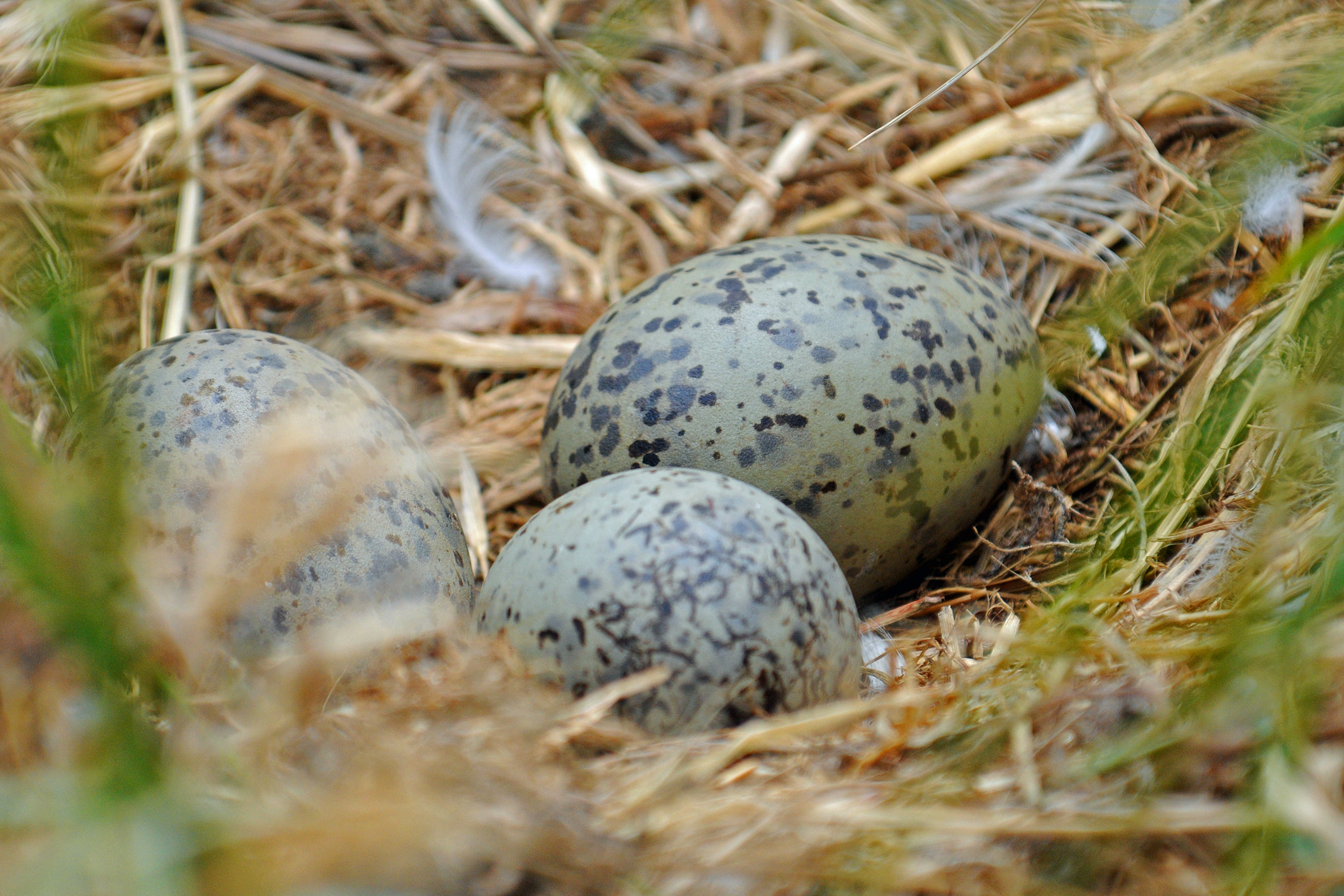
Glaucous-winged gull (Larus) nest with eggs

For hundreds of years, and again in recent years, the Tlingit have gathered the eggs of the glaucous-winged gull, especially from island rookeries near the mouth of what is now Glacier Bay National Park. This practice had been illegal there since 1965, but was legalized in 2014, when President Barack Obama signed the Huna Tlingit Traditional Gull Egg Use Act, after years of scientific study determined that the practice could resume without threatening the gull populations.

A Tlingit elder was quoted as saying, "Gathering eggs in Glacier Bay was something especially the family looked forward to. It was like Easter. Family and cousins gathered up there and we collected eggs, and it was a joyous occasion." The time of gathering eggs from mid-May to mid-June each year symbolized the transition from reliance on stored and preserved foods to the time of active fishing, hunting and gathering in the warmer months. The month of egg gathering was called the "Going to Get Eggs Moon" in the traditional Tlingit calendar

== Potatoes ==
The Tlingit have been cultivating a local variety of potato for hundreds of years. This is a primitive cultivar called 'Maria's Tlingit potato', planted in south-facing plots. Potatoes are not native to southeast Alaska, but have been cultivated there for centuries. Theories about how they arrived include through Russian traders and Tlingit accounts of canoe voyages as far south as South America that may have brought potatoes back.

== See also ==
- Native American cuisine
- Pacific salmon
- Pacific Northwest cuisine
