= Siqqitiq =

Ritual of converting Inuit to Christianity

Siqqitiq (meaning transforming one's life, more specifically adopting Christianity) is the ritual of converting Inuit with shamanist beliefs to Christianity. This is usually accompanied by ritualistic consumption of foods held taboo by shamanist belief (including caribou lung and heart.
