= Wooden halibut hook =

Type of fish hook

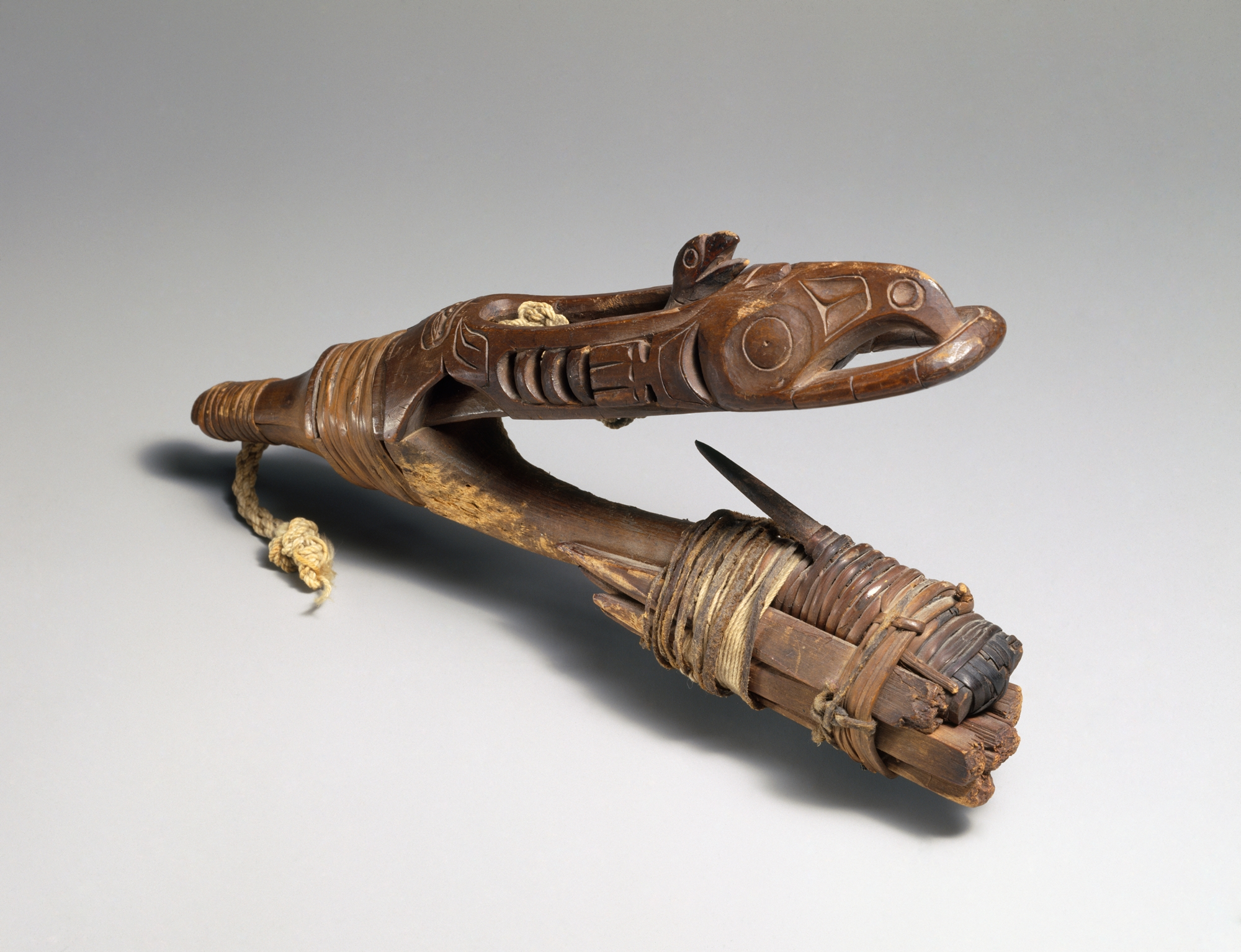
Early 19th-century Tlingit halibut hook on display at the Metropolitan Museum of Art

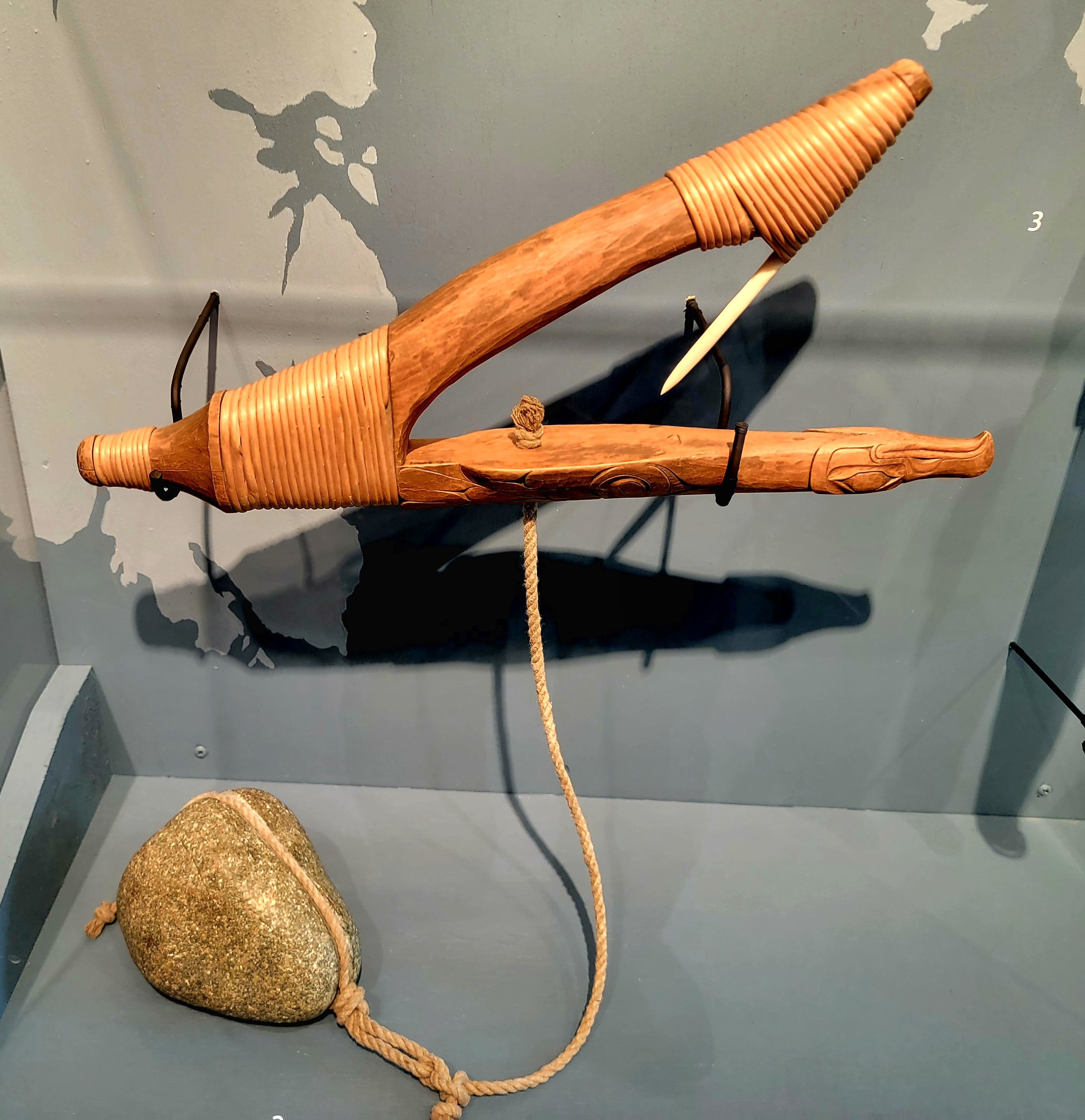
Wooden halibut hook and stone sinker at the Totem Heritage Center in Ketchikan, Alaska

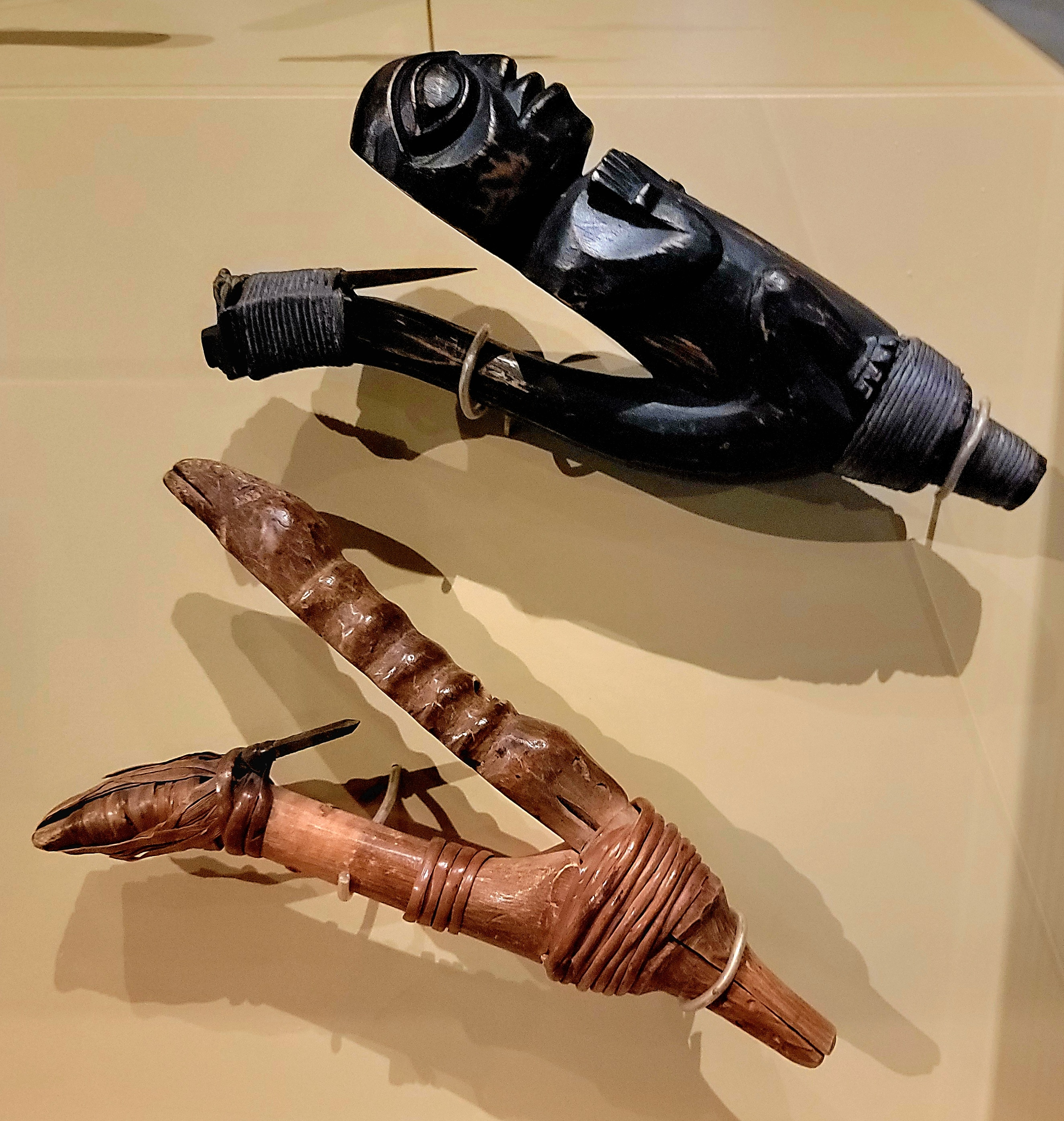
Wooden halibut hooks at the Sitka Historical Museum

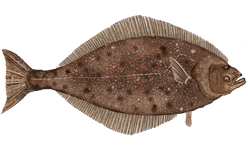
Pacific halibut

A wooden halibut hook is a type of fish hook, historically used by the indigenous peoples of the Pacific Northwest Coast to catch Pacific halibut. In addition to their utilitarian function, wooden halibut hooks have artistic value, and spiritual significance to the cultures that traditionally used them. Rarely used for fishing in the late 20th century, and appreciated more as art objects, they are undergoing a comeback for subsistence fishing in the early 21st century, and have several benefits in day-to-day use.

== Alaska and British Columbia ==
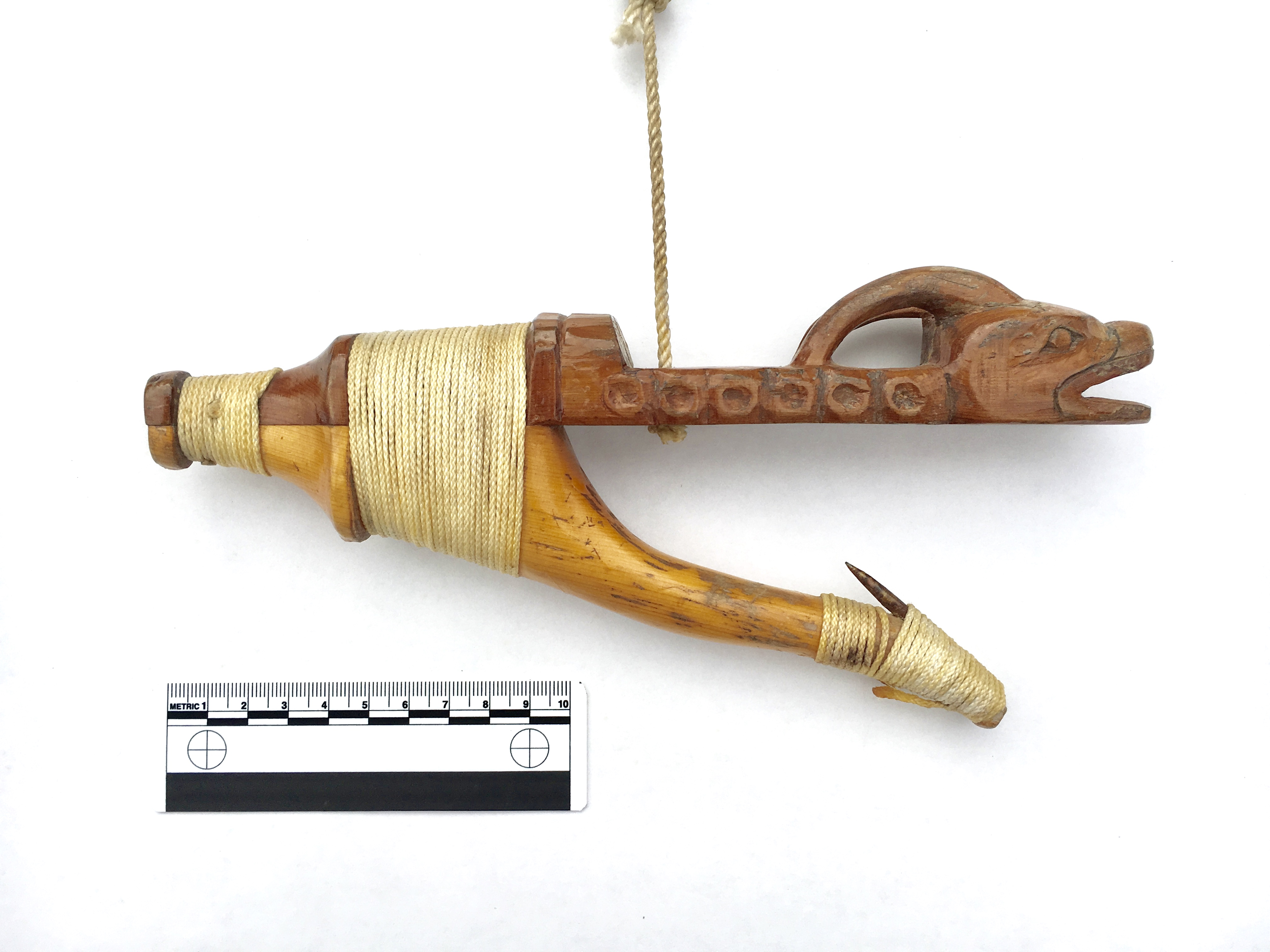
Mountain goat transforming into octopus (devilfish). Carved by Jon Rowan, Klawock, Alaska, 2005. 24 cm. This particular hook was actually fished successfully; teeth marks appear on the barbed arm.

In southeast Alaska and along the British Columbia Coast, wooden halibut hooks have been used for thousands of years by three tribes, the Tlingit, the Haida and the Tsimshian. In the Tlingit language, the hooks are called náxw.

In this region, the hooks are composed of two pieces of wood lashed together, and a lashed barb. Traditionally, one piece was made of Yellow cedar, and the other piece was made of Pacific yew. Lore has it that halibut are attracted by the aroma of cedar. The barb was traditionally made out of a wedge of bear bone, and more recently, iron or steel has been used. The cedar, more buoyant than the yew, allows the hook to orient in the proper direction. The traditional lashing material was made out of spruce root, cedar bark or kelp braids.

== Washington ==
The Makah people, who live on the northwestern part of the Olympic Peninsula, have traditionally also used wooden hooks to catch halibut. Their hooks were made out of a long single piece of wood, which was steam bent into a hook with a distinctive shape. In the Makah language, this type of hook is called a čibu·d.

== Traditional uses and cultural significance ==
Pacific halibut are, as adults, very large demersal fishes who feed near the ocean bottom offshore. Traditional working wooden halibut hooks usually have a stone sinker attached, to keep the hook at the optimum level above the bottom, in order to catch halibut of moderate weight. Octopus is a common bait.

A carved wooden fishing float is used to signal the fisherman that a halibut has been hooked. Halibut tend to gulp in rather than nibble at what they assume to be food, and forcefully try to spit out foreign objects. As a result, the wooden halibut hook will embed itself securely in the halibut's mouth, and the sinker will start splashing around. Wooden hooks of traditional size were optimized to catch medium-sized halibut ranging from nine to 45 kilograms. The younger fish and the much larger breeding fish were spared, with benefits to the fishery. According to the Sealaska Heritage Institute, "The hooks also were designed to flip the halibut belly-side-up when reeling them in, making them more docile and easier to land."

The yew portion of the hook was traditionally carved with an image intended to express respect for the halibut and spiritual comfort to the fishermen engaged in a very dangerous job. Common images are of the octopus, the raven, the halibut itself and the shaman, a supernatural entity believed to have the power to control the weather.

== Academic study ==
One problem with mass-produced halibut hooks is an unacceptable level of bycatch, the unintended catching of unwanted and possibly threatened fish species. Researchers with expertise in fishing by native peoples in the state of Washington conducted a two phase study comparing the performance of traditional and modern versions of čibu.d hooks of the Makah people, made out of wood, plastic, steel and brass, with standard modern circle hooks commonly used to catch halibut. The lead researcher is affiliated with the Northwest Indian Fisheries Commission. The first phase showed that a brass reproduction of the čibu.d was the most promising for this study. The second phase compared the actual fishing performance of the brass čibu.d against "a standard 16/0 circle hook and paired 8/0 circle hooks". The conclusion was that the fishing performance was equivalent and that "the improved catching performance of čibu.d on halibut and reduced bycatch compared to other popular approaches can be achieved by using brass čibu.d. Managers of recreational halibut fisheries should consider the use of čibu.d in areas where bycatch is a concern."

Jonathan Malindine of the University of California, Santa Barbara, and the Santa Barbara Museum of Natural History, studied 109 wooden halibut hooks at the Smithsonian Institution's Museum Support Center. Some were as old as 1867, and he also studied 25 hooks from art galleries, museums, and private collectors. He created a database by taking 11 measurements of each hook. Malindine's paper traces the design of the hook, how its dimensions have changed over time, and highlights how the hook's function has evolved from a utilitarian tool to a symbolic representation of cultural heritage. He also found that the length of the hooks increased over time, favoring collectability over functionality.

== Revival ==
As the Alaskan native communities embraced modern fishing techniques and the market economy in the 20th century, the use of wooden fish hooks almost entirely faded away. A handful of dedicated traditional fishermen kept the craft and the skills alive.

In 2018, The Juneau Economic Development Council and the Alaska State Committee for Research (SCoR) brought the wooden halibut hook into their Alaska Innovators Hall of Fame in 2018. Dedicated proponents like Thomas George Jonathan Rowan and Michael Douville have continued making, carving and fishing with wooden halibut hooks for decades, as well as advocating for regulatory reform to allow their more widespread use, and teaching young people how to make them and fish with them. At Juneau-Douglas High School, science teacher Henry Hopkins trains students in wooden halibut hook carving techniques, and they learn things like sustainable fisheries management and changes in the oceans in his biology class.

The Sealaska Heritage Institute, an educational branch of the Alaska native owned Sealaska Corporation, has produced 17 YouTube instructional videos about making and using wooden halibut hooks. Héendei Donald Gregory, a Tlingit artist, presents the videos. SHI president Rosita Whorl said "Our ancestors were ingenious in their engineering of halibut hooks, which also had spiritual dimensions. Traditional halibut hooks were sophisticated and designed to preserve the species in a way that modern hooks cannot."
