= Okichitaw =

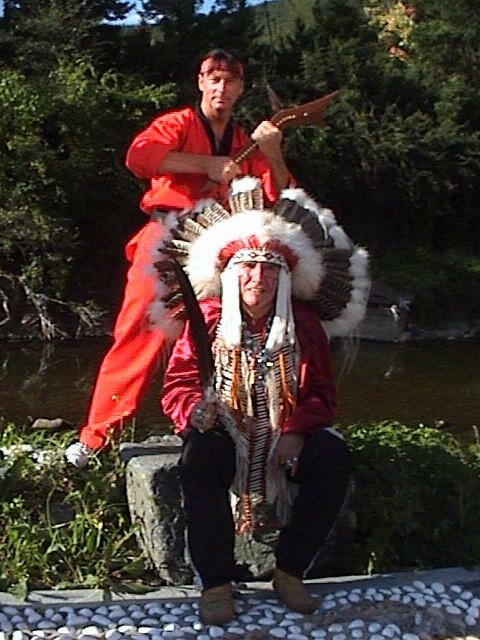
- George Lépine (background) with a gunstock war club, a traditional throwing club used by Indigenous peoples of North America.
- Focus: Hybrid
- Country of origin: Canada
- Creator: George J. Lépine
- Parenthood: Cree fighting techniques, Hapkido, Taekwondo
- Olympic sport: no

Okichitaw is a martial art based on the traditional fighting techniques of the Cree people. It was founded by Canadian martial artist George J. Lépine.

== Etymology ==
The term Okichitaw is derived from the Cree word okichitawak, an honorific title given to Cree warriors who had distinguished themselves in battle. The word okichitawak was modified to Okichitaw to make it easier for English speakers to pronounce.

== History ==
George Lépine is a Michif Cree (Assiniboine) from Manitoba, Canada, who was raised in the traditions of Cree culture. From an early age, he studied traditional Indigenous wrestling, tomahawk throwing, and Indigenous close-combat techniques (miche che kiske). He also studied East Asian martial arts extensively, earning black belts in both taekwondo and hapkido.

In the early 1990s, Lépine began documenting and systematising the traditional fighting techniques of the Cree. By incorporating elements of East Asian martial arts, he developed what is now known as Okichitaw. The principal Okichitaw training centre (mistiko kamik) is located at the Native Canadian Centre of Toronto.

== Weapons ==
Okichitaw primarily involves training with the gunstock war club and the long knife. Beginners initially learn unarmed hand techniques before progressing to weapons training.

More advanced practitioners eventually train with the tomahawk instead of the gunstock war club. This includes tomahawk-throwing techniques. Although the tomahawk is somewhat heavier than the gunstock war club, the techniques used with the two weapons are very similar.
