= Wabbicommicot =

Mississauga chief (d. 1768)

Wabbicommicot (died 1768) was a Mississauga chief instrumental in maintaining friendly relations between his Mississauga tribe and the British. Throughout his chiefship, Wabbicommicot had about 150 warriors under his control.

== Biography ==
Although it is not known when Wabbicommicot was born, his name first appears on some British documents detailing a meeting between him and Sir William Johnson, 1st Baronet, the British superintendent of northern Indians at Fort Niagara in July 1761. Rumours had spread that a number of key Seneca figures had been attempting to provoke rebellion against the British among western tribes, so Sir Johnson had been travelling to Detroit for an initial meeting with those tribes allied with the French. Wabbicommicot accompanied Johnson on this trip and thanked Johnson for bringing peace to "our Country which was in a treamor". However, no amount of negotiation on the part of Johnson could make up for years of the British policy of severing the Indians' supply of rum and ammunition.

During the winter of 1762–3, Wabbicommicot reported to a Toronto-based trader that the First Nations in the region had been put on alert that a French contingent would be arriving shortly to retake the area, and that war would break out between the Indians and the British in spring. Wabbicommicot insisted that he was against a plan such as this, but said that he could not warn his people against it. In May 1763, Wabbicommicot arrived at Fort Niagara to demand rum for his people, warning that he would not be able to guarantee friendly outcomes should his demand be refused. Despite Wabbicommicot's alliance with the British, the personnel at Fort Niagara soon received word that some traders were attacked by Mississaugas at the mouth of the Grand River.

In October 1763, Wabbicommicot travelled to Detroit to make a peace offering to the commandant there. He claimed that not only his own tribe but also the Ottawas and the Ojibwas wanted peace in the region. This statement was given weight by the Ojibwa's subsequent release of six prisoners as proof that they wanted to end the war. By 1764, the fighting had ceased, and in September Wabbicommicot was present at the signing of a major treaty in Detroit. In the following years, Wabbicommicot continued his friendship with Johnson at Fort Niagara, feeding him news on occasion. In 1767, Wabbicommicot was asked by the British to put an end to the illicit trading occurring at Toronto. In August 1768, Mississaugas appeared at Fort Niagara and informed Johnson of Wabbicommicot's death.
