= First Nations University Students' Association =

First Nations University of Canada - Students' Association
- Formation: 1994
- Location: Regina, Saskatchewan, Canada
- Parent organization: First Nations University of Canada
- Affiliations: CFS,
- Website: FNUnivSA.ca

First Nations University Students' Association (FNUnivSA) was formed in 1994 by students of the First Nations University of Canada (then, the Saskatchewan Indian Federated College-SIFC). FNUnivSA is a membership-driven, non-profit, organization currently representing the students of the First Nations University of Canada (FNUniv), Regina campus. FNUnivSA is an active member of the Canadian Federation of Students (Local 90). Members of FNUnivSA are also members of the University of Regina Students Union (URSU).

The FNUnivSA created a website www.FNUniverse.com (2007) and newsletter (2006) in response to lack of communication on campus. As of 2016, the website is now non-functional, and the status of the newsletter is unknown.

The organization will soon be incorporated under the Non-profit Corporations Act, 1995.

The FNUnivSA is involved with the fight to get the federal government to restore funding to the University.
