= Pittailiniit =

Pittailiniit (Inuit: ᐱᑦᑕᐃᓕᓃᑦ) refers to ritual prohibitions and taboos within Inuit culture.

The Canadian Translation Bureau uses the term to refer to legal prohibitions in general.

One example included a prohibition on helping others who had broken other pittailiniit in their times of need.
