= Institute of Indigenous Government =

- Type: Private Aboriginal-run post-secondary institution component of Nicola Valley Institute of Technology
- Established: 1995
- Affiliations: ACCC, CCAA.
- Location: Burnaby, British Columbia, Canada; 49.2464°N 123.0047°W
- Campus: Urban/Suburban
- Website: Institute of Indigenous Government

The Institute of Indigenous Government, Canada's First Nations College, is a publicly funded post-secondary education institute located in Burnaby, British Columbia. Established in 1995, the institute was originally located in the Gastown neighbourhood of Vancouver. Its corporate owners, members, faculty, and students were made up of indigenous people from around the world, in the majority. In September 2007, the Institute of Indigenous Government became part of the Nicola Valley Institute of Technology; an aboriginal-run, private institute in Merritt, British Columbia, that was started in 1983.

The Institute awarded credentials (Bachelor degrees, Associate Degrees, Diplomas, or Certificates) in the following areas of studies:

- Animal Welfare
- Adult Dogwood Diploma (British Columbia High school diploma)
- Business Administration
- Criminology
- English as a Second Language (ESL)
- First Nations Studies
- General Arts
- International Studies
- Human Resources Administration
- Not-for-Profit Management
- Psychology
- Social Work
- Wildlife Management

== See also ==
- List of institutes and colleges in British Columbia
- List of universities in British Columbia
- Higher education in British Columbia
- Education in Canada
