= Piapot =

Plains Cree chief (died 1908)

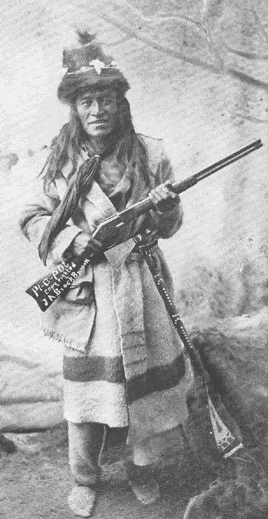
Piapot in studio pose circa 1885 – Saskatchewan Archives

Piapot (born Kisikawasan; c. 1816 – April 1908) was a Native Canadian chief of the Young Dogs Band, a mighty band and division of the Māmihkiyiniwak (Downstream People) of the Plains Cree. He was one of the five major leaders of the Plains Cree after 1860.

His name is sometimes spelled Payipwât or Payipwat.

== Early life ==
Most likely born near what is now the border of Manitoba and Saskatchewan, Piapot was originally named Kisikawasan, or Flash in the Sky. Along with his grandmother, he was kidnapped by the Sioux as a child. He grew up among his captors, learning their medicine. At fourteen, he was captured during a Cree raid and returned to his own people. He was given the name Piapot, literally "Hole in the Sioux", in recognition of the knowledge he had gained while living among the Sioux. His name is often translated as "One Who Knows the Secrets of the Sioux".

== Invasion of Cypress Hills ==
By 1860 Piapot had become a spiritual leader among the Cree. At the same time, he had become chief of the Cree-Assiniboine, or Young Dogs, a particularly powerful mixed band of Cree and Cree-speaking Assiniboine as well as some Plains Ojibwe. This band was known by the Cree as Nēhiyawi-pwātak (Cree-Assiniboine) and by the Assiniboine as Sahiyaiyeskabi or šahíya iyéskabina ("Cree-Speakers", because they had switched to speaking Cree). Members of the band were renowned as great buffalo hunters and warriors, as well as horse-thieves and troublemakers. As his band depended on the declining buffalo herds, Piapot advocated for the Cree to expand their territory into the Cypress Hills. Piapot was an important leader of the ensuing invasion; however, in a dream, he had a vision of Cree defeat. He was unable to persuade the other leaders of his vision, but he refused to participate in the battle the next day in which the Cree attacked a Kainai village. The "Battle of the Belly River" was disastrous for the Cree, who lost a third of their warriors, and essentially marked the end of the invasion.

He was known by his Assiniboine allies as Maȟpíya owáde hókši (Lightning In The Sky Boy).

== Treaty 4 ==
In 1875 Piapot met with William J. Christie, Canadian treaty commissioner. Christie wanted Piapot to sign Treaty 4, which had been negotiated a year earlier. Piapot demanded several changes to the treaty and, incorrectly believing that they had been made, signed it on September 9, 1875. Although many of his requests were provided by the government as part of future treaties (particularly Treaty 6), several were not. Until his death, Piapot felt betrayed by Ottawa.

Over the next decade Piapot continued to negotiate with the Canadian government. He and other Cree leaders refused to sign any additional treaties unless the Crown guaranteed the autonomy of the Cree people and grant them a united territory. When it became clear that this would not happen, Piapot, Cree leaders Cowessess and Foremost Man, and the Assiniboine First Nations all requested reserves in the Cypress Hills. The requested territories were all adjacent, and Ottawa agreed to the request, effectively granting the tribe the united territory it sought.

== Rebellion ==
In 1882, facing starvation due to the declining buffalo herds, Piapot and the Young Dogs agreed to leave the Cypress Hills in exchange for food, horses and supplies. However they returned in short order. The next year he again agreed to leave, this time to Indian Head, Assiniboia, and was escorted there by the North-West Mounted Police.

Once he arrived in Indian Head, Piapot immediately set about organizing his people again with the goal of establishing their own territory. Piapot again achieved some success. He gained permission to establish a new reserve immediately adjacent to another existing Cree reserve. He joined with other leaders of tribes subject to Treaties 4 and 6 to pressure Ottawa for treaty revisions.

However, in 1885 the government exploited the Métis North-West Rebellion to crack down on the Cree. A military fort was established next to Piapot's reserve. Several other leaders were arrested as rebels. Piapot was the only leader to survive, and he was closely monitored by the police and military.

== Later years ==
Piapot continued to be a respected spiritual leader among the Cree and continued to advocate for greater autonomy and promote the preservation of Cree culture. He was distrusted by the government.

In 1902 Indian Agent William Morris Graham attempted to have Piapot deposed as chief for incompetence. He eventually succeeded when he had the chief arrested for holding a Thirst Dance, a ceremony which had been banned in 1892. On April 15, 1902, the federal government removed Piapot as chief. Piapot met with Governor General Lord Minto in September of that year. The Governor General was persuaded to advocate for the lifting of the ban on the dances, but was unsuccessful.

In April 1908, Piapot died on his reserve.
