= Jenu =

Giant in Mi'kmaq folklore

In Miꞌkmaq folklore, a Jenu is a wild and cannibalistic hairy giant.

Jenu are created when a human "allows ice into their heart". The transformation is said take place over multiple days, and includes both physical changes as well as a growing hunger for flesh. Many of the afflicted either die or are abandoned by their families during the process.

Once transformed, Jenu appear hairy and emaciated, with bones poking through the skin. They will eat anything, but prefer to hunt humans. Jenu are most active during the winter because humans move less and are easier to hunt. They will fight each other over prey, with the winner getting the bone marrow. Jenu are said to carry large clubs with them as they hunt.

Jenua are comparable to the Wendigo of Anishinaabe and Cree mythology (and, to a lesser extent, Sasquatch).
