= Vancouver Métis Community Association =

Métis community organization in Canada

Vancouver Métis Community Association is a Métis community organization in Vancouver, British Columbia. The organization was established in 1995 as the Vancouver Métis Association by Dr. Howard Adams.

They are a community of social activists whose definition is:

A Full Métis is a person of Aboriginal Ancestry, who:

a) Declares him/herself to be Métis; and can provide proof of his/her Métis ancestry, or,

b) Has traditionally held him/herself out to be Métis, and has been recognized by this community at large as Métis.

In November 2003 the name was changed to the Vancouver Métis Community Association.

They are also responsible for the formation of The Walk Bravely Forward Society, a regional charitable organization which assists incarcerated Aboriginal offenders as they transition to community life.

The VMCA encourages education, arts and culture and were key in the development of the Aboriginal Voices Radio Network and made a presentation at CRTC public hearings regarding this in the year 2000.

Several VMCA members produced a half-hour documentary about Métis Elders called Not Just A Half Breed which has been running on the Aboriginal People's Television Network (APTN), and a copy of which is now housed in the Smithsonian Institution in Washington, DC.
