= First Nation–municipal service agreement =

A First Nation–municipal service agreement is an agreement (either formal or informal) between a First Nation and a municipality whereby one government purchases municipal services from the other. First Nation–municipal service agreements may also refer to jointly funded and operated services.

The Department of Indigenous Services refers to First Nation–municipal service agreements as municipal-type agreements (MTA) or municipal-type service agreements (MTSA). According to AANDC, MTAs can be agreements between two First Nations or between a First Nation and provincial government, municipal government, private contractor, Crown Corporation, individual or an organization that involves the provision of municipal services.

== Types ==
First Nations and municipalities are able to cooperate on a wide range of local services as both levels of government are responsible for providing similar services to their community members.

=== Hard Services ===
Hard services usually refer to infrastructure intensive and tend to be more costly due to higher operation and maintenance costs. They include, but are not limited to: potable water provision, wastewater collection and treatment, municipal solid waste collection and landfill usage, and fire protection services.

=== Soft Services ===
Soft services encompass a wide range of municipal services which are less infrastructure intensive. These include but are not limited to: animal control officer, road maintenance, building inspection, policing, emergency response, parks, libraries, and community buildings.

=== Comprehensive Service Agreements ===
Comprehensive service agreements are First Nation–municipal service agreements which incorporate multiple hard and soft services into a single agreement. Comprehensive agreements are a common strategy to provide regionally integrated for urban Indian reserves. Comprehensive agreements are also common in British Columbia in cases where an Indian reserve is adjacent to a regional district.

== Benefits ==
=== Economies of scale ===
In cases where a small community is receiving services from a large community, economies of scale allow for the purchaser to receive high-quality services which would have been too costly if pursued individually. First Nations and municipalities may also decide to partner as joint funders of an infrastructure project or local service which would not be financially feasible individually.

=== Increased capacity ===
For the purchaser of services, service agreements can be an effective way to avoid interacting directly with the regulatory environment (example: drinking water quality standards) for low-capacity communities. In many cases, a diminished responsibility in these matters means municipal government or First Nations staff may focus on other local issues.

== Barriers ==
=== Legislative challenges ===
First Nations and municipalities represent different orders of government. Municipalities operate under provincial legislation and First Nations operate under federal law even though many of their responsibilities to their community members are similar. Some examples include: different drinking water quality standards, differing powers to implement bylaws, and varying land management authorities. These realities can complicate cooperation on local services but, if dealt with in a transparent manner, do not limit communities’ ability to enter into service agreements.

=== Political turnover ===
Because First Nations and municipalities operate under differing legislation, First Nations and municipalities have different election cycles for local representatives. This can present a unique set of barriers for community partnerships. Political turnover can cause a change in local priorities, lack of established interpersonal relationships between municipal councils and Band councils and lack of organizational memory regarding service agreements and relationship building efforts.

=== Capacity ===
Lack of capacity can be a barrier in two ways: communities may have limited infrastructure capacity or limited human resource capacity.

Limited infrastructure capacity could present a barrier, particularly when thinking about water and wastewater service agreements. For example, an older treatment facility may have the capacity to provide only for the current population of a municipality or a First Nation and would not have the capacity to provide for both communities over the remaining lifespan of the facility.

Human capacity can also be a barrier because service agreements require a significant time investment by both communities to build relationships, discuss legal implications, and work through technical concerns surrounding infrastructure and service provision. Often small communities which may have limited human resources will find this to be a challenge.

== Trends ==
British Columbia has the largest number of Indian reserves in Canada and the largest number of First Nation–municipal service agreements compared to any other province. Civic Info BC has a number of sample First Nation–municipal agreements available on their website for public access.

Ontario has the second largest number of First Nations in Canada and has the second highest number of First Nation–municipal service agreements. The majority of agreements are related to fire protection and municipal solid waste.

Saskatchewan, since adopting a process of Treaty Land Entitlement (TLE) in the province, has seen an increase in the number of Urban Indian reserves. Since these parcels of land are purchased within municipal boundaries, comprehensive service agreements are usually adopted so there is no interruption in quantity or quality of service provision. Service agreements for Urban Indian reserves are regarded as mutually beneficial as the First Nation is able to access services at a low cost due to economies of scale and municipalities do not experience the impacts the loss of municipal land subject to property tax. The City of Saskatoon is an example of a municipality which is involved in multiple comprehensive First Nation–municipal service agreements for Urban Indian reserves.
