= R v Gonzales =

R. v. Gonzales (1962), 37 C.R. 56, was a landmark decision by the British Columbia Court of Appeal holding that Section 94(a) of the Indian Act did not violate the respondent's equality before the law, guaranteed under section 1(b) of the Canadian Bill of Rights, because all Indians were treated in the same way. Gonzales is particularly famous for employing the similarly situated test, which was not used in R. v. Drybones and was explicitly rejected by the Supreme Court of Canada in Andrews v. Law Society of British Columbia.

== See also ==
- R. v. Drybones
- Andrews v. Law Society of British Columbia
- The Canadian Crown and First Nations, Inuit and Métis
- Canadian Aboriginal case law
- Numbered Treaties
- Indian Act
- Section Thirty-five of the Constitution Act, 1982
- Indian Health Transfer Policy (Canada)
