= Gradual Civilization Act =

1857 Act for the enfranchisement of Canadian Indians

Parliament of the Province of Canada
- Long title: An Act to encourage the gradual Civilization of the Indian Tribes in this Province, and to amend the Laws relating to Indians
- Enacted by: Parliament of the Province of Canada
- Assented to: June 10, 1857

The Act to Encourage the Gradual Civilization of Indian Tribes in this Province, and to Amend the Laws Relating to Indians (commonly known as the Gradual Civilization Act) was a bill passed by the 5th Parliament of the Province of Canada in 1857. The act established a voluntary process through which any recognized male Indian (indigenous person) could apply to become "enfranchised", wherein they would lose their legal "Indian status" and become a regular British subject. Applications were open to those fluent in English or French, with approval subject to assessment by a committee of non-Indigenous reviewers. Enfranchised Indians would be granted an allotment of land and the ability to vote.

The statute built on a century of Imperial British legislation of American Indian rights, that had begun with the Royal Proclamation of 1763 and its protection of defined Indian lands. Starting in the 1830s, the British had introduced policies promoting the "civilizing" of Indians living in Canada, placing them on protected reserves where they were taught European skills, values, and religion. The aim of the act of 1857 was to enable the "complete assimilation" of the Indians into broader settler society, through enfranchisement.

The act's policies of enfranchisement and individual allotment of land by the colonial government impeded on the Indian tribal councils' right to self-governance. In response, councils resisted the enfranchisement of their tribe's members and lobbied for the act to be repealed, although these campaigns were unsuccessful. Ultimately, only one Indian was enfranchised under the act.

The act was updated by the 1869 Gradual Enfranchisement Act of the post-Confederation Dominion of Canada. Policies from both of these acts were incorporated into the Indian Act of 1876, which still governs the legal relationship between the Canadian government and First Nations peoples, albeit with numerous amendments.

== Background ==
=== Early British-Indian relations ===
Imperial Britain's first policies concerning American Indian lands and rights emerged in the mid-18th century, in response to the need for military allies against France and its competing colonial interests in North America. The British government recognised the tensions created by colonial encroachment on Indian land when this led to the Mohawk declaring the Covenant Chain, a symbol of the alliance built between the British and the Iroquois Confederacy over the preceding century, broken in 1753. The loss of this strategic ally posed a significant threat to Britain's military position in North America, becoming a major concern with the outbreak of the French and Indian War in 1754.

When colonial governments failed to restore the relationship with the Iroquois, Britain made diplomacy with American Indians an imperial responsibility in 1755, creating the British Indian Department. The department appointed superintendents responsible for the protection of Indian lands and the regulation of trade between Indians and often exploitative colonials, and provided regular gifts to tribes to gain favour. These policies convinced the Iroquois to re-align with the British and contribute to their war effort in the French and Indian War. Britain's eventual victory resulted in its acquisition of the vast majority of France's North American territory under the Treaty of Paris (1763).

The Royal Proclamation of 1763 formalised the department's protective policies as imperial British law and established the land west of the Appalachian Mountains as an Indian reserve, while also outlining a process through which the government could purchase Indian land through treaty agreements. The Royal Proclamation cemented a "nation-to-nation" diplomatic relationship between Britain and its Indian allies, based on protection and conciliation. The tribes maintained their allegiance throughout the American Revolutionary War, leading to the loss of their traditional lands upon Britain's defeat in 1781; in response, Britain provided land within its remaining North American territories (the British Canadas) for its Indian allies to resettle.

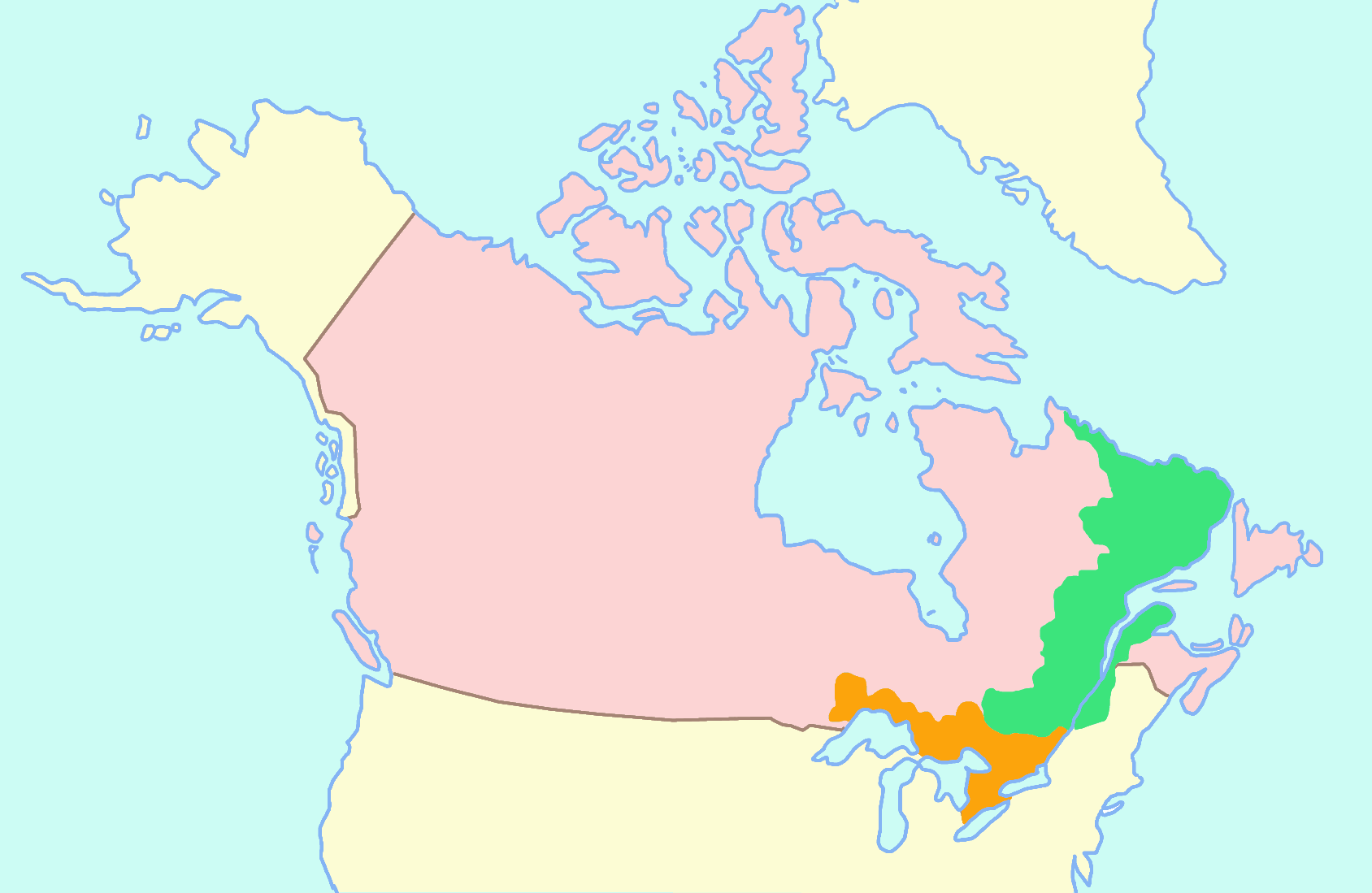
The British Canadas prior to 1809, showing Lower Canada (green) and Upper Canada (orange), compared to present-day Canada (pink).

=== Creation of Indian reserves ===
From 1815 onwards, imperial Britain's political stance towards American Indians expanded beyond protection and began to incorporate the objective of 'civilization'. Driven by Protestant sects in the colonies and Britain, a growing ideological movement emphasised the government's responsibility to 'civilise' the Indians, which would entail both their conversion to Christianity and their adoption of European cultural and societal values. This political pressure led to the creation of Indian reserves in Upper and Lower Canada in 1830, where Indians would be trained in farming practices and technical skills, receive an English education, and become Christianised through the work of missionaries.

The Act for the Protection of the Indians in Upper Canada (1839) classified the reserves as Crown lands. In 1850, further protective acts were passed in both Upper and Lower Canada: Indians living on reserves were designated as exempt from taxation, and colonials were prohibited from trespassing on Indian lands or seizing them in the case of unpaid debts. In the act for Lower Canada, a legislative precedent was set as the government instituted a legal definition of 'Indian status' for the first time.

=== Political rationale for enfranchisement ===
By 1857, Canadian politicians and Indian Department officials were "becoming impatient" with the progress of the Indians living on reserves, with the colonial government facing increasing pressure from Britain to reduce the costs associated with Indian administration. Two influential commissions into Indian policy, the 1844 Bagot Commission and the 1856 Pennefather Commission, had asserted that individual property ownership and enfranchisement would provide the Indians with the motivation to achieve self-sufficiency and become 'civilised' members of colonial society. Multiple scholars agree that these commissions precipitated a shift in the goal of British Indian policy: from the protection of Indians as a separate people, to their total assimilation into the settler population. This objective was entrenched in law with the passing of the Gradual Civilization Act in 1857, establishing a legal process through which reserve Indians could become enfranchised and receive an individual allotment of land.

== Policies of the act ==
The act's opening preamble stated its intended purpose as enabling the assimilation of Indian persons through voluntary enfranchisement.

Whereas it is desirable to encourage the progress of Civilization among the Indian Tribes in this Province, and the gradual removal of all legal distinctions between them and Her Majesty's other Canadian Subjects, and to facilitate the acquisition of property and of the rights accompanying it, by such Individual Members of the said Tribes as shall be found to desire such encouragement...

— Gradual Civilization Act

=== 'Indian status' ===
Sections 1 and 2 of the act provided a legal definition of an 'Indian', and declared that this status would be removed upon enfranchisement. Qualification as a 'status Indian' required that a person had Indian ancestry or was married to someone with such ancestry, held membership in a recognised Indian band, and lived on the lands of that band. An 'enfranchised Indian' would lose this status and the unique legal rights that came with it. The act specifically cited the exemption for Indians from debt repayments to non-Indians, enacted by the 1850 Act for the protection of the Indians in Upper Canada, as no longer applying after enfranchisement.

=== Process of enfranchisement ===
Section 3 of the act outlined the conditions that needed to be met by Indians applying for enfranchisement, as well as how their applications would be assessed. Only men over the age of 21 could apply - they would then be examined by a Committee composed of their tribe's Superintendent (an Indian Department official), a missionary, and another appointed non-Indian. The commissioners were instructed to approve applicants that were literate in English or French, "sufficiently" educated, "of good moral character", and debt-free. With this approval, an Indian would be officially enfranchised by the federal government.

Section 4 outlined a modified process available for Indian men (aged 21 to 40) who were illiterate but could speak English or French. If a Committee deemed such a man to be "of sober and industrious habits", "sufficiently intelligent", and free of debt, he would be placed on a three-year probation. If he "conducted himself to [the Committee's] satisfaction" during this probation, he could then be officially enfranchised.

An enfranchised Indian would be required to choose a last name (to be approved by the commissioners) by which he would become legally known. The Superintendent General of Indian affairs would then allocate him up to 50 acres (20ha) of land from his band's reserve, as well as a lump sum payment "equal to the principal of his share of the annuities and other yearly revenues" received by the band. This land and money would become the man's individual property. However, he would no longer be considered a member of the band, and therefore forfeited any claim to its lands or revenues in the future.

=== Gender discrimination ===
Several of the act's sections established the rights of Indian women as different from men in regard to the process of enfranchisement. Women were not allowed to voluntarily apply. Instead, if a woman's husband became enfranchised, she would be automatically enfranchised alongside him. Her band membership could then only be regained through remarriage to a status Indian.

An enfranchised woman would not receive any reserve land, and if her husband died she would only receive his land if he had no descendants. While enfranchised women were entitled to their share of band revenues, unlike men they would not receive this in lump sum. A woman's share would be "held in trust" by the Indian Department, which would then pay her yearly interest.

== Effects ==
=== Impact on Indian rights ===
The Royal Proclamation of 1763 had established Indian control over their own lands as a constitutional right - Indian tribes were treated as sovereign nations whose land could only be acquired through formal treaty agreements. However, the Gradual Civilization Act allowed the provision of reserve lands to enfranchised Indians by the Indian Department, without the consent of the relevant council. This superseded the constitutional principle of tribal self-governance that had existed since 1763.

The act furthered the trend, initiated in Lower Canadian legislature in 1850, of the colonial government deciding who qualified as an Indian. The act's legal definition of a 'status Indian' replaced the traditional "community-based and self-identification approach" of the Indian tribes. The act also introduced a mechanism for the government to reduce the number of Indians with this status: enfranchisement would mean the loss of 'Indian status' for the man that applied, his wife, and all his future descendants.

The act's policies discriminated based on gender, providing Indian women with less rights than Indian men. Women were given no legal autonomy over the society and culture they belonged to - if their husband was enfranchised, a woman was automatically enfranchised and lost her 'Indian status'. Kirkby claims this "reflected Victorian discourses of masculinity as a natural patriarchy", with women being treated as "dependents" by the colonial government.

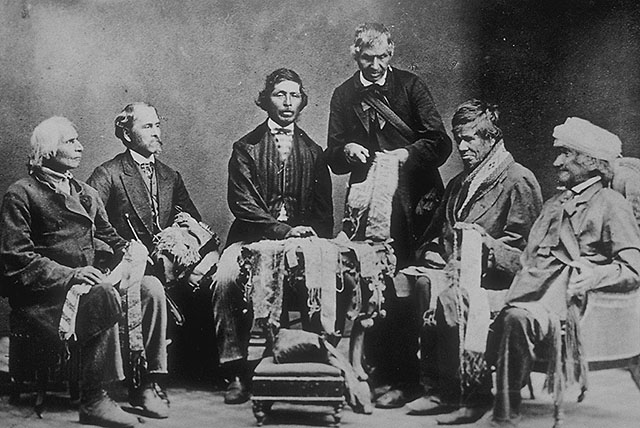
Iroquois Chiefs of the Six Nations Confederacy in 1871

=== Reception by tribal councils ===
Prior to the act, the tribal councils and colonial government had a "progressive and cooperative" diplomatic relationship. The councils worked with Indian Department officials and missionaries to improve the quality of life and "self-sufficiency" of Indian reserves, collaborating on the construction of infrastructure such as schools and roads. However, band councils had maintained full legal control over their reserves' land and inhabitants, under the principles of the Royal Proclamation of 1763.

Following the act's enactment, many of the tribal councils announced their disapproval of its policies, recognising that enfranchisement and the individual allotment of reserve land violated their constitutional right to exclusive control over their lands and people. Tribal leaders stated that the act was designed to "break [us] into pieces" and "separate our peoples". Milloy claims that government officials came to be viewed as "aggressive and disruptive agents of assimilation".

The Confederacy Council of the Six Nations and various other councils launched petitions calling for the act to be repealed, and declared that they would not sell any more Indian land through treaty agreements. In 1860, the Confederacy Council sent a representative to appeal to the Prince of Wales, Edward VII, who was on a tour of British Canada. The Council argued that it was a "loyal ally and... peer of the British Crown", and any laws detracting from their legal autonomy broke this "sacred alliance". Ultimately, none of the campaigns to repeal the act were successful.

=== Applicants for enfranchisement ===
The strong resistance of tribal governments led to very few Indians pursuing the voluntary enfranchisement offered by the act. In the Grand River Reserve of the Six Nations Confederacy, three Mohawk men applied within the first year of the act's passing. A committee consisting of an Indian Department superintendent, a missionary, and a local businessman approved only one of these applicants, Elias Hill, after he successfully recited the catechism and the names of the world's seven continents - a "civilization test... invented on the spot". Hill was the only Indian enfranchised under the act before its consolidation into the Indian Act of 1876. The Confederacy Council refused to acknowledge his enfranchisement for three decades, eventually granting him a cash payment in place of the reserve lands promised by the act.

=== Influence on later legislation ===
The act of 1857 set legal and political precedents for later legislation by the government of the new Dominion of Canada. Milloy claims that the act marked a change in the fundamental political ideology behind the government's legal treatment of Indians: the goal of 'civilization' changed to mean the total absorption of their lands and peoples into colonial society, as opposed to their development as a separate culture. The act established enfranchisement as the process through which this "eradication" could be achieved, leading to the expansion of this process in the Gradual Enfranchisement Act of 1869 and the Indian Act of 1876.

Department officials and missionaries blamed the failure of the act (with only one successful enfranchisement) on the resistance of tribal councils, and mounted a political campaign against Indian self-governance in the 1860s. They argued that tribal authorities were "the major block on the road to civilization". The Gradual Civilization Act had already granted the colonial government the ability to interfere with Indian governance over their lands, with its provision for individual allotment of reserve lands to enfranchised Indians. The Gradual Enfranchisement Act expanded on this precedent, giving the Canadian government the power to veto any and all legal decisions made by tribal councils. The later Indian Act passed complete control of Indian governance over to the Parliament of Canada.

== See also ==
- Cultural assimilation of Native Americans
- Indian Act
- Macaulayism
- Code de l'Indigénat – a set of French colonial laws with a similar goal
- Aboriginal Protection Act of Australia, 1869
