= Canada (AG) v Lavell =

1974 Supreme Court of Canada case

- Supreme Court of Canada

Hearing: February 22, 23, 26, 27, 1973 Judgment: August 27, 1973
- Full case name: The Attorney General of Canada v. Jeannette Vivian Corbiere Lavell; Richard Isaac, Leonard Staats, Clarence Jamieson, Rena Hill, Norman Lickers, William White, Nina Burnham, John Capton, Howard Lickers, Clifford Lickers, Mitchell Sandy, Ronald Monture, Gordon Hill, Sydney Henhawk, Ross Powless, Victor Porter, Frank Monture, Renson Jamieson and Vincent Sandy v. Yvonne Bédard
- Citations: (1973), 38 D.L.R. (3d) 481, 23 C.R.N.S. 197, 11 R.F.L. 333, [1974] S.C.R. 1349.
- Prior history: Judgment for Lavell in the Federal Court of Appeal; Judgment for Bédard in the Supreme Court of Ontario
- Ruling: Appeals allowed.

Holding
- Section 12(1)(b) of the Indian Act does not violate the right to equality before the law and the protection of the law, as guaranteed under Section 1 (b) of the Canadian Bill of Rights, and is therefore not inoperative.

Court membership
- Chief Justice: Gérald Fauteux; Puisne Justices: Douglas Abbott, Ronald Martland, Wilfred Judson, Roland Ritchie, Emmett Hall, Wishart Spence, Louis-Philippe Pigeon, Bora Laskin

Reasons given
- Plurality: Ritchie J., joined by Fauteux C.J., and Martland and Judson JJ.
- Concurrence: Pigeon J.
- Dissent: Abbott J.
- Dissent: Laskin J., joined by Hall and Spence JJ.

Laws applied
- Canadian BilI of Rights, R.S.C. 1970, App. III; Indian Act, R.S.C. 1970, c. I-6.

Canada (AG) v Lavell, [1974] S.C.R. 1349, was a landmark 5–4 Supreme Court of Canada decision holding that Section 12(1)(b) of the Indian Act did not violate the respondents' right to "equality before the law" under Section 1 (b) of the Canadian Bill of Rights. The two respondents, Lavell and Bédard, had alleged that the impugned section was discriminatory under the Canadian Bill of Rights by virtue of the fact that it deprived Indian women of their status for marrying a non-Indian, but not Indian men.

The Supreme Court's decision proved very controversial, later influencing the wording of Section 15 of the Canadian Charter of Rights and Freedoms during the drafting process.

== Background to Mrs. Lavell ==
Mrs. Lavell, a member of Wiikwemkoong First Nation, married David Lavell, a journalism student at Ryerson Polytechnical Institute in Toronto, on April 11, 1970. She was promptly delivered a notice from the Department of Indian Affairs and Northern Development indicating that due to her marriage to a person not registered as Indian, she would no longer be considered an Indian by law. On December 7, 1970, the Indian Registrar deleted her name from the Registry in accordance with Section 12(1)(b) of the Indian Act. Mrs. Lavell disputed her loss of status to the registrar, but without success.

At Mrs. Lavell's request for judicial review of the Registrar's decision, Mrs. Lavell's case was referred to Judge B.W. Grossberg of the York County Court as per section 9(3) of the Indian Act. Mrs. Lavell argued that Section 12(1)(b) of the Indian Act was inoperative due to an irreconcilable abridgement of her right to equality before the law, guaranteed by the Canadian Bill of Rights. In particular, Mrs. Lavell asserted that the Indian Act discriminated against Indian women since only they lost their status as an Indian under the Act, whereas Indian men could marry whomever they so desired without adverse legal consequence. The decision of registrar, she argued, must therefore be reversed.

In the case's proceedings, counsel for the Attorney General of Canada presented evidence to the court demonstrating that Mrs. Lavell had not lived on a single reserve for a period of nine years before her marriage and that she had only made a few "sporadic" visits to her family. Furthermore, counsel argued that as far as the law was concerned, the Indian Act did not discriminate against Indian women. In defence of this proposition, counsel noted that the Supreme Court has rejected the 'similarly situated doctrine' as the appropriate measure of a party's equality before the law. The appellant, Mrs. Lavell, therefore, counsel for the Attorney General argued, must be compared not to married Indian men, but to all married Canadian women in order to establish whether or not discrimination has in fact occurred by reason of sex.

=== Judgement of Judge B. W. Grossberg as persona designata (York County Court) ===
Grossberg affirmed and upheld the Registrar's decision, holding that the impugned Section of the Indian Act did not discriminate against the appellant on the basis of sex. Judge Grossberg noted that the Indian Act treated all married women equally, Indian or not:

The appellant entered into a voluntary marriage which gave her the status and all the rights enjoyed by all other Canadian married females. Her marriage also imposed on her the same obligations imposed on all other Canadian married females ...

Judge Grossberg also dismissed the appellant's arguments regarding the different distinctions between male and female Indians, stating that he had difficulty fathoming how such alleged inequalities within different groups of Canadian society are necessarily offensive to the Canadian Bill of Rights. As a matter of fact, Judge Grossberg suggests that it is a laudable point in Canadian history that the appellant is no longer an Indian, since she now she enjoys the same rights and freedoms of all Canadians; a feat which he construes as consistent to the recommendations of the "Report of the Royal Commission on the Status of Women in Canada".

To that end Section 12(1)(b) of the Indian Act, the Judge concludes, is not inoperative in the face of the Canadian Bill of Rights.

=== Judgement of the Federal Court of Appeal ===
Mrs. Lavell appealed Judge Grossberg's decision to the Federal Court of Appeal, arguing that Judge Grossberg erred in his determination that the impugned Section of the Indian Act was not in violation of the appellant's right to equality before the law.

Mr. Justice Thurlow, writing for a unanimous court, agreed, declaring the impugned section discriminatory on the basis of sex. Citing the Supreme Court of Canada's decision in Drybones, Justice Thurlow rejected the reasoning of Judge Grossberg that since all women, Canadian and Indian, were being treated the same under the Act that there was no deprivation of the appellant's equality before the law. Rather, Justice Thurlow determines that in order for the Indian Act to respect the equality of the appellants, the law must treat Indian women by the same fashion as it treats Indian men: as equals. Section 12(1)(b) of the Indian Act, Justice Thurlow reasons, does not treat Indian women in such a manner:

It is clear that both male Indians and female Indians have capacity to marry and that each has the capacity and the right to contract a marriage either with another Indian or with a person who is not an Indian. The Indian Act, however, which is a law made by the Parliament of Canada for Indians, prescribes a different result with respect to the rights of an Indian woman who marries a person other than an Indian, or an Indian of another band, from that which is to obtain when a male Indian marries a person other than an Indian, or an Indian who is a member of another band.

Justice Thurlow also noted that should a male Indian marry a non-Indian, not only will his legal status as an Indian remain unchanged, the Indian Act also provides that his wife may also be registered as an Indian.

Being of the opinion that the Court could not apply the Indian Act in the case at bar without infringing the appellant's rights under the Canadian Bill of Rights, Justice Thurlow declared the impugned provision inoperative.

== Background to Mrs. Bédard ==
Yvonne Bédard was born in the Six Nations Indian Reserve in Brantford as a member of the Iroquois Nation. In May 1964, Mrs. Bédard married a non-Indian, begetting two children with him. Mrs. Bédard and her spouse lived together off the Reserve until June 23, 1970, when they separated. Mrs. Bédard returned with her two children to the Reserve to live in a house bequeathed to her by her mother, Carrie Williams. Since Mrs Bédard had married a non-Indian, she was no longer listed in the Registry as an Indian. When she began to occupy the house on the reserve, the Six Nations Band Council passed a resolution ordering Mrs. Bédard to dispose of the property within the next six months, during which time she could live there. The Council later adopted two additional resolutions allowing Mrs. Bédard to live in the house for another six months, and then another two months, but no longer than that. In order to act in accordance with the council's resolutions, Mrs. Bédard eventually transferred ownership of the property to her brother (a registered member of the Band) who was granted a Certificate of Possession of the property on March 15, 1971, by the Minister of Indian Affairs as required by the Indian Act. Mrs. Bédard and her children, with her brother's consent, remained to occupy the premises without rent. On September 15, 1971, the Six Nations Band Council passed Resolution 15, requesting the Brantford District Supervisor to serve notice to Mrs. Bédard that she shall quit the Reserve. Mrs. Bédard would later lose her status as an Indian shortly after taking the Six Nations Band Council to Court, slightly before she could deliver her statement of claim against the council.

After the Six Nations Band Council passed Resolution 15, Mrs. Bédard immediately sought an injunction in court to enjoin her expulsion from the Reserve as well as an order setting aside Resolution 15, passed by the Band Council. The motion for an injunction was later withdrawn in court, with Mrs. Bédard's counsel agreeing that only a declaratory relief against the Six Nations Band Council would be sought.

Mrs. Bédard argued that the Band Council's resolution, authorizing that a request be made to the District Supervisor to expel her from the Reserve, and any action taken in accordance with such a request by the District Supervisor, as well as the removal of her name from the Band Registry because of her marriage to a non-Indian constituted discrimination on the basis of sex and race viz-à-viz her right to the "enjoyment of property, and the right not to be deprived thereof except by due process of law", guaranteed by Section 1(a) of the Canadian Bill of Rights. Therefore, she asserted, it follows that the Band Council's actions are without force or effect.

The Band Council, the defendants in the case, argued, by contrary, that not every distinction is necessarily discriminatory. Only those distinctions which are adverse to the group with which they are being made can be categorized as discrimination as used in the Canadian Bill of Rights. To that end, the defendant is given "some advantages elsewhere in the Act" with which do not apply to male Indians, and thus compensates for certain disadvantages she may experience.

=== Judgement of the Ontario Supreme Court ===
Judge Osler, in his reasons for judgement, held that Section 12(1)(b) is inoperative by virtue of the Canadian Bill of Rights. The judge rejected the reasoning of the defendant that such "disadvantages" produced by the Indian Act can be "compensated" for by other provisions which favour Indian women. The distinction made by the Indian Act, he asserts, whether the said distinction must be adverse or not to constitute discrimination, is clearly adverse toward the plaintiff to constitute discrimination:

it is perfectly apparent that the loss of status as an Indian and the loss of the right to be registered and to occupy property upon a reserve is discrimination which is adverse to the interest of Indian women ...

With respect to the Federal Court of Appeal's decision in Re Lavell and Attorney General of Canada, he holds that it is not binding as a matter of stare decisis. Judge Osler, however, held it of persuasive value which, in light of the reasons given by the Supreme Court of Canada in Drybones, he found correct as a matter of law. In particular, he agreed that since Indian women obtain a different result for marrying a non-Indian spouse, it is "plainly discrimination by reason of sex with respect to the rights of an individual to the enjoyment of property".

Therefore, pursuant to the Supreme Court of Canada's decision in Drybones, Osler held that it is "the duty of the Court ... to declare s. 12(1)(b) of the Indian Act inoperative", which he did, declaring all actions of the Band Council and the District Supervisor in accordance with the impugned provision to be of no effect.

== Judgement of the Supreme Court of Canada ==
The cases of both Mrs. Lavell and Mrs. Bédard's cases were appealed to the Supreme Court of Canada and were heard together.

In a 4–1–4 vote, the Supreme Court of Canada allowed the appeals, setting aside the respective judgements of the Ontario Supreme Court and Federal Court of Appeal.

=== Plurality opinion ===
Justice Ritchie, writing for the plurality (Fauteux C.J., Martland, Judson and Ritchie JJ.), held that the enfranchisement of Indian women for marrying a non-Indian, as devised under Section 12(1)(b) of the Indian Act, did not constitute a denial of the respondent's right to equality before the law. Hence, Ritchie did not find that the impugned Section of the Indian Act is inoperative. In the course of making this decision, Justice Ritchie addressed numerous questions of law as follows.

Firstly, Ritchie held that the Canadian Bill of Rights did not have the effect of rendering the entirety of the Indian Act inoperative because it deals solely with Indians (i.e. allegedly discrimination). Such a proposition, he argued, stands in contrast to the Court's jurisprudence and the very tenets of the common law, and dismissed it as a thinly veiled assault on the powers given exclusively to the Federal Parliament by the Constitution:

To suggest that the provisions of the Bill of Rights have the effect of making the whole Indian Act inoperative as discriminatory is to assert that the Bill [of Rights] has rendered Parliament powerless to exercise the authority entrusted to it under the constitution of enacting legislation which treats Indians living on Reserves differently from other Canadians in relation to their property and civil rights.

Ritchie argued that Parliament cannot properly exercise the powers vested in it, if it cannot define the qualifications required to be an Indian and to "use and benefit of Crown lands reserved for Indians". Also, citing the preamble to the Canadian Bill of Rights (which describes Parliament's intention to enact a Bill of Rights "which shall reflect the respect of Parliament for its constitutional authority"), it would appear, Ritchie asserted, that the Bill does not purport to "amend or alter the terms of the British North America Act". Moreover, Ritchie also noted that the majority in Drybones clearly disavowed of an approach that would render an entire Act inoperative because of a violation, which held instead that only the offending provision should be construed as inoperative.

Secondly, Ritchie also held that Parliament did not intend the Canadian Bill of Rights to fundamentally change or alter any constitutional scheme such as those contained in the Indian Act and, in particular, those provisions which constitute a "necessary structure . . . for the internal administration of the life of Indians on Reserves and their entitlement to the use and benefit of Crown lands"? It was a widely accepted convention, he argues, that an Act, in which Parliament exercises its constitutional functions, can only be changed or amended "by plain statutory language expressly enacted for the [that] purpose." With respect to this case, he contended that Parliament did not intend to amend the Indian Act with the "use of broad general language directed at the statutory proclamation of the fundamental rights and freedoms enjoyed by all Canadians . . . Citing the case of Barker v. Edger with approval and applying the Privy Council's reasoning in that case, Ritchie concluded that the Canadian Bill of Rights, likewise, did not and cannot amend the Indian Act. For good measure, Ritchie also noted that Justice Pigeon came to similar conclusion in Drybones.

Thirdly, Justice Ritchie also disagreed with the respondent's interpretation of Justice Laskin's opinion in Curr that a provision of a statute is inoperative purely on the basis of discrimination and that a violation of one of the rights and freedoms guaranteed by Section 1 of the Canadian Bill of Rights need not be established. Ritchie contends that Justice Laskin merely stated in his majority opinion that the rights guaranteed in paragraphs (a) to (f) (of Section 1) are guaranteed "irrespective of race, national origin, colour or sex." In other words, Section 1 rights are universal, which he argues is supported by the locution of the French version of the Bill of Rights. Furthermore, Ritchie held that the notion that the Bill of Rights prohibits discrimination alone does not comport with the purposes of the Bill of Rights, which are to guarantee that the rights and freedoms that are 'recognized and declared.' The right to be free of discrimination, he remarks, is not one of them per se.

Finally, Justice Ritchie held that the question of law that is applicable in the present case should be

... confined to deciding whether the Parliament of Canada in defining the prerequisites of Indian Status so as not to include women of Indian birth who have chosen to marry non-Indians, enacted a law which cannot be sensibly construed and applied without abrogating, abriding or infringing the rights of such women to equality before the law.

To that end, Ritchie held that the meaning of rights and freedoms in the Bill of Rights is exactly the same meaning "which it bore in Canada at the time when the Bill was enacted, and it follows that the phrase 'equality before the law' is to be construed in light of the law existing in Canada at that time." In Ritchie's opinion, 'equality before the law' cannot be construed as "the egalitarian concept exemplified by the 14th Amendment of the U.S. Constitution ... " Instead, citing the preamble of the Bill of Rights, Ritchie contended that 'equality before the law' should be construed in the context of the rule of law. Drawing from the writings of Dicey, Ritchie remarked that 'equality before the law' is described as an aspect of the rule of law that "carries the meaning of equal subjection of all classes to the ordinary law of the land as administered by the ordinary courts." Ritchie also extended this interpretation of 'equality before the law' to the "application of the law by law enforcement authorities."

Applying, this interpretation of 'equality before the law', Ritchie noted that the impugned scheme has been in force and effect since 1869, that is for at least a hundred years. Furthermore, Ritchie argued that a "careful reading" of the Indian Act reveals that the section held inoperative in Drybones was criminal legislation "exclusively concerned with behaviour of Indians off a Reserve", whereas Section 12(1)(b) is legislation "enacted as a part of the plan devised by Parliament, under s. 91(24) [of the British North America Act for the regulation of the internal domestic life of Indians on Reserves." Drybones, therefore, can be distinguished from this case, Ritchie argued, because the majority of the Court in Drybones held that the impugned section "could not be enforced without bring about inequality between one group of citizens and another and that this inequality was occasioned by reason of the race of the accused." This case, Ritchie noted, does not involve the criminal law; therefore, Drybones "can ... have no application to the present appeals".

As such, Ritchie concluded that there is no denial of "equality before the law", since "no such inequality is necessarily entailed in the construction and application of s. 12(1)(b)".

=== Concurring opinion ===
Justice Pigeon, in a concurring opinion, agreed with the result of the plurality. However, citing his dissent in Drybones, Pigeon chided the majority on the Court who would persist in giving the Bill of Rights "an invalidating effect over prior legislation". Pigeon asserted that the majority of the court which once disagreed with his dissent, "now adopt it for the main body of this important statute". It, therefore, he stated, "cannot be improper for me to adhere to what was my dissenting view".

Pigeon argued that the Canadian Bill of Rights need not have an invalidating effect, at all. He pointed out that there have been many cases in which a simple reinterpretation of the impugned legislation are "important illustration of the effectiveness of the Bill without any invalidating effect".

=== Dissenting opinions ===
The remaining four Justices dissented, rejecting the holding of the plurality that R v Drybones must be distinguished from the case at bar and Pigeon's opinion that the Canadian Bill of Rights cannot render a law inoperative by virtue of a violation of one of its enumerated rights.

==== Laskin ====
Writing also for Justices Hall and Spence, Justice Laskin wrote a strong dissent.

"It is", Justice Laskin wrote, "impossible to distinguish Drybones, which he has "no disposition to reject."

Justice Laskin argued that Drybones decided two things. First, Drybones decided that the Canadian Bill of Rights was "more than a mere interpretation statute whose terms would yield to a contrary intention." Rather, he stated, it is the provisions of the Canadian Bill of Rights that take precedence over the provisions of a conflicting federal statute. Secondly, Laskin stated that Drybones decided that the accused had been denied equality before the law on the basis that it was a criminal offence for him to do something, purely on the basis of his race.

Laskin contended that Justice Ritchie's own opinion in Drybones, the majority opinion, made it explicitly clear that a denial of a respondent's equality before the law was apparent because a distinction had been made solely on account of the respondent's race. In light of these reasons, Laskin asserted that it would be unprincipled for the Court to now construe Drybones as contingent solely on the basis that the impugned section of the Indian Act created a punishable criminal offence. "The gist of the judgement", Laskin wrote, "lay in the legal disability imposed upon a person by reason of his race when other persons were under no similar restraint." Since the impugned Section of the Indian Act imposes disabilities and prescribes disqualifications for members of the female sex that are not imposed upon members of the male sex in the same circumstances, Laskin argued that if the reasoning in Drybones was actually applied to the appeals the Court would have no choice but to find a denial of the respondents' equality before the law.

Furthermore, Laskin rejected the notion that a distinction on the basis of sex does not violate the Canadian Bill of Rights where that distinction is applicable only among Indians. On the contrary, he wrote, it is a notion "that compounds racial inequality even beyond the point that the Drybones case found unacceptable". Justice Laskin noted that "there is no absolute disqualification of an Indian woman from registrability on the Indian Register ... by marrying outside a Band unless the marriage is to a non-Indian".

Laskin also rejected the argument that "discrimination embodied in the Indian Act under s. 12(1)(b)" must be subject to a "reasonable classification test" (as adopted by the United States Supreme Court when dealing with similar violations under the Fifth Amendment) and that it is justified, as a reasonable classification, because the "paramount purpose of the [Indian] Act to preserve and protect the members of the race is promoted by the statutory preference for Indian men". Laskin declared that U.S. case law on the subject is "at best a marginal relevance" because of the limitations imposed on the judiciary by the Canadian Bill of Rights. Even if such a test had been applied, Laskin contended that it is dubious that discrimination on the basis of sex could be justified as a 'reasonable classification' when "it has no biological or physiological rationale". Moreover, Laskin did not accept the argument that a reasonable classification test can be incorporated into the right of equality before the law, since that would be precluded by "the telling words of s. 1, 'without discrimination by reason of race, national origin, colour, religion or sex." "In short," Laskin writes,

the proscribed s. 1 have a force either independent of the subsequently enumerated clauses (a) to (f) or, if they are found in any federal legislation, they offend those clauses because each must be read as if the prohibited forms of discrimination were recited therein as a part thereof.

Laskin argued that this view is largely manifested by and contained in Drybones and Curr.

In addition, Laskin asserted that the position taken by the appellants has no historical basis and even if it did, "history cannot avail against the clear words of ss. 1 and 2 of the Canadian Bill of Rights". Those sections, Laskin contended, makes it abundantly clear that the Canadian Bill of Rights does not contain purely declaratory provisions. Rather, Laskin held the Bill does not permit a violation of its provisions regardless of whether the impugned statute was enacted prior to or after the enactment of the Bill of Rights.

Finally, Laskin discarded the argument that the discrimination in question is not offensive to the Bill of Rights simply because Parliament enacted the impugned section of the law under its constitutional authority as provided by the British North America Act. "The majority opinion in the Drybones case", Laskin noted, "dispels any attempt to rely on the grant of legislative power as a ground for escaping from the force of the Canadian Bill of Rights." Laskin remarked that Section 3 of the Bill of Rights indeed affirms that its constitutional jurisdiction is not at issues when the Bill of Rights commands the Minister of Justice to evaluate every government bill to ensure consistency with the Bill of Rights.

==== Abbott ====
Writing for himself in a dissenting opinion, Abbott indicated his agreement with Justice Laskin that Drybones cannot be distinguished from the two cases under appeal. "In that case," Abbott wrote, "this Court rejected the contention that s. 1 of the Canadian Bill of Rights provided merely a canon of construction for the interpretation of legislation existing when the Bill was passed." Abbott declared that the plurality's interpretation of 'equality before the law' with respect to Dicey's writings, is therefore inappropriate. Abbott, furthermore, asserted that without giving effect to the words "without discrimination by reason of race, national origin, colour religion or sex" as used in section 1, the plurality has effectively deprived them of any significance as though they are "mere rhetorical window dressing."

Also, Justice Abbott took the opportunity to comment on the effect of the Bill of Rights, stating famously:

In my view the Canadian Bill of Rights has substantially affected the doctrine of the supremacy of Parliament. Like any other statute it can of course be repealed or amended, or a particular law declared to be applicable notwithstanding the provisions of the Bill. In form the supremacy of Parliament in maintained but in practice I think that it has been substantially curtailed. In my opinion that result is undesirable, but that is a matter for consideration by Parliament not the courts.

Finally, Justice Abbott held that he would have dismissed the appeal in favour of the respondents.

== Significance as precedent ==
=== Lavell's influence over the wording of the Canadian Charter of Rights and Freedoms ===
The plurality's decision in the case was very controversial and would prove influential in the drafting of the Canadian Charter of Rights and Freedoms, the successor of the Canadian Bill of Rights. Indeed, the Supreme Court's narrow and restrained interpretations of the Canadian Bill of Rights in cases like Lavell certainly reinforced the push for an entrenched bill of rights, like the Canadian Charter of Rights and Freedoms.

Section 15 of the October 1980 draft version of the Canadian Charter of Rights and Freedoms guaranteed:

15. (1) Everyone has the right to equality before the law and to the equal protection of the law without discrimination because of race, national or ethnic origin, colour, religion, age or sex.

(2) This Section does not preclude any law, program or activity that has as its object the amelioration of conditions of disadvantaged persons or groups.

In light of the plurality's decision of Lavell in which Justice Ritchie held that "equality before the law" required only the equal administration of the law and did not concern the actual substance of the law or require equal laws per se; Section 15(1) was later revised to include the concept of "equality under the law" to indicate that the equality guarantees are sufficiently broad to include a requirement of substantive equality.

=== Aftermath of Section 12(1)(b) of the Indian Act ===
The impact of Section 12(1)(b) of the Indian Act, which was upheld by the Supreme Court of Canada in Lavell, continued to have devastating consequences for women. Indian women who would later marry a non-Indian would lose their status as well as the children of the marriage. Furthermore, disenfranchised Indian women were prohibited from

- residing on their reserve
- inheriting family property
- receiving treaty benefits
- participating in band councils and other affairs of the Indian community
- being buried in cemeteries with their ancestors

That was in stark contrast to non-Indian women if they married Indian men since the former would gain Indian status.

According to the Royal Commission on the Status of Women, about 4,605 Indian women lost their Indian status by marrying white men between 1958 and 1968.

Section 12(1)(b) of the Indian Act was finally repealed in 1985 by the Parliament of Canada, after the United Nations International Human Rights Commission ruled that the removal of Indian status on account of sex was contrary to international law.

== See also ==
- R v Drybones
- The Canadian Crown and First Nations, Inuit and Métis
- Canadian Aboriginal case law
- Numbered Treaties
- Section Thirty-five of the Constitution Act, 1982
- Indian Health Transfer Policy (Canada)
- List of gender equality lawsuits
- Section Fifteen of the Canadian Charter of Rights and Freedoms
