= Gradual Enfranchisement Act =

Act of the Parliament of Canada

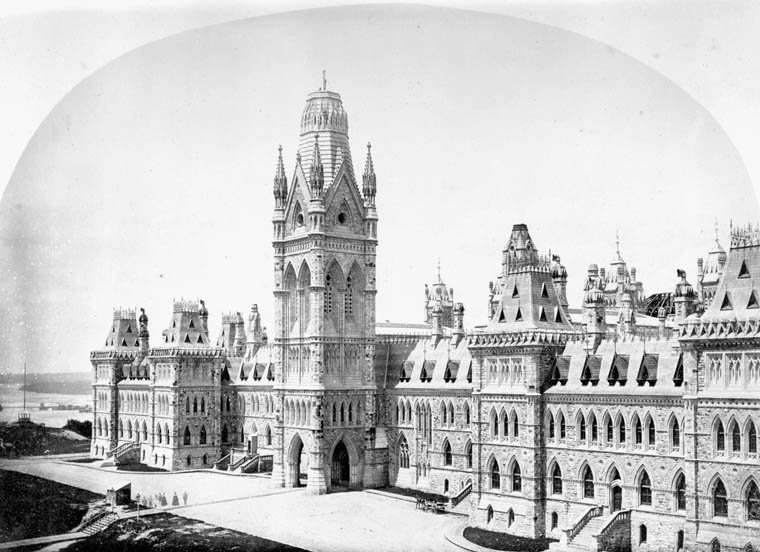

Parliament of Canada
- Long title: An Act for the gradual enfranchisement of Indians, the better management of Indian affairs, and to extend the provisions of the Act 31st Victoria, Chapter 42
- Enacted by: Parliament of Canada
- Assented to: June 22, 1869

The Gradual Enfranchisement Act (French: Acte pourvoyant à l’émancipation graduelle) was an 1869 act of the 1st Canadian Parliament of the Parliament of Canada. The act introduced several policies and regulations for the supervision of Indigenous peoples in Canada, notably the establishment of elected band councils. It updated the 1857 Gradual Civilization Act and was itself superseded in 1876 by the Indian Act.

== Policies introduced by the Act ==
Only those persons designated by the Superintendent-General of Indian Affairs were entitled to land ownership in reserves. To those Indigenous persons who became enfranchised, that is citizens of Canada, they had to adopt English names. Those who were enfranchised became eligible for land grants.

=== Band councils ===
The Act's Section 10 granted the Governor to order that the Chiefs of any "tribe, band or body of Indians shall be elected by the male members of each Indian Settlement of the full age of twenty-one years". There would also be "sub-Chiefs" for every 200 persons within the same group. Section 11 listed that such Chiefs were responsible for the "roads, bridges, ditches and fences within their Reserve to be put and maintained in proper order." If the Superintendent General of Indian Affairs determined that they were not in order, the SG could order works to be done, at the cost to the Reserve, out of their annual allowance or otherwise.

The Act's Section 12 also laid out the duties of such Chiefs/Councils:

- The care of the public health.
- The observance of order and decorum at assemblies of the people in General Council, or on other occasions.
- The repression of intemperance and profligacy.
- The prevention of trespass by cattle.
- The maintenance of roads, bridges, ditches and fences.
- The construction of and maintaining in repair of schoolhouses, council houses and other Indian public buildings.
- The establishment of pounds and the appointment of pound-keepers

The final report of the Royal Commission on Aboriginal Peoples identified the introduction of elected band councils as a key element of the Gradual Enfranchisement Act: "The earlier Gradual Civilization Act had interfered only with tribal land holding patterns. The Gradual Enfranchisement Act, on the other hand, permitted interference with tribal self-government itself."

=== Definition of a status Indian ===
Persons of "less than one-fourth Indian blood" could no longer share in the monies paid to the band or body. This would apply to those born after the passing of the Act.

The Act defined lineage by the men of each band or body, regardless of a band's own kinship rules. If a married Indigenous man became enfranchised, they lost their Indian status, along with his wife and children.

==== Disenfranchisement of Indigenous women who marry outside their First Nation ====
Section 6 introduced the disenfranchisement of Indigenous women. "Provided always that any Indian woman marrying any other than an Indian, shall cease to be an Indian within the meaning of this Act, nor shall the children issue of such marriage be considered as Indians within the meaning of this Act. Additionally, if an Indigenous woman married an Indigenous man of another First Nation, she would cease to be a member of her previous First Nation.

== See also ==
- Gradual Civilization Act
- Detraditionalization
- Detribalization
- Tribal disenrollment
- Indian termination policy
- Cultural assimilation of Native Americans
