= Bagot commission =

19th-century Canadian royal commission

The Bagot commission was a royal commission in the province of Canada convened by Charles Bagot, the province's governor-general. It proposed reforms to predecessor legislation of the Indian Act and to provincial administration of Indigenous affairs. The commission was active from 1842 to 1844.

== Background ==
The Bagot commission was one of numerous Canadian royal commissions regarding Indigenous affairs in the 19th century. There had been six in Upper Canada (modern-day Ontario) and several more in Lower Canada (modern-day Quebec) and the Maritimes. The first such commission was convened in 1827 at the order of F. J. Robinson, 1st Viscount Goderich, and headed by Henry Darling (not to be confused with his son, Charles Henry Darling). That commission delivered its final report on July 24, 1828, and inaugurated the colonial policy of attempting to "civilize" Indigenous peoples. Another commission, conducted by James Buchanan Macaulay; Robert Sympson Jameson; and William Hepburn, registrar of the Court of Chancery, had concluded in 1840, just two years before the Bagot commission began.

Colonial policy toward Indigenous peoples had shifted over the course of the 19th century from an approach emphasizing the "co-existence" of Indigenous peoples and settlers to one that prioritized "christianizing" Indigenous peoples. The first Indian act in Upper Canada had been passed in 1839; the Bagot commission led to further such enactments.

== Commission and recommendations ==
The Bagot commission was convened by Charles Bagot, the governor-general of the province of Canada. Rawson W. Rawson, a civil servant, was its chair. The commission's other two members were John Davidson and William Hepburn, who had been a member of the 1840 Macaulay commission. The Bagot commission was inaugurated on October 10, 1842, and made its report on January 22, 1844. The report was divided into three main parts. The first provided a history of Canadian policy with respect to Indigenous peoples; the second was a statistical survey of Indigenous affairs; and the third described colonial administrative organization. Peter Jones made submissions to the commission during its deliberations.

The commission proposed that the law should recognize individual, as opposed to communal, land title for Indigenous peoples in Canada. It also reaffirmed the government's obligations under the Royal Proclamation of 1763, which stated that Indigenous peoples retained possessory rights to their lands; and proposed that Canadian governance of Indigenous affairs be centralized. A significant recommendation made regarding the apparent "inadequacy" of Indigenous peoples' education was the creation of "Indian boarding schools" for children. This recommendation later developed into the residential school system. In particular, the commission recommended, among other things, that Indian reserves be surveyed; that a licensing regime for forestry on reserve be introduced; that the sale and purchase of land by Indigenous people be legally recognized; and that banks should be created on reserve. The provincial legislature passed two statutes in 1850 and 1851 that enacted some of the commission's proposals.

The commission recommended that the Indian Department of the provincial government be restructured. As a result of this proposal, Samuel Jarvis, erstwhile head of the department, was removed. James Macaulay Higginson replaced him and implemented many of the commission's proposed administrative reforms.

The Bagot commission was followed, in 1856–1858, by the Pennefather commission. The Pennefather commission was mainly concerned with settling issues of ancestry among Indigenous peoples.

== Sources ==
- Alcantara, Christopher (2003). "Individual property rights on Canadian Indian reserves: The historical emergence and jurisprudence of certificates of possession" (PDF). The Canadian Journal of Native Studies. 23 (2): 391–424. ISSN 0715-3244.
- Belshaw, John Douglas (April 13, 2015). "Aboriginal Politics at Mid-Century". Canadian History: Pre-Confederation. BCcampus. ISBN 978-1-7753524-0-2.
- Dickason, Olive Patricia; Calder, Moira Jean (2006). A concise history of Canada's First Nations. Oxford University Press. ISBN 0-19-542415-8. OCLC 62129902.
- Harring, Sidney L. (1998). White man's law : native people in nineteenth-century Canadian jurisprudence. University of Toronto Press. doi:10.3138/9781442683365. ISBN 978-1-4426-8336-5. OCLC 288074761.
- Leslie, John (1982). "The Bagot Commission: Developing a Corporate Memory for the Indian Department". Historical Papers. 17 (1): 31–52. doi:10.7202/030883ar. ISSN 1712-9109.
