= Indian Act =

1876 Canadian act of Parliament

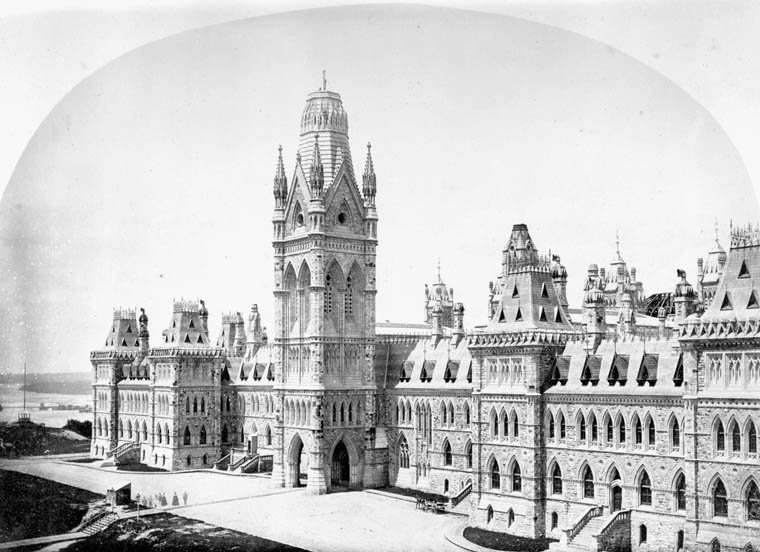

Parliament of Canada
- Long title: An Act respecting Indians
- Citation: RSC 1985, c I-5
- Enacted by: Parliament of Canada
- Assented to: April 12, 1876

Summary
- the Indian Act is the principal vehicle for the exercise of federal jurisdiction over “status Indians,” and governs most aspects of their lives.
- Status: In force

The Indian Act (French: Loi sur les Indiens) is a Canadian Act of Parliament that concerns registered Indians, their bands, and the system of Indian reserves. (Note: Indian has been used in keeping with article name guidelines because of the historical nature of the article and the precision of the name, similar to Canadian Indian residential school system. The use of the name also provides relevant context about the era in which the legislation was established, specifically one in which Indigenous peoples in Canada were homogeneously referred to as Indians rather than by language that distinguishes First Nations, Inuit and Métis peoples. Use of Indian is limited throughout the page to proper nouns and references to government legislation.) First passed in 1876 and still in force with amendments, it is the primary document that defines how the Government of Canada interacts with the 614 First Nation bands in Canada and their members. Throughout its long history, the act has been a subject of controversy and has been interpreted in different ways by both Indigenous Canadians and non-Indigenous Canadians. The legislation has been amended many times, including "over five major changes" made in 2002.

The act is very wide-ranging in scope, covering governance, land use, healthcare, education, and more on Indian reserves. Notably, the original Indian Act defines two elements that affect all Indigenous Canadians:

- It says how reserves and bands can operate. The act sets out rules for governing Indian reserves, defines how bands can be created, and defines the powers of "band councils". Bands do not have to have reserve lands to operate under the act.
- It defines who is, and who is not, recognized as an "Indian"; that is, who has Indian status. The act defines types of Indian persons who are not recognized as "registered" or "status" Indians, who are therefore denied membership in bands.

The act was passed because the Crown relates differently to First Nations (historically called "Indians") than to other ethnic groups because of their previous history on the land. When Canada confederated in 1867, the new state inherited legal responsibilities from the colonial periods under France and Great Britain, most notably the Royal Proclamation of 1763 which made it illegal for British subjects to buy land directly from Indian nations, since only the Crown could add land to the British Empire from other sovereign nations through treaties. This led to early treaties between Britain and nations the British still recognized as sovereign, like the "Peace and Friendship Treaties" with the Mi'kmaq and the Upper Canada treaties. During the negotiations around Canadian Confederation, the framers of Canada's constitution wanted the new federal government to inherit Britain's former role in treaty-making and land acquisition, and specifically assigned responsibility for "Indians and lands reserved for Indians" to the federal government (rather than the provinces), by the terms of Section 91(24) of the Constitution Act, 1867. The Indian Act replaced any laws on the topic passed by a local legislature before a province joined Canadian Confederation, creating a definitive national policy.

== Original rationale and purpose ==
The act was introduced in 1875 by the Liberal government of Alexander Mackenzie as a consolidation of various laws concerning Indigenous peoples enacted by the separate colonies of British North America prior to Confederation, most notably the Gradual Civilization Act passed by the Parliament of the Province of Canada in 1857 and the Gradual Enfranchisement Act of 1869. The act was passed by the Parliament of Canada under the provisions of Section 91(24) of the Constitution Act, 1867, which provides Canada's federal government exclusive authority to govern in relation to "Indians and Lands Reserved for Indians". It was an attempt to codify rights promised to indigenous peoples by King George III in the Royal Proclamation of 1763 while at the same time enforcing Euro-Canadian standards of "civilization". The general goal of the Indian Act in its entirety, was to control virtually every aspect of Indigenous life, from birth to death.

The purpose of the act, as stated by its drafters, was to administer Indian affairs in such a way that Indian people would feel compelled to renounce their Indian status and join Canadian civilization as full members: a process called enfranchisement. Settler colonies, which were later renamed dominions in 1907, were not only partners with the British empire dedicated to creating a presence in the New World, but they also had the power to control Indigenous people within their own territories, as a result of the Indian Act. This effectively prevented Indigenous men and women from self-governance in their own territories, which was crucial to their way of life. In fact, Duncan Campbell Scott, who was an Indian agent in North America during the twentieth century, famously stated, "I want to get rid of the Indian problem (...) Our object is to continue until there is not a single Indian in Canada that has not been absorbed into the body politic and there is no Indian question."

The idea of enfranchisement predated the 1876 version of the act and survived in some form until 1985. From the introduction in 1857 by the Taché-Macdonald administration of the Gradual Civilization Act until 1961, the enfranchisement process was optional for men of age 21 able to read and write English or French.

Reserves, under this legislation, were islands within Canada to which were attached a different set of Indigenous rights. "Enfranchisement" derives from the idea of "franchise", which has gradually been degraded as "vote". Indigenous people with the franchise became official citizens of Canada (or British subjects before 1947), were allowed to vote for representatives, were expected to pay taxes, and lived "off-reserve". By contrast, groups of people who lived on a reserve were subject to a different set of rights and obligations. One needed to descend from an Indian to be allowed to live on a reserve.

The great aim of our legislation has been to do away with the tribal system and assimilate the Indian people in all respects with the other inhabitants of the Dominion as speedily as they are fit to change.

— John A Macdonald, 1887

The tenure of land in a reserve was limited to the collective, or tribe, by virtue of a Crown protectorate. Interactions between enfranchised citizens and Indians were subject to strict controls; for example, the enfranchised were forbidden by the Royal Proclamation of 1763 to traffic in alcohol or land with Indians. The Crown (in this case the Indian Department) hoped, by means of fiduciary duty that it voluntarily took on, to preserve Indian identity. But later the government of the Province of Canada conceived of the compulsory enfranchisement scheme of the Gradual Civilization Act. The 1985 amendment to the Indian Act extinguished the idea of enfranchisement, although by then Status Indians were Canadian citizens by birth.

== Self governance ==
Prior to European settlement in Canada, Indigenous peoples throughout the country had their own unique cultures, languages and systems of law and government, that varied drastically depending on the region and band. These systems and understandings of government were completely independent from dominant perspectives in Europe. Despite this, one commonality between bands across the country, was that most political units were organized by extended families, and these units were often referred to as clans. In addition, political organization within Indigenous communities can be broken down into two major styles. The first system was largely rooted in rank, status and hierarchy, whereas the second was much less structured and followed more of an egalitarian structure. No matter which model of self-governance the community followed, one major theme was the family with regards to institutions of governance. This can be further seen in the fact that most often, leadership selection were often rooted in kinship principles, meaning leaders are often selected through familial descent. Even in egalitarian systems, members of a clan would unanimously select a relative to represent their collective interests in the boarder political landscape.

Furthermore, the most prominent example of Indigenous political organization is the Haudenosaunee (or Iroquois Confederacy) and their longhouse system of government. This unity of bands stretched from Eastern to Western Canada, was created to defend against European contact and settlement, and they shared many principles, including self-governance. In this confederacy, a council of chiefs were appointment by the clan mothers, and these men were responsible for governing and making decisions for the benefit of the entire confederacy. This demonstrates the necessity of men and women in self-governance, with men often taking on roles of leaders, but women being just as critical in the decision making process, and preservation of their culture and principles. This can be further seen in the fact that though clan mothers would appoint men as chiefs, if they proved to be corrupt or refused to listen to the needs of the people, clan mothers had the power to strip any chief of their title. This demonstrates that despite European understanding of Indigenous society and governance, Indigenous peoples across Canada had distinct and unique systems of government and politics, that reflected their beliefs and culture.

== Property rights prior to European settlement ==
Beginning before European settlement, Indigenous peoples always had a deep connection to the land and the properties they lived on. Two of the most crucial food sources for early Indigenous peoples were fish and buffalo, and the capture of these resources relied on property rights and the allocation of land. Indigenous settlements in the Pacific coast relied on the dependability of the salmon run. The reserves and smokehouses crucial to this market were owned by families, and decisions about who owned what land, and any transfer of said land were often made in public at potlatch celebrations. Within this fishing industry, local group leaders were responsible for smaller groups within a clan, who then answered to a larger clan leader, who finally had communications with the tribal leader. Each local leader was responsible for catching, preserving and allocating the fish, and this created a system of hierarchy where all needs of the people were met and understood. Additionally, each family received a portion of the goods in exchange for their labour in the industry, meaning men, women and children all had a crucial role in the operation of the fishing industry on their land.

Similar to the Indigenous peoples of the Pacific coast, settlements in the Great Plains and Prairies relied on the hunting of buffalo, which led to their own understanding of property rights. Because buffalo migrate often, the property rights and division of territories for competing bands in this region were rarely perfect. Instead of patrolling the perimeter of their perceived territories constantly, rival settlements in these areas had strategies that prevented outside competitors from entering their territories, which included raids on neighbouring towns for horses and weaponry, and even the massacre of their opponents if numbers were high enough.

This demonstrates that depending on the territory, Indigenous peoples had specific property rights, especially with regards to their clothing, food and animals, and when possible, their territories as well. Oftentimes, specific property rights were allocated to a family unit, which placed emphasis on the family as a whole (men, women and children), and the goods they received in return were reflective of the labour they had provided to the community at large. Women were often in charge of cultivating fields and crops in inland territories, whereas men were often tasked with the hunting of buffalo and fishing industries. Though food was shared as an act of kindness between members of a community, oftentimes, the food that was yielded by a women in the fields, belonged solely to their family. Though the division of labour with regards to property rights was gendered, every individual member of the community had a role to play in the success and prosperity of the greater settlement.

== Definitions ==
=== "Reserve" ===
Section 18(1) of the Act defines reserves as land "to be held for use and benefit of Indians.

18. (1) Subject to this Act, reserves are held by Her Majesty for the use and benefit of the respective bands for which they were set apart, and subject to this Act and to the terms of any treaty or surrender, the Governor in Council may determine whether any purpose for which lands in a reserve are used or are to be used is for the use and benefit of the band.

— Indian Act, R.S.C., c. I-5, s. 18.

18. (2) The Minister may authorize the use of lands in a reserve for the purpose of Indian schools, the administration of Indian affairs, Indian burial grounds, Indian health projects or, with the consent of the council of the band, for any other purpose for the general welfare of the band, and may take any lands in a reserve required for those purposes, but where an individual Indian, immediately prior to the taking, was entitled to the possession of those lands, compensation for that use shall be paid to the Indian, in such amount as may be agreed between the Indian and the Minister, or, failing agreement, as may be determined in such manner as the Minister may direct.

— Indian Act, R.S.C., c. I-6, s. 18.

=== "Band" ===
The Act defines a "band" as

a body of Indians (a) for whose use and benefit in common, lands, the legal title to which is vested in Her Majesty, have been set apart before, on or after September 4, 1951, (b) for whose use and benefit in common, moneys are held by Her Majesty, or (c) declared by the Governor in Council to be a band for the purposes of this Act.

— Indian Act, R.S.C., c. I-5, s. 2

=== "Indian" ===
Fundamental to Canada's ability to interact with First Nations peoples is the question of defining who they are (e.g. who are the "Indians" of the Indian Act?), and this aspect of the legislation has been an ongoing source of controversy throughout its history. Not all people who self-identify as "Aboriginal" are considered "Indians" under the terms of the act. Only those on the official Indian Register maintained by the federal government (or a local "band list" in some cases) are Status Indians, subject to the full legal benefits and restrictions of the act. Notably this excludes Métis, Inuit, and so-called Non-Status Indians. Various amendments and court decisions have repeatedly altered the rules regarding who is eligible for Indian Status. Many bands now maintain their own band lists.

==== Loss of status prior to 1985 amendments ====
Prior to 1985, Indigenous persons could lose status under the act in a variety of ways, including the following:

- marrying a man who was not a status Indian
- enfranchisement: until 1947, Indigenous persons could not have both Indian status and Canadian citizenship.
- having a father or husband who becomes enfranchised
- having at the age of 21 a mother and paternal grandmother who did not have status before marriage
- being born out of wedlock to a mother with status and a father without.

These provisions interfered with the matrilineal cultures of many First Nations, whereby children were born to the mother's clan and people gained their belonging in the clan from her family. Often property and hereditary leadership passed through the maternal line. In addition, the 1876 Indian Act maintained that Indigenous women with status who married status Indigenous men would, in the event of divorce, be unable to regain their status to the band they were originally registered in. This occurred as a result of the act's enforcement of the patrilineal descent principle required to determine an individual's eligibility for Indian status. As individuals, Indigenous women were not eligible for status or able to transfer status to their children in their own right. Indian status could only be reacquired or transferred legally by proof of an Indigenous father or through marriage to a husband with status.

In Attorney General of Canada v. Lavell (1974), these laws were upheld despite arguments made under the Canadian Bill of Rights. The act was amended in 1985 (Bill C-31) to restore status to people who had lost it in one of these ways, and to their children. Though people accepted into band membership under band rules may not be status Indians, Bill C-31 clarified that various sections of the Indian Act would apply to such members. The sections in question are those relating to community life (e.g., landholdings). Sections relating to Indians (Aboriginal people) as individuals (in this case, wills and taxation of personal property) were not included.

===== Discriminatory definition issues =====
Canadian writer Bonita Lawrence discusses a feminist position on the relationship between federal definition and Indian identity in Canada. Until 1985, subsection 12(1)(b) of the act "discriminated against Indian women by stripping them and their descendants of their Indian status if they married a man without Indian status." Under subsection 12(2) of the act, "'illegitimate' children of status Indian women could also lose status if the alleged father was known not to be a status Indian and if the child's status as an Indian was "protested" by the Indian agent." Further, subparagraph 12(1)(a)(iv), which Lawrence calls the "double mother" clause, "removed status from children when they reached the age of 21 if their mother and paternal grandmother did not have status before marriage." Much of the discrimination stems from the Indian Act amendments and modifications in 1951.

Lawrence discusses the struggles of Jeannette Corbiere Lavell and Yvonne Bédard in the early 1970s, two Indigenous women who had both lost their Indian status for marrying white men. Lavell, whose activism helped create the Ontario Native Women's Association and also held the position of vice president of the Native Women's Association of Canada, and other Indigenous women were key actors in generating public awareness of gender discrimination in Canadian law and paving the way for later amendments to the Indian Act that allowed some women and their children to regain and/or attain status under Bill-C31. Meanwhile, the Supreme Court of Canada ruled that the Indian Act was not discriminatory, as the pair gained the legal rights of white women at the same time they lost the status of Indian women, in a parallel to R. v. Drybones. In 1981, Sandra Lovelace, a Maliseet woman from western New Brunswick, forced the issue by taking her case to the United Nations Human Rights Committee, contending that she should not have to lose her own status by her marriage. The Canadian law was amended in 1985.

== Policies enacted via the act ==
=== Gender discrimination ===
Within Indigenous communities, women held crucial roles as leaders and matriarchs, that was illegitimated because of gender based discrimination found in the Indian Act. Polices and procedures within the act disproportionately impacted women more severely than men, that impacted their economic, social, cultural and psychological standings within their home bands. The Canadian government applied gender bias requirements to the legal status of Aboriginal peoples in Canada. This can first be seen in the Gradual Enfranchisement Act and Indian Act of 1876 and 1951, wherein Indigenous women were denied their status rights, simply for being a woman. Additionally, Gradual Enfranchisement Act, passed legislation that stated a status Indian woman who married a man who was not a status Indian became non-status, and any children of those unions also lost their status Without legal status, Aboriginal women are unable to access treaty benefits, practice inherent rights to live on their reserve, inherit family property or be buried on reserve with ancestors. Restricted from access to their native community, Aboriginal women without legal status were unable to participate in ceremonies and rituals on their traditional land. However, these conditions did not apply to status Indian men who married non-status women; these men were able to keep their status. For women, a marriage with a man who was either outside of their band, non-Indigenous, or a non-status Indigenous man, (such as Metis) were not only at threat of losing their Indigenous identity, but it also threatened the familial and community ties that are so important to Indigenous life. A woman could also lose her status in her own band, or her husbands band, if her husband chose to become disenfranchised, (give up his Indian status, whether voluntarily or through avenues such as attending post-secondary) which again demonstrates the inequality amongst genders present in the Indian Act.

Section 12, paragraph 1(b) of the act worked to disadvantage the position of Aboriginal women and can be considered an attempt to demolish Aboriginal families and alienate Aboriginal women from their land. Inflicting gender discriminatory laws, the Canadian government marginalized and disadvantaged Aboriginal women. Section 12 gained the attention of women's movements contributing to a variety of proposals for reform. Amended in 1985 through Bill C-31, section 12 was removed and status was reinstated to those affected. The 1985 amendments led to the repatriation of status for many Indigenous women and their children but did not guarantee acceptance into an Indian band. A decade later, nearly 100,000 people had their status reinstated while bands gained control of membership responsibilities that were previously administrated by the Department of Indian Affairs. Consequently, the reality of scarce access to essential services and resources amongst Indigenous communities became a primary factor driving the membership process and its outcomes. Despite the fact that amendments were made to the Indian Act, such as the amendment's of 1951 which came as a response to the Universal Declaration of Human Rights, which lifted the ban on religious and cultural ceremonies, and gave women the right to vote in band elections, deep-rooted gender discrimination within the act would continue to impact Indigenous women and their families for generations.

==== An Act to Amend the Indian Act (Bill C-31) ====
As stated in Bill C-31, women who lost their status as a result of marrying a man who was not a status Indian can apply for reinstatement and regain status under subsection 6(1). However, the children of reinstated women are subject to registration under subsection 6(2). Aboriginal people registered under section 6(2) are unable to transmit status to future generations. Thus, by reinstating women under section 6 of the act, the Canadian government failed to completely remove gender discrimination from its legislation, as the children of reinstated women have restrictions on their status, and status Indian men continue to hold a greater quality of status than women. Under Bill C-31, this system became known as the second generation cut-off. Bill C-31 amendments create a new system for classifying status Indians that maintains gender discrimination. Indigenous women's movements expressed that Bill C-31 failed to eliminate all gender discrimination from the Indian Act, and in 2010 the Canadian government introduced Bill C-3 (the Act to Promote Gender Equality in Indian Registration).

Bill C-31 attempts to recognise the United Nations' Human Rights Committee decision in the Sandra Lovelace case and Charter compliance issues. However, under Bill C-31, a woman who regains status falls under 6(1) and her children fall under 6(1) status. However, anybody who loses and regains status not due to marriage falls under 6(2) and cannot gain status [like 6(1)]. This action has ultimately violated the United Nations' International Covenant on Civil and Political Rights through the discriminatory practices of the Indian Act; this law discriminates against Indigenous women and their descendants in their right to express their culture. In addition, this decision was also made based on the 2007 Supreme Court of British Columbia case of Sharon McIvor and her son, Jacob Grisner, that have been waiting over a decade of a verdict of their case. The UNHRC's decision has determined that Bill C-31 has violated Articles 3 and 26 of the International Covenant, in concurrence of Article 27. As well, in Article 2(3)(a) of the decision, the Government of Canada must provide effective remedy.

Under the United Nations' International Covenant on Civil and Political Rights, the Government of Canada is required in 180 days to fulfill these requirements: to ensuring that paragraph 6(1)(a) of the Indian Act is understood in a way that allows registration of those who were not previously registered under the distinction of paragraph 6(1)(a) on the basis of sex and gender, account for the ongoing discrimination of Indigenous peoples in Canada of gender and sex in the Indian Act and to avoid future discrimination similar to this Bill.

==== Gender Equity in Indian Registration Act (Bill C-3) ====
Bill C-3 amendments to the act (Gender Equity in Indian Registration Act—GEIRA) permitted Aboriginal women reinstated under subsection 6(2) to be eligible for 6(1) status. Creating paragraph 6(1)(c.1) registration, reinstated Aboriginal women could only be eligible for registration under 6(1) if they had non-status children. Since it was the children of Aboriginal women who had been affected by restrictions under subsection 6(2) legal registration, only women who had children were eligible to be registered under subsection 6(1) of the act. Continuing to place restrictions on the status of reinstated women, Bill C-3 does not remove all gender bias provisions from the act.

==== An Act to amend the Indian Act (Bill S-3) ====
Bill S-3, An Act to amend the Indian Act in response to the Superior Court of Quebec decision in Descheneaux c. Canada (Procureur général) addresses gender-based inequalities in the Indian Act. Bill S-3 received royal assent in December 2017 and came in to full effect in August 2019. With it, "most of the sex inequalities have been removed from the Indian Act." But "there is still other discrimination in place ... involving enfranchisement and adoption."

=== Residential schools ===
In 1920, amendments to the Indian Act made school attendance in federally run Residential Schools mandatory for Indigenous children between the ages of seven and fifteen. More often than not, Indigenous children were ripped from their homes, parents, and communities in order to attend these schools. The goal of these institutions was essentially to, "'Christianize and civilize' Aboriginal peoples." away from the influence and control that was traditionally executed by parents and elders within the community. Though these schools were federally funded, the day-to-day operations were led by nuns and religious leaders of Christian denominations in Canada. By removing these children from the influence of their families and communities, these religious leaders could strip them of their cultural identity and language, making it easier for them to transition into a Euro-centric society.

Additionally, the expectations of boys and girls within these institutions was incredibly gendered, with daily tasks reflecting what would be seen in a European society. Girls were expected to cook, sew, do laundry and work in the kitchen, whereas boys were taught how to cut wood, run a farm, look after animals and operate as tradesmen. The strict regiment of these institutions stripped children of their self-esteem and independence, and more often than not, by the time they were old enough to leave these schools, they had become so institutionalized that they were not prepared for life outside its walls. These young children were also taught to believe that the communities they had come from, including their parents and elders, who had been responsible for their protection and education up until this point, were dirty and wrong. They were taught that the stories and traditions that had been passed down to them from elders and community leaders, were nothing but make believe, that ought to be replaced with European understandings of creation. As a result, many of the origin stories that Indigenous communities hold dear, were lost, as children were institutionalized to feel ashamed of their culture, even after they left the schools.

For many victims, the Residential School experience has caused intergenerational trauma, which is passed down from parents to younger generations. Because these school's punished students who spoke in their mother tongue, or attempted to participate in celebrations or worship common in their home communities, victims of these schools would go onto raise children that knew very little about their ancestry and Indigenous background. Children were forced into these institutions, and many of them never saw their parents again, celebrated their ancestry, or speak in their native tongue.

=== Bans on religious ceremonies ("Potlatch Law") ===
In 1885, an amendment to the act banned the Potlatch ceremony of the West Coast peoples. The Potlatch ban drove traditional ceremonies underground. A similar amendment in 1895 banned the Sun Dance of the Plains peoples, which was not lifted until 1951. Although lifted in 1951, repression of Indigenous spiritual practices continued in Canadian prisons through to the 1980s, as prison wardens often denied Indigenous peoples access to materials used for prayer.

=== Restriction on access to the courts ===
Starting in the early 1900s, the Nisga'a First Nation started or attempted to start several legal proceedings to take control of their traditional territory. A series of attempts were denied by the B.C. government or not pursued by the Canadian government. A 1927 amendment (Section 141) forbade any First Nation or band from retaining a lawyer for the purpose of making a claim against Canada, and further forbade them from raising money to retain a lawyer, on punishment of imprisonment

=== Tax exemption ===
Section 87 exempts Indians from paying taxes on two types of property: (a) the interest of an Indian or a band in reserve lands or surrendered lands; and (b) the personal property of an Indian or a band situated on a reserve.

== Relation to the constitution ==
The rights exclusive to First Nations in the Indian Act are protected under Section 25 of the Constitution Act, 1982' provides that the Canadian Charter of Rights and Freedoms shall not be interpreted as negating Aboriginal, treaty or other rights of Canada's Aboriginal peoples.

=== Section 88 ===
Section 88 of the act states that provincial laws may affect Aboriginal peoples if they are of "general application", meaning that they affect other people as well as Aboriginals. Hence, provincial laws are incorporated into federal law, since otherwise the provincial laws would be unconstitutional. In Kruger and al. v. The Queen (1978), the Supreme Court found that provincial laws with a more significant impact on Aboriginals than other people can be upheld, as "There are few laws which have a uniform impact."

Constitutional scholar Peter Hogg argues that in Dick v. The Queen (1985), the Supreme Court "changed its mind about the scope of s. 88." Section 88 could now protect provincial laws relating to primary Aboriginal issues and even limiting Aboriginal rights.

== History of proposed and actual changes ==
=== List of precursors and amendments ===
==== Pre-Confederation ====
- 1839: Act for the Protection of the Indians in Upper Canada
- 1850: An Act for the Protection of the Indians in Upper Canada from imposition, and the property occupied or enjoyed by them from trespass and injury (13&14 Vic. c.74)
- 1850: An Act for the Protection of the Indians in Lower Canada from imposition, and the property occupied or enjoyed by them from trespass and injury" (13&14 Vic. c.42)
- 1857: Act to Encourage the Gradual Civilization of Indian Tribes in this Province, and to Amend the Laws Relating to Indians (20 Vic. c.26) through voluntary enfranchisement
- 1859: An Act respecting Civilization and Enfranchisement of certain Indians

==== Post-Confederation ====
- 1868: An Act providing for the organisation of the Department of the Secretary of State of Canada, and for the management of Indian and Ordnance Lands was created.
- 1869: An Act for the gradual enfranchisement of Indians, the better management of Indian affairs, and to extend the provisions of the Act 31st Victoria, Chapter 42 introduced changes to the enfranchisement process.
- 1874: An Act to amend certain Laws respecting Indians, and to extend certain Laws relating to matters connected with Indians to the Provinces of Manitoba and British Columbia extended westward the effect of Canadian legislation regarding Indians.
- 1876: An Act to amend and consolidate the laws respecting Indians (the original Indian Act) was passed.
- 1879: An Act to amend The Indian Act, 1876 amended the act to allow "half-breeds" to withdraw from treaty; to allow punishment for trespassing on reserves; to expand the powers of chief and council to include punishment by fine, penalty or imprisonment; and to prohibit houses of prostitution.
- 1880: An Act to amend and consolidate the laws respecting Indians passed.
- 1881: Amended to make officers of the Indian Department, including Indian Agents, legal justices of the peace, able to enforce regulations. The following year they were granted the same legal power as magistrates. Further amended to prohibit the sale of agricultural produce by Indians in Prairie Provinces without an appropriate permit from an Indian agent.
- 1884: Amended to force attendance of Indian youth in school. Amended to prevent elected band leaders who have been deposed from office from being re-elected.
- 1884: Amended to prohibit the potlatch and Tamanawas dances.
- 1894: Amended to remove band control of non-indigenous living on reserve. This power now rested exclusively in the hands of the Superintendent-General of Indian Affairs.
- 1896: Amended to extend the ban on potlatch and Tamanawas dances to outlaw all dances, ceremonies and festivals that involved the wounding of animals or humans, or the giving away of money or goods.
- 1905: Amended to allow Aboriginal people to be removed from reserves near towns with more than 8,000 residents.
- 1906: Amended to allow 50% of the sale price of reserve lands to be given to band members, following the surrender of that land.
- 1911: Amended to allow municipalities and companies to expropriate portions of reserves, without surrender, for roads, railways, and other public works. Further amended to allow a judge to move an entire reserve away from a municipality if it was deemed "expedient." These amendments were also known as the "Oliver Act".
- 1914: Amended to require western Indians to seek official permission before appearing in "Aboriginal costume" in any "dance, show, exhibition, stampede or pageant."
- 1918: Amended to allow the Superintendent-General to lease out uncultivated reserve lands to non-Aboriginals if the new lease-holder used it for farming or pasture.
- 1920: Amended to make it mandatory for Aboriginal parents to send their children to Indian residential school (Indian Act, 1920 s.10(1)). Also amended to allow the Department of Indian Affairs to ban hereditary rule of bands. Further amended to allow for the involuntary enfranchisement (and loss of treaty rights) of any status Indian considered fit by the Department of Indian Affairs, without the possession of land previously required for those living off reserve. Repealed two years later but reintroduced in a modified form in 1933.
- 1927: Amended to prevent anyone (Indigenous or otherwise) from soliciting funds for Indian legal claims without a special license from the Superintendent-General. This effectively prevented any First Nation from pursuing Aboriginal land claims.
- 1930: Amended to prevent a pool hall owner from allowing entrance to an Indian who "by inordinate frequenting of a pool room either on or off an Indian reserve misspends or wastes his time or means to the detriment of himself, his family or household". The owner could face a fine or a one-month jail term.
- 1936: Amended to allow Indian agents to direct band council meetings, and to cast a deciding vote in the event of a tie.
- 1951: Amended to allow the sale and slaughter of livestock without an Indian Agent permit. Status women are allowed to vote in band elections. Attempts to pursue land claims and the use of religious ceremonies (such as potlatches) are no longer prohibited by law. Further amended for the compulsory enfranchisement of First Nations women who married non-status men (including Métis, Inuit and non-status Indian, as well as non-Aboriginal men), thus causing them to lose their status, and denying Indian status to any children from the marriage.
- 1958: Bill C-24 Métis scrip provision. On June 9, 1958, the Minister of Citizenship and Immigration, Ellen Fairclough, introduced legislation that would keep persons and their descendants that had received "half-breed lands and money scrip" (land-entitlements) from being removed from the Indian Register. Under the previous versions of the Indian Act, persons who had received these land allocations were not entitled to be registered as status Indians. In the Senate of Canada the bill was debated by the newly appointed Senator James Gladstone in his maiden speech on August 12, 1958. Gladstone's speech was the first time the Blackfoot language from the Kainai Nation had been used in parliamentary proceedings. The bill received royal assent on August 13, 1958.
- 1961: Amended to end the compulsory enfranchisement of men or bands.
- 1970: A judgement in R. v. Drybones, [1970] S.C.R. 282, rules section 94(b) inoperable for violating Section 1(b) of the Canadian Bill of Rights.
- 1971: Parliament voted to repeal section 94 in its entirety.
- 1985: Indian Act amended to void the enfranchisement process. Amended to allow status Indian women the right to keep or regain their status even after "marrying out" and to grant status to the children (but not grandchildren) of such a marriage. This amendment was debated in Parliament as Bill C-31. Under this amendment, full status Indians are referred to as 6–1. A child of a marriage between a status (6–1) person and a non-status person qualifies for 6–2 (half) status. If that child grows up and in turn married a non-status person, the child of that union would be non-status. If a 6–2 marries a 6–1 or another 6–2, the children revert to 6–1 status. Blood quantum is disregarded, or rather, replaced with a "two-generation cut-off clause". Under amendments to the Indian Act (Bill C-31), Michel Band members have individual Indian status restored. No provision made in Bill C-31 for the restoration of status under the Band enfranchisement provision that was applied to the Michel Band. According to Thomas King, around half of status Indians are currently marrying non-status people, meaning this legislation accomplishes complete legal assimilation in a matter of a few generations.
- 2002: Amended to allow band members living off reserves to vote in band elections and referendums.
- 2011: Gender Equity in Indian Registration Act (Bill C-3) amended provisions of the Indian Act that the Court of Appeal for British Columbia found to be unconstitutional in the case of McIvor v. Canada. The bringing into force of Bill C-3 on January 31, 2011, ensured that eligible grandchildren of women who lost status as a result of marrying non-status men became entitled to registration (Indian status). As a result of this legislation approximately 45,000 persons became newly entitled to registration.
- 2012: Jobs and Growth Act (Bill C-45).
- 2013: 200,000 Métis and 400,000 non-status Indians are included in the federal responsibility for Indians after a 13-year legal dispute.
- 2016: Changes to the Jobs and Growth Act (Bill C-45).
- 2017: Gender-based inequalities addressed (Bill S-3).

=== Attempts to repeal or replace ===
Numerous failed attempts have been made by Canadian parliamentarians to repeal or replace the Indian Act without success. Those changes that have been made have been piecemeal reforms, rather than sweeping revisions.

==== Failed major changes ====
- The Statement of the Government of Canada on Indian policy or "the White Paper" (1969) would have abolished reserves and all other markers of "special status" and assimilated Indians fully into Canada. Failed due to First Nations' opposition (e.g. "the Red Paper") and withdrawn in 1971.
- The Manitoba Framework Agreement – a 1994 agreement between the Assembly of Manitoba Chiefs and the Minister of Indian Affairs, it created a regional pilot project to dismantle the Department of Indian Affairs' regional structure in Manitoba. It was deemed unsuccessful and discontinued in 2004.
- The Indian Act Optional Modification Act (Bill C-79) – introduced in 1996, it would have devolved certain powers to bands, but was opposed by most bands as being too limited and not respecting the principle of Aboriginal self-government as endorsed by the Royal Commission on Aboriginal Peoples. It died in parliament at the start of the 1997 election.
- The First Nations Governance Act (Bill C-7) – introduced in 2002, it would have allowed bands to amend their own leadership selection processes and devolved some other powers. It was opposed by most bands and died in Parliament in 2003.
- Senate Proposals (several) – the most recent is An Act for the Recognition of Self-Governing First Nations (Bill S-216) initiated by Senator Gerry St. Germain in May 2006 which would have allowed bands to write their own constitutions, subject to vetting by the Auditor General. Died in Parliament in September 2007.

==== Opt-outs ====
Since the 1990s, several pieces of legislation have been passed allowing individual bands to opt out of a particular section of the Indian Act if an agreement is signed between the band and the government putting alternative measures in place. These are called "Sectoral Legislative Arrangements". The band remains subject to the act except for the section in question.

- First Nations Land Management Act (FNLMA)—enacted in 1999, it allowed opt-outs of 34 land-related sections of the Indian Act and allows bands to create their own codes on land use and environmental stewardship. Fourteen bands originally signed on, by 2013 there were over 30 bands involved. Repealed and replaced by the Framework Agreement on First Nation Land Management Act.
- First Nations Fiscal Management Act (FNFMA)—enacted in 2005, allows bands to issue their own bonds.
- First Nations Oil and Gas and Moneys Management Act (FNOGMMA)—enacted in 2005, allows bands to opt to take over the management of funds held in trust for them by the Crown, or to assume management of oil and gas resources on their reserves.
- First Nations Commercial and Industrial Development Act (FNCIDA)—enacted in 2006, has allows a band to request the federal government to create regulations for a particular industry on reserve that mirror those of the surrounding province. Amended in 2010 by the First Nations Certainty of Land Title Act (FNCLTA) which creates a registry similar to a provincial land titles registry for on-reserve real estate.
- Framework Agreement on First Nation Land Management Act (FAFNLMA) — enacted in 2022, it replaced the FNLMA in order to reduce the barriers for First Nations taking land management powers on reserves.

== Case law ==
The 1895 amendment of the Indian Act (Section 114) criminalized many Aboriginal ceremonies, which resulted in the arrest and conviction of numerous Aboriginal people for practising their basic traditions. These arrests were based on Aboriginal participation in festivals, dances and ceremonies that involved the wounding of animals or humans, or the giving away of money or goods. The Dakota people (Sioux) who settled in Oak River, Manitoba, in 1875 were known to conduct "give-away dances", also known as the "grass dance". The dance ceremony involved the giving away and exchange of blankets and horses; thus it breached Section 114 of the Indian Act. As a result, Wanduta, an elder of the Dakota community, was sentenced to four months of hard labour and imprisonment on January 26, 1903.

According to Canadian historian Constance Backhouse, the Aboriginal "give-away dances" were ceremonies more commonly known as potlatches that connected entire communities politically, economically and socially. These dances affirmed kinship ties, provided elders with opportunities to pass on insight, legends and history to the next generation, and were a core part of Aboriginal resistance to assimilation. It is estimated that between 1900 and 1904, 50 Aboriginal people were arrested and 20 were convicted for their involvement in such dances. The Indian Act was amended in 1951 to allow religious ceremonies, including the "give-away dance".

In R. v. Jim (1915), the British Columbia Supreme Court found that Aboriginal hunting on Indian reserves should be considered under federal jurisdiction under both the constitution and the Indian Act. The case involved whether Aboriginals were subject to provincial game laws when hunting on Indian reserves.

The act was at the centre of the 1969 Supreme Court case R. v. Drybones, regarding the conflict of a clause forbidding Indians to be drunk off the reserve with the Bill of Rights. The case is remembered for having been one of the few in which the Bill of Rights prevailed in application to Indian rights.

In Corbiere v. Canada (1999), voting rights on reserves were extended under Section Fifteen of the Canadian Charter of Rights and Freedoms.

In Canada (Canadian Human Rights Commission) v. Canada (Attorney General) (2018), the majority found that the Canadian Human Rights Tribunal's determination that the Indian Act did not violate the Canadian Human Rights Act was reasonable due to judicial deference.

== See also ==
- Aboriginal Protection Act 1869 and Half-Caste Act (Australia)
- Canadian Aboriginal law
- Aboriginal land title in Canada
- Indian Health Transfer Policy (Canada)
- Indigenous land claims in Canada
- Indigenous specific land claims in Canada
- Numbered Treaties
- Status of First Nations treaties in British Columbia
- The Canadian Crown and Aboriginal peoples
- The Potlatch Ban
- Treaty of Niagara
