= R v Drybones =

- Supreme Court of Canada

Hearing: October 28, 1968 Judgment: November 20, 1969
- Full case name: Her Majesty The Queen v Joseph Drybones
- Citations: [1970] S.C.R. 282, 1969 CanLII 1 (S.C.C.)
- Prior history: affirming (1967), 61 W.W.R. 370, [1968] 2 C.C.C. 69, 64 D.L.R. (2d) 260 (N.W.T.C.A.); affirming (1967) 60 W.W.R. 321 (N.W.T.Co. Ct.)
- Ruling: The appeal should be dismissed.

Holding
- Section 94(b) of the Indian Act, which makes it a criminal offence for the respondent to do something which his fellow Canadians are free to do without having committed any offence or being made subject to any penalty purely on account of race, is in violation of the respondent's right to equality before the law, protected in Section 1(b) of the Canadian Bill of Rights. Furthermore, an infringing statutory provision that cannot be sensibly construed so as not to infringe the rights enshrined in the Canadian Bill of Rights is inoperative, unless Parliament makes an express declaration that the statutory provision will operate notwithstanding the Canadian Bill of Rights. Therefore, Section 94(b) of the Indian Act is inoperative.

Court membership
- Chief Justice: John Robert Cartwright; Puisne Justices: Gérald Fauteux, Douglas Abbott, Ronald Martland, Wilfred Judson, Roland Ritchie, Emmett Hall, Wishart Spence, Louis-Philippe Pigeon

Reasons given
- Majority: Ritchie J., joined by Fauteux, Martland, Judson, Spence JJ.
- Concurrence: Hall J., joined by None
- Dissent: Cartwright C.J., joined by None
- Dissent: Pigeon J., joined by None
- Dissent: Abbott J., joined by None

Laws applied
- Canadian Bill of Rights, 1960 (Can), c. 44, ss. 1(b), 2; Indian Act, R.S.C. 1952, c. 149, s. 94(b).

R v Drybones, [1970] S.C.R. 282, is a landmark 6-3 Supreme Court of Canada decision holding that the Canadian Bill of Rights "empowered the courts to strike down federal legislation which offended its dictates." Accordingly, the Supreme Court of Canada held that section 94(b) of the Indian Act (which prohibited "Indians" from being intoxicated off of a reserve) is inoperative because it violates section 1(b) of the Canadian Bill of Rights.

Prior to this decision there had been much debate on the application of the Bill of Rights to an infringing statute. One perspective saw the Bill of Rights as an interpretive aid. The other perspective saw it as statute that constrained the supremacy of Parliament, rendering irreconcilable federal enactments of no force or effect. After this case, the overriding power that the Court held flows from the Canadian Bill of Rights was never used, and has since never been reconsidered by the Supreme Court of Canada.

Although the judgement only rendered section 94b inoperable, as a consequence of the case, Parliament voted to repeal section 94 in its entirety in 1971.

== Section 94 ==
Indian Act

94. An Indian who

1. has intoxicants in his possession,
2. is intoxicated, or
3. makes or manufactures intoxicants off a reserve, is guilty of an offence and is liable on summary conviction to a fine of not less than ten dollars and not more than fifty dollars or to imprisonment for a term not exceeding three months or to both fine and imprisonment.

— source

== Background ==
On April 8, 1967, shortly after 11:00pm, Joseph Drybones was discovered intoxicated on the floor of the lobby of the Old Stope Hotel in Yellowknife. On April 10, 1967, Drybones, representing himself without counsel, pleaded guilty to being an Indian who was intoxicated off a reserve, in contravention of section 94(b) of the Indian Act. Drybones was convicted of this offence by Justice of the Peace Thompson and was sentenced to pay a fine of $10 or three days imprisonment. On April 27, 1967, Drybones gave notice that he was appealing the conviction.

In a motion before the Territorial Court of the Northwest Territories, counsel for Drybones argued that since their client did not understand English, he did not understand the nature of the proceedings, rendering his guilty plea invalid and subject to withdrawal. The motion was granted and the guilty plea was revoked by Drybones, the Court ordering a trial de novo.

In the trial de novo, the crown called six witnesses, including the Royal Canadian Mounted Police (RCMP) Constables and the wife of the hotel manager who had found Drybones. The crown also produced Joe Sangris as one of their witnesses, a former chief and leader of the Indian village at Yellowknife for 16 years. Sangris testified that he had known Drybones from his birth, as well as his wife and his father, towards the Crown's attempt to formally prove that Drybones was legally considered an Indian. Sangris also testified that Drybones received treaty money once a year. A similar crown witness was David George Greyeyes, once the regional director of Indian affairs. Greyeyes was the officer charged with the maintenance of Indian records, contractual obligations and the execution of federal treaties involving Indians. Greyeyes produced official records of Drybones, married to Madeline Crapeau with no children. Both Greyeyes and Sangris also testified that there were no Indian reserves in the Northwest Territories.

Counsel for Drybones argued that the Crown failed to prove that Drybones was an Indian within the meaning of Section 2(g) of the Indian Act, which requires that an officially-designated Indian be a member of an Indian band; therefore, Drybones could not be convicted under sections 94(b) of the Indian Act. It was also argued that since there are no reserves in the Northwest Territories, Section 94(b) of the Indian Act is inapplicable to such cases in the Northwest Territories.

However, most crucially in terms of the potential precedent it would set, counsel for Drybones contended that if all the elements of a crime had been committed, the combined effect of sections 94(b) and 96 of the Indian Act violated Section 1(b) of the Canadian Bill of Rights because the legal sanction is more severe and more intrusive on account of race, than the equivalent sections of the Liquor Ordinance that apply to non-Indians. That distinction, counsel argued, is discrimination on account of race and colour, in contravention of the appellant's equality before the law under Section 1(b) of the Canadian Bill of Rights and, therefore, Drybones should be acquitted and the offending law disabled.

== Judgment of the Northwest Territories Territorial Court ==
On June 5, 1967, the Northwest Territories Territorial Court allowed the appeal and acquitted Drybones.

Writing for the court, Justice Morrow concluded that on April 8, 1967, Drybones was indeed an Indian within the meaning of the Indian Act, and that he was intoxicated off a reserve in contravention of section 94(b) of the Indian Act. However, Morrow held that Section 94(b) of the Indian Act is negated because it impermissibly violates section 1(b) of the Canadian Bill of Rights.

While mindful of R v Gonzales (in which the British Columbia Court of Appeal found section 94 consistent with the Canadian Bill of Rights), Morrow asserted that it must be distinguished in light of Robertson and Rosetanni v. R..

In Robertson, Morrow noted that a majority of the Supreme Court emphasized that the appropriate test to determine a violation of the provisions of the Canadian Bill of Rights should turn on the effect of the impugned legislation and not necessarily its intended purpose. Applying the test stipulated by Robertson, Morrow found section 94 of the Indian Act discriminatory. If the impugned provisions of the Indian Act are enforced, the Bill of Rights could not be, as Morrow noted that Indians would have to be treated differently from white Canadians, other immigrant groups and even other groups of aborigines such as the Inuit.

As a remedy, Morrow, citing Chief Justice Cartwright's dissent in Gonzales, decided that since only section 94(b) of the Indian Act is discriminatory, only section 94(b) is therefore inoperative. Morrow stated that the remaining statute is "not discriminatory but merely providing for such things as protection of property and other rights."

== Judgment of the Northwest Territories Court of Appeal ==
On August 25, 1967, the Court of Appeal for the Northwest Territories dismissed the Crown's application for leave to appeal, affirming Drybones's acquittal.

Writing for a unanimous court, Justice Johnson noted that the entire essence of the Crown's application hinged on the authority of the Gonzales decision of the British Columbia Court of Appeal. The Gonzales decision, however, Johnson argues, can no longer be seen as tenable. Johnson contended that Gonzales unduly restricts the interpretation of 'equality before the law' in the Canadian Bill of Rights to a form of "equality before the courts" that would permit discriminatory laws. "If this paragraph," Johnson wrote, "means no more than this, it would hardly have seemed necessary to include it for this right has always been jealously guarded by the courts."

In addition to making the right to 'equality before the law' merely a vain provision, Johnson argued that the interpretation endorsed by Gonzales would also permit Parliament to discriminate on account of race without an express declaration that the impugned provision is to operate notwithstanding the Bill of Rights. Johnson held that discriminatory legislation requires an express declaration by Section 2 of the Bill of Rights to remain operative. Otherwise, if the Canadian Bill of Rights allows segregation on account of race that was recently struck down by the U.S. Supreme Court, the Bill of Rights would become irrelevant Johnson argued, falling "far short of the high purpose expressed both in the Act and its preamble."

Johnson acknowledged that discrimination is not totally prohibited by the Bill of Rights. However, the Bill of Rights does prohibit all discrimination "by reason of race, national origin, colour, religion or sex" as it stipulates. Johnson also dismissed the Crown's arguments based on the purpose of the Indian Act, stressing the importance of the effect of the impugned provision in the analysis and citing, as authority, Robertston and Rosetanni v. Her Majesty The Queen.

Johnson noted that Indians are indeed subject to more severe punishment and a broader prohibition under the Indian Act. As such, he held that the lower court was right to hold the impugned section discriminatory and hence inoperative under the Canadian Bill of Rights.

== Judgment of the Supreme Court of Canada ==
On November 20, 1969, in a 6-3 vote the Supreme Court of Canada dismissed the crown's appeal and upheld Drybones's acquittal.

=== Concurring opinion ===
Justice Hall wrote a concurring opinion, registering his agreement with Justice Ritchie's reasons. Hall further argues that the concept articulated by Justice Tysoe in R. v. Gonzales is merely the equivalent of the separate but equal doctrine established in Plessy v. Ferguson. This doctrine, Hall notes, has been rejected by the United States Supreme Court in Brown v. Board of Education.

Similarly, Hall argues that the Canadian Bill of Rights can only be fulfilled if it has the effect repudiating "discrimination in every law of Canada by reason of race, national origin, colour, religion or sex in respect of the human rights and fundamental freedoms set out in s. 1 in whatever way that discrimination may manifest itself not only as between Indian and Indian but as between all Canadians whether Indian or non-Indian."

=== Dissenting opinions ===
Chief Justice Cartwright and Justices Pigeon and Abbott dissented.

==== Cartwright ====
Chief Justice Cartwright, writing for himself in his dissenting opinion, asserted that there is simply no doubt that Drybones is guilty of contravening Section 94(b), which is "expressed in plain and unequivocal words" Its meaning, he argues, cannot be altered "by the application of any rule of construction to give it a meaning other than that an Indian who is intoxicated off a reserve is guilty of an offence." The Supreme Court of Canada, Cartwright writes, is therefore faced with the unprecedented dilemma of whether to give full effect to the Indian Act or to declare that it "is pro tanto repealed by the Bill [of Rights]."

Cartwright approached this question assuming that the Bill of Rights is indeed infringed by Section 94(b) of the Indian Act. He moreover noted that in Robertson he considered this question himself in his dissent, concluding that the Canadian Bill of Rights shall triumph over any inconsistency even to the point of rendering offensive legislation inoperative. Cartwright remarked that he is now persuaded otherwise.

The question this Court considered can only be answered by determining "whether or not it is the intention of Parliament to confer the power and impose the responsibility upon the courts of declaring inoperative any provision in a Statute of Canada" if a statute cannot be construed and applied to be consistent with the Bill of Rights. If that is the intention of Parliament, Cartwright argues that Parliament would have added an express provision to s. 2 of the Bill of Rights making that unequivocal, like ". . . and if any law of Canada cannot be so construed and applied it shall be regarded as inoperative or pro tanto repealed." Instead, Cartwright argued that the opposite is true: Section 2 of the Canadian Bill of Rights "directs the courts to apply such a law not to refuse to apply it." Therefore, Cartwright wrote that he would dispose of the appeal in the same manner as Justice Pigeon.

==== Abbott ====
Justice Abbott, writing for himself in his dissent, registers his agreement with the reasons of Cartwright, Pigeon and Justice Davey in the British Columbia Court of Appeal's decision in R. v. Gonzales.

Abbott argued that while Parliament may certainly allow the courts to "engage in judicial legislation," such a mandate would "necessarily [imply] a wide delegation of the legislative authority of Parliament to the courts" and "require the plainest of words." Abbott wrote that he is not persuaded that the Canadian Bill of Rights provides anything more than "a canon or rule of interpretation" for legislation. In other words, Parliament has not clearly authorized the Courts to declare legislation inoperative. Abbott wrote that he would therefore dispose of the appeal as provided by Pigeon.

==== Pigeon ====
Justice Pigeon, in his dissent, scoffed at the notion that the respondent's right to 'equality before the law' is violated in this case. He stressed that Parliament's enshrined rights and freedoms in the Bill of Rights that "have existed and shall continue to exist," citing the language used in Section 1. This statement, Pigeon argued, must be seen as a precise qualification of the otherwise ambiguous rights and freedoms enumerated in Section 1 of the Bill of Rights.

In other words, the right to 'equality before the law', enshrined in section 1(b) of the Bill of Rights, must be construed in light of Parliament's power to treat Indians differently. Pigeon observed that Section 91(24) of the British North America Act expressly provides exclusive legislative authority to the federal parliament over "Indians and Lands reserved for the Indians", allowing Parliament discretion "to make legislation applicable only to Indians as such and therefore not applicable to Canadian citizens generally." The conclusion, Pigeon argued, must be that the right to "equality before the law" cannot contain a legal right that had, in fact, been "restricted by any number of statutory and other provisions."

Pigeon also derided as implausible the notion that any legislative provision treating Indians differently is invalid. If this perspective is true, Pigeon remarked, it would fundamentally alter the status of Indians and make the use of Parliament's exclusive legislative authority over Indians always subject to the requirement of expressly declaring "that the law shall operate notwithstanding the Canadian Bill of Rights". It is unlikely, Pigeon wrote, that Parliament intended such a vast effect without more explicit language.

Moreover, the language that is used, Pigeon argued, would seem to indicate that the Bill of Rights merely enacts a rule of construction. As such, Pigeon asserted, the Bill of Rights does not allow the courts not to decline to apply the law.

Pigeon acknowledged that it is unusual to qualify "the operation of a rule of construction." However, he argued that it is merely a reiteration of an already well-established common law principle, since a rule of construction can never have an "effect against the clearly expressed will of Parliament in whatever form it is put." As a matter of fact, Pigeon contended that this qualification in section 2 of the Bill of Rights actually affirms that s. 1 "means what it says and recognizes and declares existing rights and freedoms only." In other words, existing legislation, which embodies and delimits the content of the rights and freedoms enumerated in the Canadian Bill of Rights, cannot be held inoperative by virtue of the Bill of Rights. If the reverse were true, Pigeon wrote, section 2 of the Bill of Rights would be in conflict with its purpose to recognize and declare only the rights that have existed and that shall continue to exist. Moreover, Pigeon argued that the contrasting point of view would violate the well-settled common law presumption against implicit departure from the existing law.

Pigeon asserted that the inferior courts have betrayed this "fundamental principle," which is that it is the duty of the courts "to apply the law as written and they are in no case authorized to fail to give effect to the clearly expressed will of Parliament."

If Parliament's intention was to expand and create new rights, Pigeon reasoned that Parliament would have used "clear language expressing that intention." However, Pigeon contended what is found instead is "an apparent desire to adhere to the traditional principle [of recognizing and declaring only existing rights] and to avoid the uncertainties inherent in broadly worded enactments by tying the broad words to the large body of existing law . . ."

Pigeon maintained that Parliament simply demonstrated no intention of creating a quasi-constitutional statute with teeth, writing:

On the whole, I cannot find in the Canadian Bill of Rights anything clearly showing that Parliament intended to establish concerning human rights and fundamental freedoms some overriding general principles to be enforced by the courts against the clearly expressed will of Parliament in statutes existing at the time. In my opinion, Parliament did nothing more than instruct the courts to construe and apply those laws in accordance with the principles enunciated in the Bill on the basis that the recognized rights and freedoms did exist, not that they were to be brought into existence by the courts.

With respect to the disposition, Pigeon wrote that he would allow the appeal and reverse the judgment of the inferior courts and affirm Drybones' conviction and sentence. He also added that he agreed with the reasoning of Cartwright.

== See also ==
- The Canadian Crown and First Nations, Inuit and Métis
- Canadian Aboriginal case law
- Numbered Treaties
- Indian Act
- Section Thirty-five of the Constitution Act, 1982
- Indian Health Transfer Policy (Canada)
