= Canadian Bill of Rights =

Federal civil rights statute in Canada

Parliament of Canada
- Long title: An Act for the Recognition and Protection of Human Rights and Fundamental Freedoms
- Citation: S.C. 1960, c. 44
- Enacted by: Parliament of Canada
- Assented to: 10 August 1960
- Status: Amended

The Canadian Bill of Rights (French: Déclaration canadienne des droits) is a federal statute and bill of rights enacted by the Parliament of Canada on August 10, 1960. It provides Canadians with certain rights in Canadian federal law in relation to other federal statutes. It was the earliest expression of human rights law at the federal level in Canada, though an implied Bill of Rights had already been recognized in the Canadian common law.

The Canadian Bill of Rights remains in force but is widely acknowledged to be limited in its effectiveness because it is a federal statute only, and so not directly applicable to provincial laws. These legal and constitutional limitations were a significant reason that the Canadian Charter of Rights and Freedoms was entrenched as an unambiguously constitutional-level bill of rights for all Canadians, governing the application of both federal and provincial law in Canada, with the patriation of the Constitution of Canada in 1982. Since patriation, the statute's usefulness in federal law in Canada is mostly limited to issues pertaining to the "enjoyment of property," as set forth in its section 1(a)—a slightly-broader right than is recognized in section seven of the Canadian Charter of Rights and Freedoms.

== Background ==
=== Saskatchewan's Bill of Rights ===
In 1947, Saskatchewan enacted a bill of rights which covered fundamental freedoms and equality rights. It was influenced by proposals for a federal bill of rights made by John Diefenbaker, then an opposition member in the House of Commons from Prince Albert, Saskatchewan. In turn, the Saskatchewan Bill of Rights is considered to have had a formative influence on Prime Minister Diefenbaker, who thirteen years later in 1960, successfully introduced the Canadian Bill of Rights.

=== United Nations ===
In 1948, the General Assembly of the United Nations adopted a Universal Declaration of Human Rights. Civil rights activists in Canada had for some time been advocating for the elimination of discrimination based on sex, ethnicity, race and religion from Canadian laws; the new declaration led to an increasing call for protection of human rights in Canada.

=== John Diefenbaker and a National Bill of Rights ===
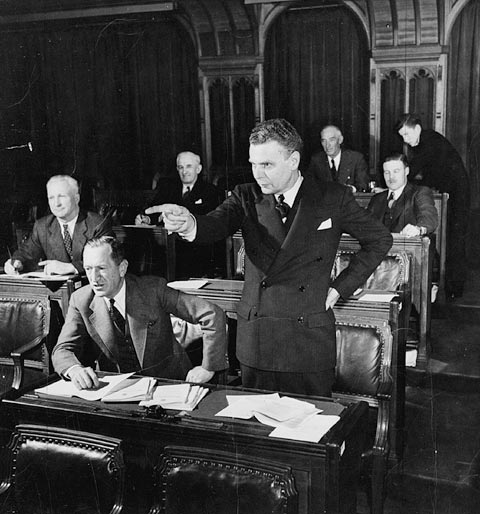
John G. Diefenbaker, M.P., speaking in the House of Commons, Ottawa, Ontario

In 1936, four years before being elected to Parliament, John Diefenbaker began drafting his bill of rights. As a young boy, he saw injustice first-hand in the form of discrimination against French-Canadians, natives, Métis and European immigrants.

On March 16, 1950, a decade before the Canadian Bill of Rights became law, Diefenbaker, then a Saskatchewan MP, told a public forum why such a law was needed. Individuals' freedoms of religion, press, speech and association are threatened by the state, he said. A bill of rights was needed to take a "forthright stand against discrimination based on colour, creed or racial origin".

Diefenbaker advocated for the adoption of a bill of rights during the federal election campaign of 1957. In 1960, as Prime Minister, Diefenbaker introduced the Canadian Bill of Rights, which was enacted by Parliament.

== Features ==
The Canadian Bill of Rights protects numerous rights, most of which were later included in the Charter. Examples include:

- Freedom of speech in Canada and freedom of religion in Canada (now in Section 2 of the Charter)
- Equality rights (more complete rights are contained in Section 15 of the Charter)
- The right to life, liberty and security of the person, and, in another section, rights to fundamental justice (the Charter combines those rights in Section 7)
- The right to the enjoyment of property, which is not enshrined in the Charter
- The right to counsel (now in Section 10 of the Charter).

Section 2 of the Bill of Rights reads as follows:

2. Every law of Canada shall, unless it is expressly declared by an Act of the Parliament of Canada that it shall operate notwithstanding the Canadian Bill of Rights, be so construed and applied as not to abrogate, abridge or infringe or to authorize the abrogation, abridgement or infringement of any of the rights or freedoms herein recognized and declared, and in particular, no law of Canada shall be construed or applied so as to:

(a) authorize or effect the arbitrary detention, imprisonment or exile of any person;
(b) impose or authorize the imposition of cruel and unusual treatment or punishment;
(c) deprive a person who has been arrested or detained

(i) of the right to be informed promptly of the reason for his arrest or detention,
(ii) of the right to retain and instruct counsel without delay, or
(iii) of the remedy by way of habeas corpus for the determination of the validity of his detention and for his release if the detention is not lawful;

(d) authorize a court, tribunal, commission, board or other authority to compel a person to give evidence if he is denied counsel, protection against self-crimination or other constitutional safeguards;
(e) deprive a person of the right to a fair hearing in accordance with the principles of fundamental justice for the determination of his rights and obligations;
(f) deprive a person charged with a criminal offence of the right to be presumed innocent until proved guilty according to law in a fair and public hearing by an independent and impartial tribunal, or of the right to reasonable bail without just cause; or
(g) deprive a person of the right to the assistance of an interpreter in any proceedings in which he is involved or in which he is a party or a witness, before a court, commission, board or other tribunals, if he does not understand or speak the language in which such proceedings are conducted.

The notwithstanding wording of section 2 is a precursor to the notwithstanding clause of the Charter.

While the Bill of Rights is considered only quasi-constitutional because it was enacted as an ordinary Act of the Parliament of Canada, it contains the following provision:

3. (1) Subject to subsection (2), the Minister of Justice shall, in accordance with such regulations as may be prescribed by the Governor in Council, examine every regulation transmitted to the Clerk of the Privy Council for registration pursuant to the Statutory Instruments Act and every Bill introduced in or presented to the House of Commons by a Minister of the Crown, in order to ascertain whether any of the provisions thereof are inconsistent with the purposes and provisions of this Part and he shall report any such inconsistency to the House of Commons at the first convenient opportunity.

(2) A regulation need not be examined in accordance with subsection (1) if prior to being made it was examined as a proposed regulation in accordance with section 3 of the Statutory Instruments Act to ensure that it was not inconsistent with the purposes and provisions of this Part.

== Criticism and support ==
Criticism of the Bill of Rights has mostly centred on its limited effect. The ineffectiveness of the Bill of Rights in achieving its stated aim was the main reason that, two decades later, it was thought necessary to adopt a constitutionally entrenched charter.

The Bill of Rights was (and is) limited in several ways.

First, it does not explicitly amend any conflicting statutes, either to remove conflicts or to insert explicit allowances for the statutes to operate notwithstanding the Bill of Rights. When called upon to apply conflicting laws, the courts typically sought to interpret a later statute as creating a minimal disturbance of earlier law. In practice, that meant that the courts relied on Parliament to repeal or amend any laws contrary to the Bill of Rights. Disappointments for those who wanted courts to enforce rights vigorously included Bliss v Canada (AG) and Canada (AG) v Lavell. A notable exception was R v Drybones.

Second, since the Bill of Rights was not a constitutional amendment, there was some debate as to whether it was binding on future parliaments.

Third, because it is an ordinary statute, the authority of the Bill of Rights is limited to matters set out in Section 91 of the Constitution Act, 1867, as being under the legislative authority of the Parliament of Canada.

However, the 1960 Act enumerates some rights (such as property rights and specific legal rights) not protected under the Canadian Charter of Rights and Freedoms. For that and other reasons, the 1960 Act is occasionally referenced in court decisions today.

== See also ==
- Canadian Human Rights Act of 1977
- Canadian values
- Constitution of Canada
- Canadian Charter of Rights and Freedoms
- Veterans' Bill of Rights
- New Zealand Bill of Rights Act
- Saskatchewan Bill of Rights
