= Cleaning =

Activity that removes dirt and other particles from people, animals and objects

Cleaning Methods

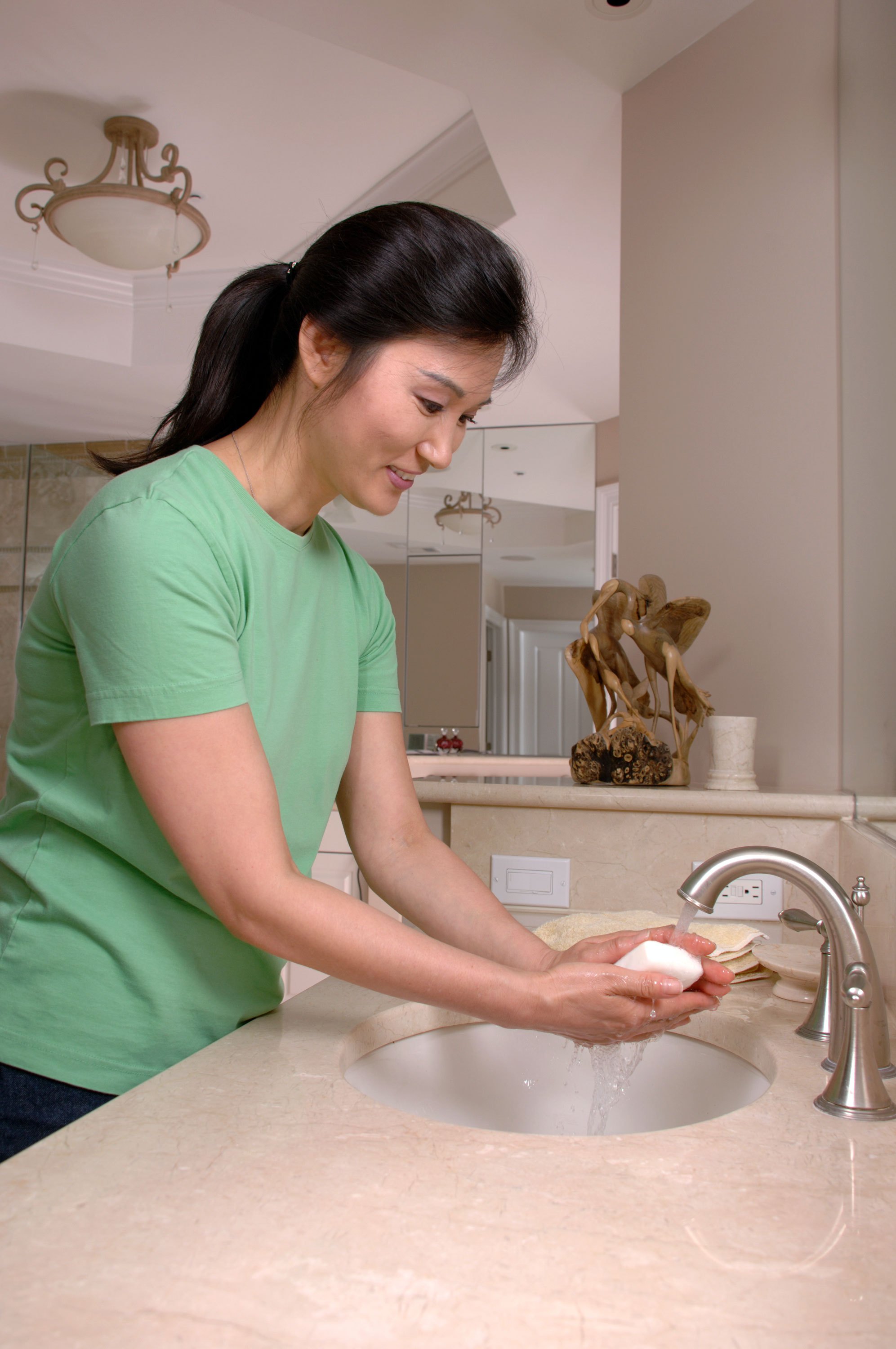
Hand washing (part of hygiene)

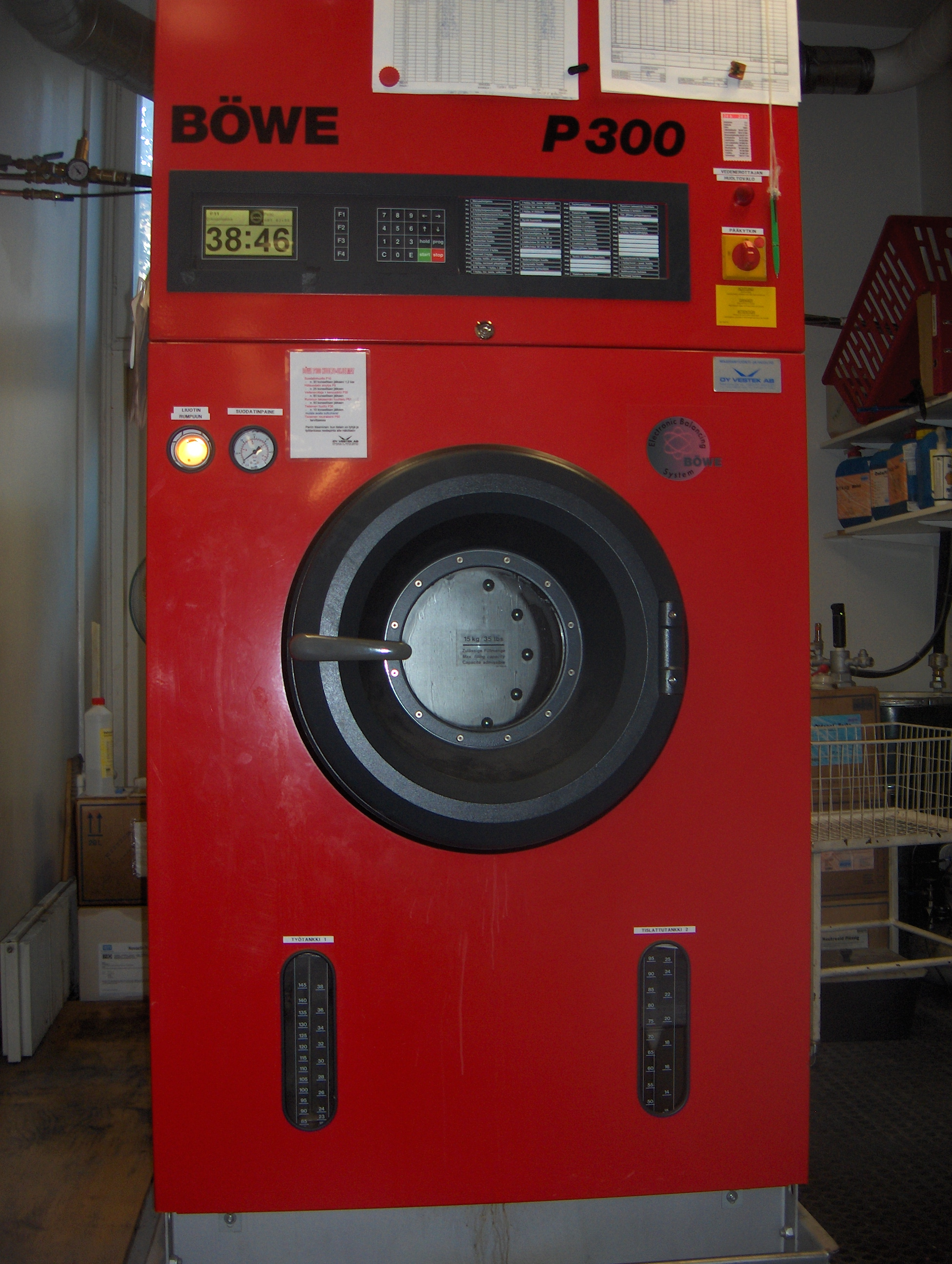
A dry cleaning machine

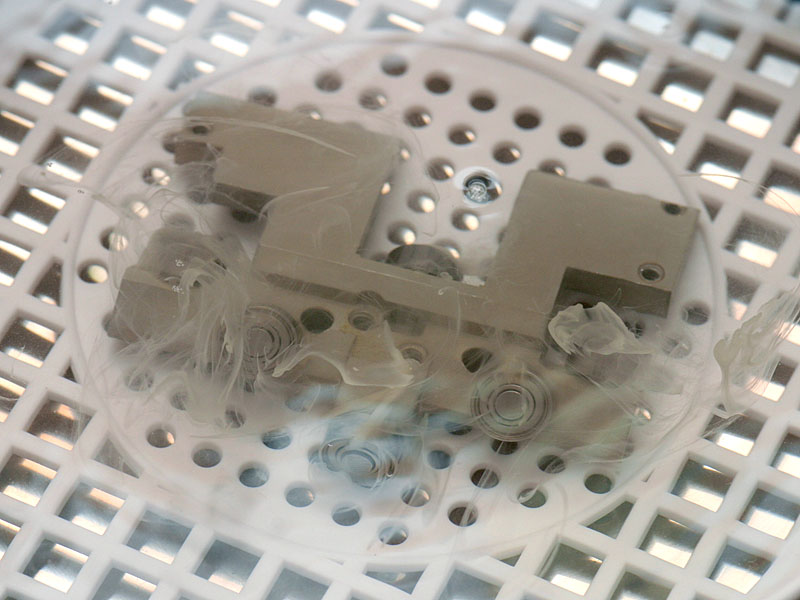
Ultrasonic parts cleaning

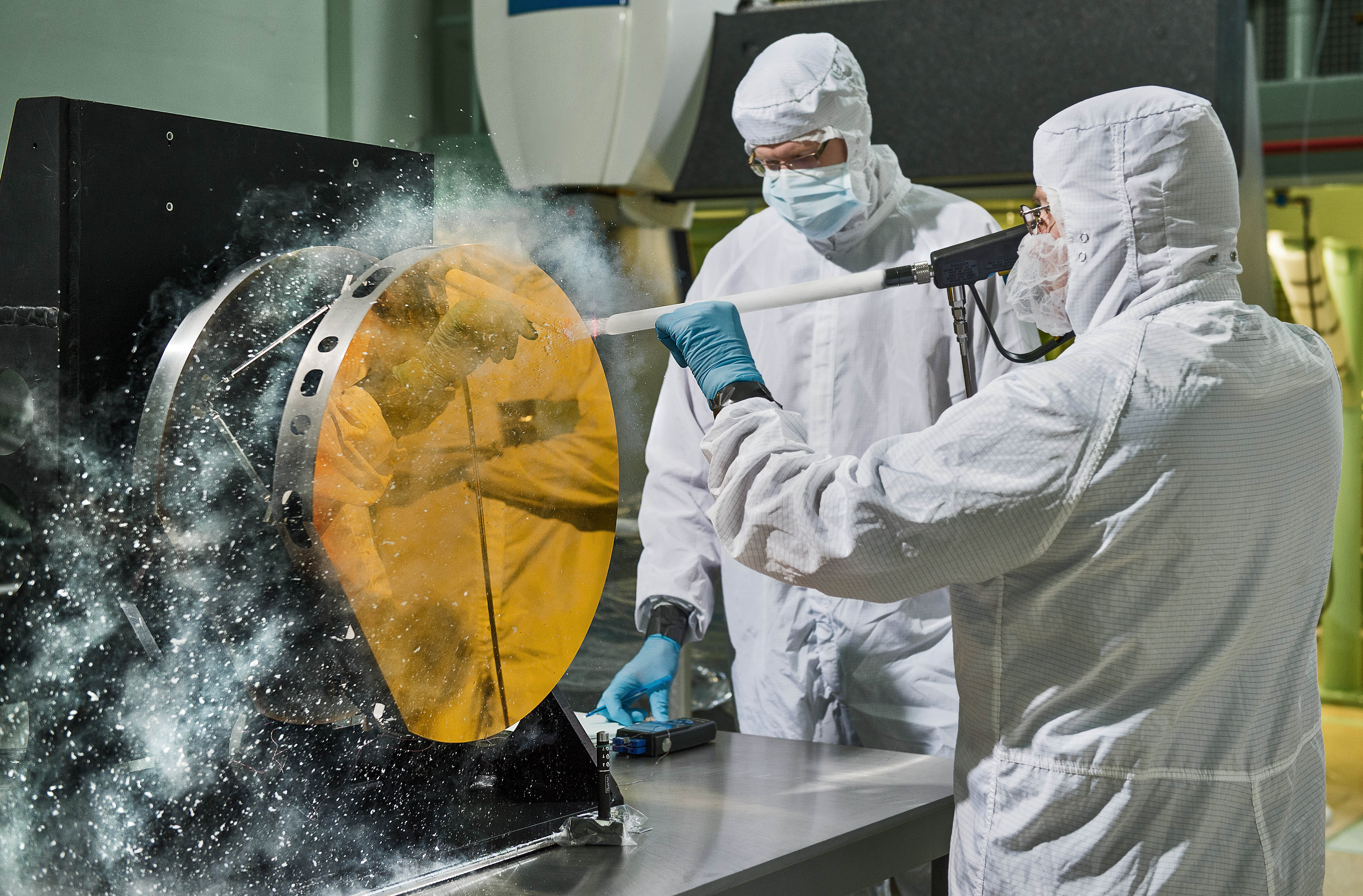
Carbon dioxide snow cleaning in an aerospace setting

Cleaning is the process of removing unwanted substances, such as dirt, dust, and other impurities, from an object or environment. Cleaning is often performed for aesthetic, hygienic, functional, safety, or environmental protection purposes. Cleaning occurs in many different physical contexts, and uses many different methods. Several occupations are devoted to cleaning.

== Contexts ==
Cleaning occurs in various commercial, domestic, personal, and environmental contexts, which differ in scale and requirements.

- Commercial cleaning, in business or other commercial settings
  - Terminal cleaning, in healthcare settings
- Housekeeping, including spring cleaning
- Hygiene, including personal grooming
- Environmental remediation, the removal of pollution or contaminants from the natural environment

== Methods ==
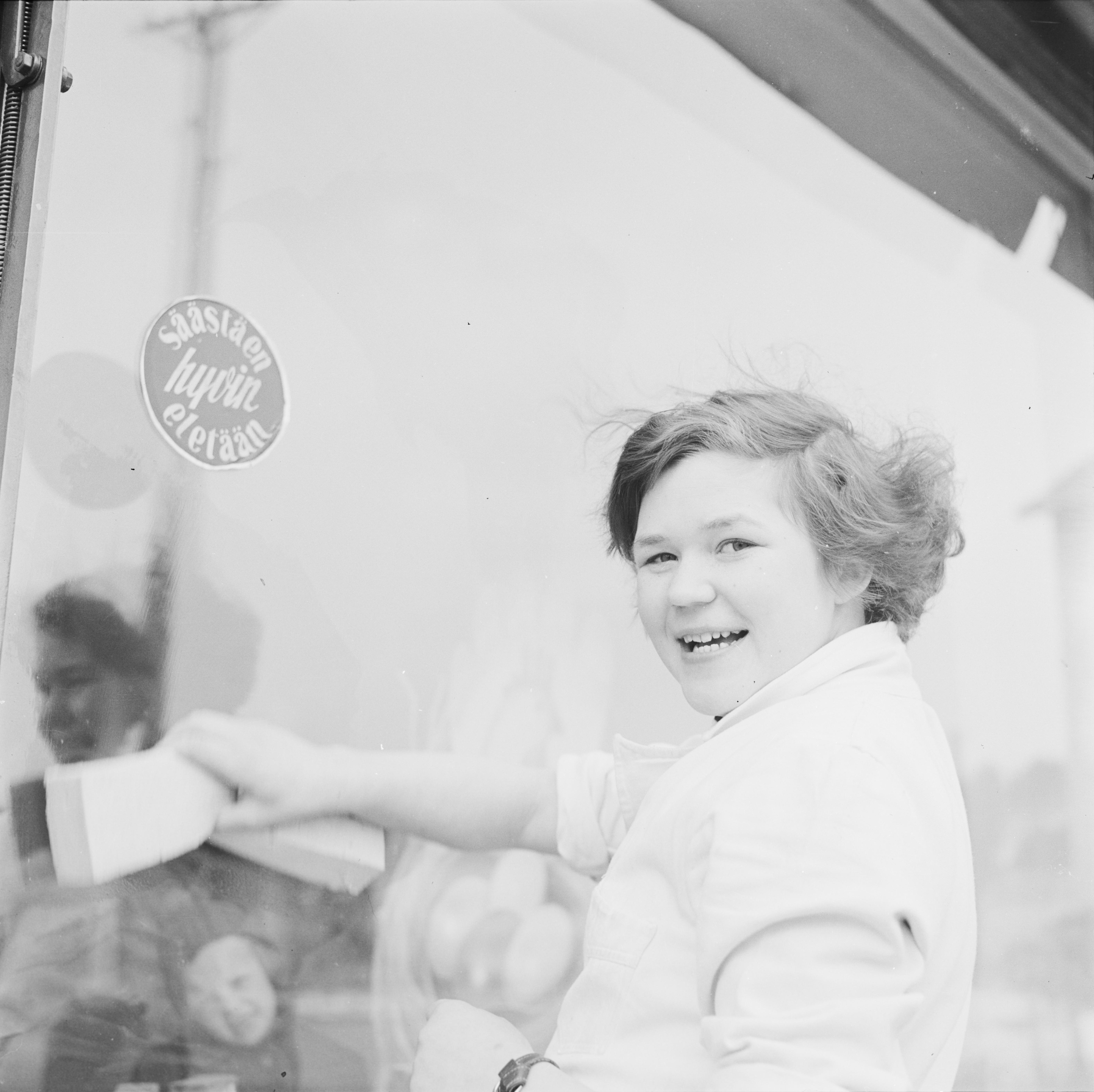
A shop assistant washing a shop window in Jyväskylä, Finland, in the 1960s

Cleaning is broadly achieved through mechanical action and/or chemical processes (usually solvation); many methods rely on a combination of mechanical and chemical action. Methods include:

- Washing, usually done with water and often some kind of soap or detergent
  - Mopping, usually using a mop
  - Wiping, usually using a dry or moist piece of cloth (such as toilet paper, paper towel and wet wipe)
  - Pressure washing, using a high-pressure stream of water
  - Wet cleaning, methods of professional laundering that avoid the use of chemical solvents
- Abrasive blasting, typically used to remove bulk material from a surface, may be used to remove contaminants as well
- Acoustic cleaning, the use of sound waves to shake particulates loose from surfaces
  - Ultrasonic cleaning, using ultrasound, usually from 20 to 400 kHz
  - Megasonic cleaning, a gentler mechanism than ultrasonic cleaning, used in wafer, medical implant, and industrial part cleaning
- Carbon dioxide cleaning, a family of methods for parts cleaning and sterilization using carbon dioxide in its various phases
- Dry cleaning of clothing and textiles, using a chemical solvent other than water
- Flame cleaning of structural steel, with an oxyacetylene flame
- Green cleaning, using environmentally friendly methods and products
- Plasma cleaning, using energetic plasma or dielectric barrier discharge plasma created from various gases
- Sputter cleaning, performed in a vacuum by using physical sputtering of the surface
- Steam cleaning, in both domestic and industrial contexts
- Sweeping, mechanical removal usually using a brush
- Thermal cleaning, in industrial settings, involving pyrolysis and oxidation
- Ultraviolet germicidal irradiation, which destroys microorganisms; used extensively in the medical and food industries
- Vacuum cleaning, using a vacuum cleaner

== Cleaning by item ==
Surface cleaning in art conservation

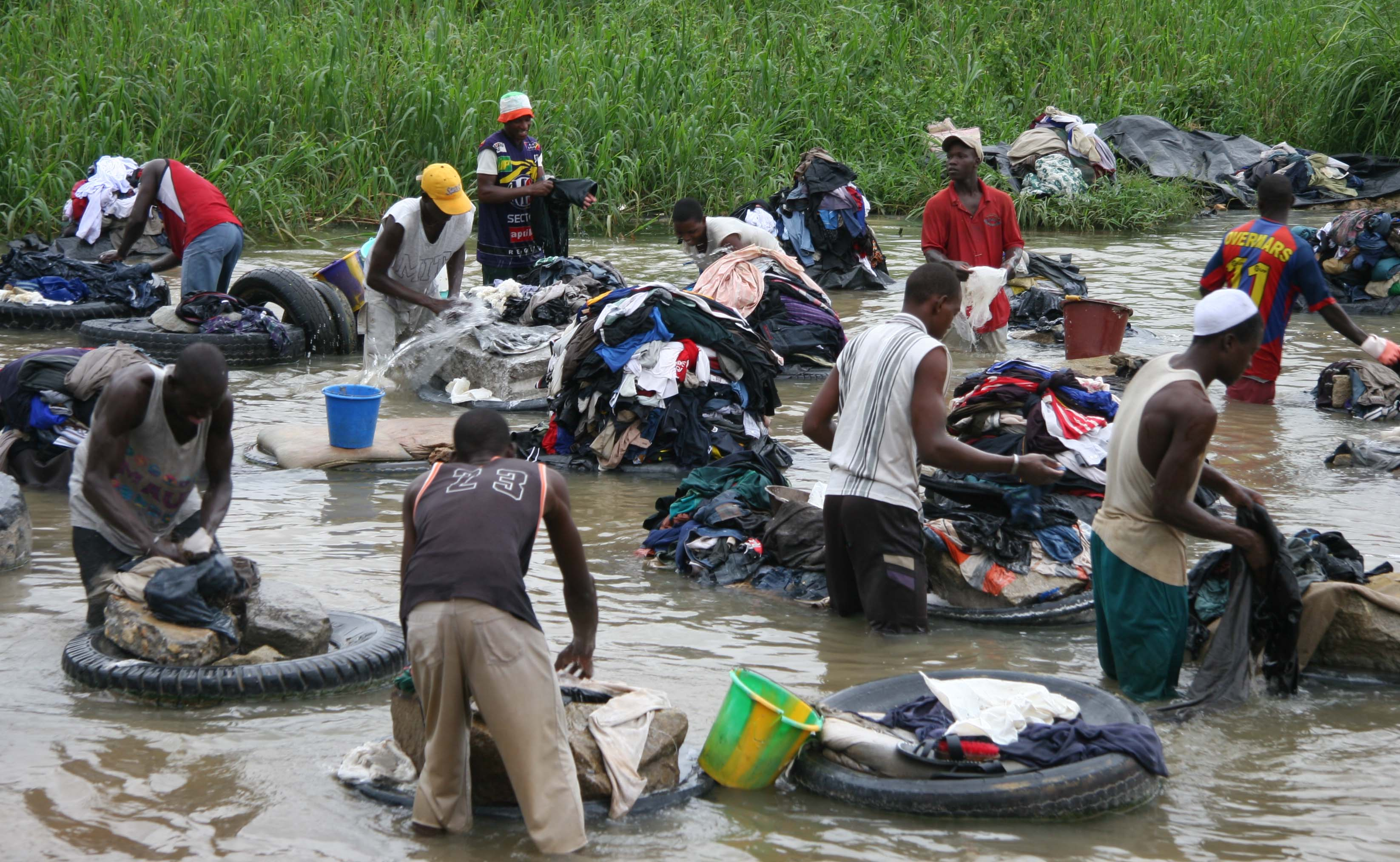
Laundry in a river

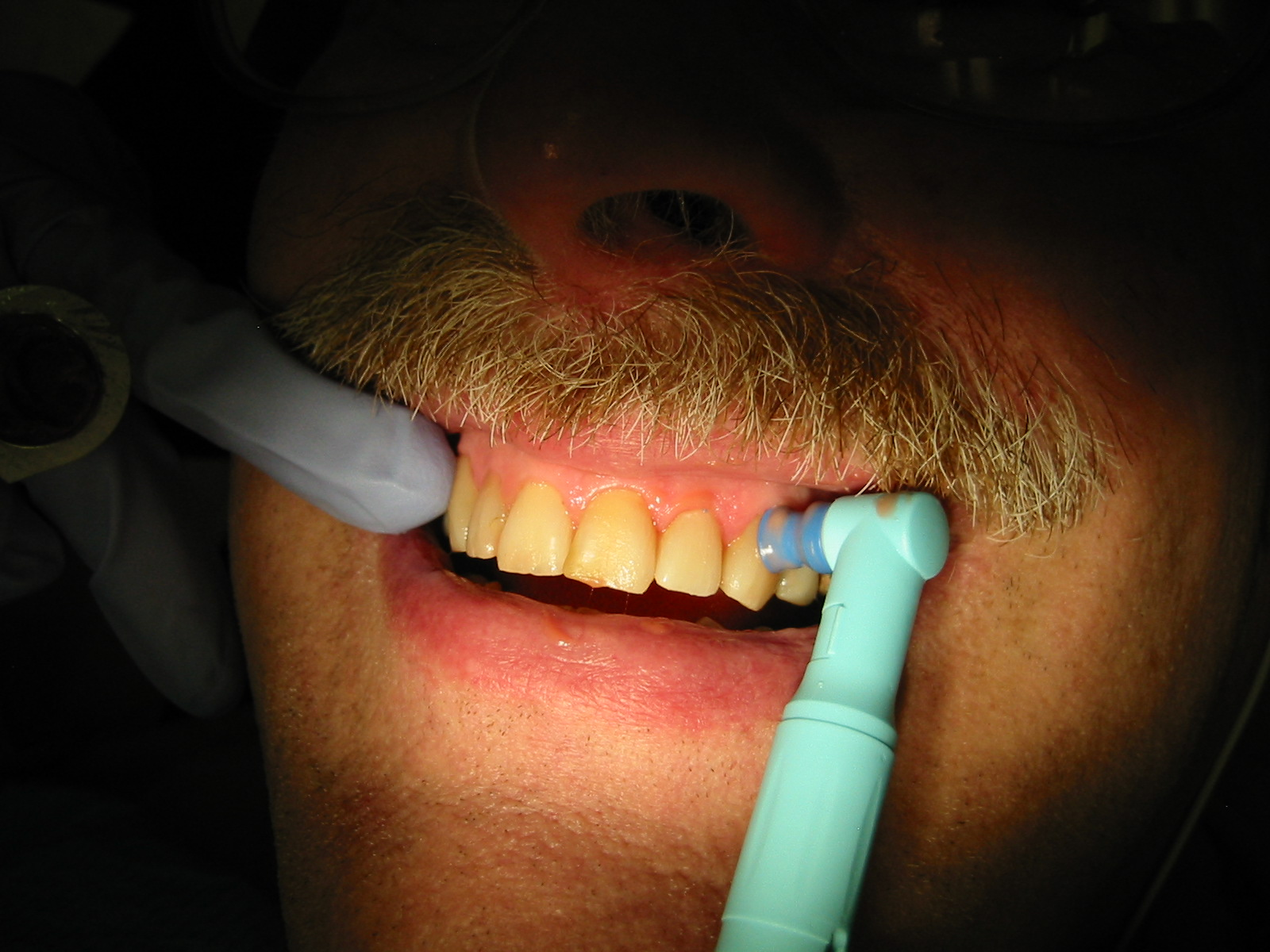
Teeth cleaning

Some items and materials require specialized cleaning techniques, due to their shape, size, location, or the material properties of the object and contaminants.

=== Buildings and infrastructure ===
- Beach cleaning
- Carpet cleaning
- Chimney cleaning
- Crime scene cleanup
- Exterior cleaning
- Floor cleaning
- Graffiti removal
- Roof cleaning
- Silo cleaning
- Street cleaning

=== Other items ===
- Coin cleaning
- Conservation and restoration of cultural property, which often involves careful cleaning
- Jewellery cleaning
- Laundry, the washing of clothes and other textiles
- Parts cleaning, in industry
- Pot washing, in food service
- Teeth cleaning
- Tube cleaning

== Occupations involving cleaning ==
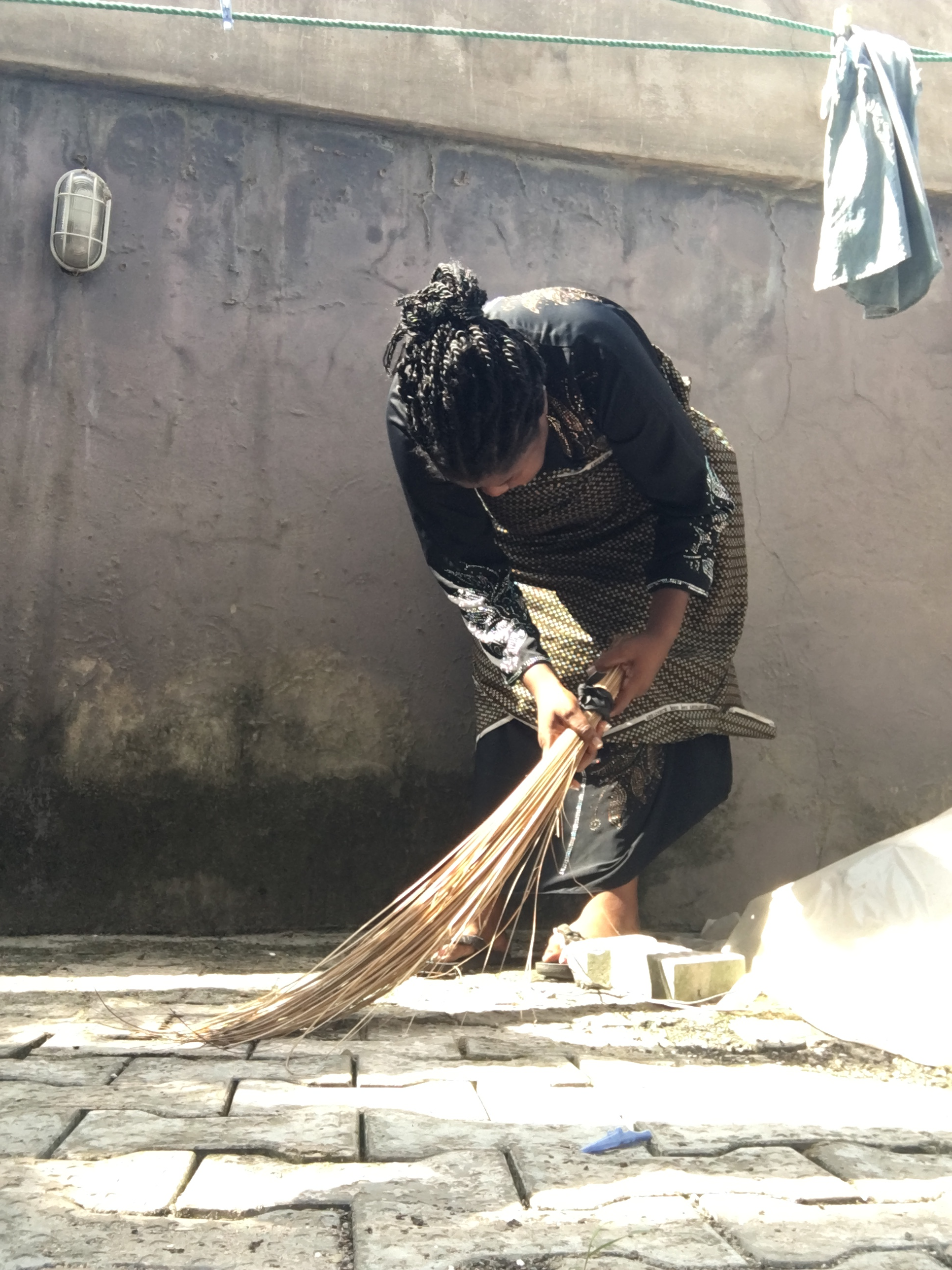
Sweeping

Many occupations involve cleaning, either in their entirety or among other duties, including:

- Cleaner
- Dental hygenist
- Housekeeper (domestic worker)
- Janitor
- Maid
- Property caretaker
- Property manager

== See also ==
=== General ===
- Cleaning (disambiguation), for other uses of the term
- Cleanliness, an abstract concept for a state that may be achieved by cleaning
- Cleaning agent, substances used in cleaning
- Contamination control, of which cleaning is a part

=== Biology and health ===
- Cleaning symbiosis, among living creatures
- Hygiene, a set of practices performed for the preservation of health
- Sanitation, techniques to protect human health by providing a clean environment
- Sterilization (microbiology), the elimination or deactivation of biological agents

=== Organizing ===
- Professional organizing, improvement of organizing systems and processes
- Sorting, any process of arranging items systematically

=== Technologies ===
- Cleanroom, a room with low levels of particulates, used in specialized manufacturing or research
- Automated pool cleaner
- Central vacuum cleaner
- Robotic vacuum cleaner
- Self-cleaning floor
- Self-cleaning glass
- Self-cleaning oven

=== Other contexts ===
- Cleaning event, in which solar panels on planetary rovers are cleaned by wind
- Cleaning validation, used to assure that manufacturing residues are removed
