= Parts cleaning =

Parts cleaning is essential in many industrial processes, as a prelude to surface finishing or to protect sensitive components. Electroplating is particularly sensitive to part cleanliness, since molecular layers of oil can prevent the coating adhesion.

Cleaning processes include solvent cleaning, hot alkaline detergent cleaning, electro-cleaning, and acid etch. The most common industrial tests for cleanliness of machinery is the water-break test, in which the surface is thoroughly rinsed and vertically held. A quantitative measurement for this parameter is the contact angle. Hydrophobic contaminants such as oils cause the water to bead and break up, allowing the water to drain rapidly. Perfectly clean metal surfaces are hydrophilic and will keep an unbroken sheet of water that does not bead up or drain off.

== Definitions and classifications ==
For the activities described here, the following terms are often found: metal cleaning, metal surface cleaning, component cleaning, degreasing, parts washing, and parts cleaning. These are well established in technical language usage, but they have their shortcomings. Metal cleaning can easily be mixed up with the refinement of un-purified metals. Metal surface cleaning and metal cleaning do not consider the increasing usage of plastics and composite materials in this sector. The term component cleaning leaves out the cleaning of steel sections and sheets, and finally, degreasing only describes a part of the topic, as in most cases, chips, fines, particles, salts, etc. also have to be removed.

The terms "commercial and industrial parts cleaning", "parts cleaning in craft and industry", or "commercial parts cleaning" probably best describe this field of activity. There are some specialists who prefer the term "industrial parts cleaning", because they want to exclude maintenance of buildings, rooms, areas, windows, floors, tanks, machinery, hygiene, hands washing, showers, and other non-commercial objects.

== Elements and their interactions ==
Factors

Cleaning activities in this sector can only be characterized sufficiently by a description of several factors. These are outlined in the first image above.

=== Parts and materials to be cleaned ===
First, consider the parts to be cleaned. They may comprise non-processed or hardly processed sections, sheets and wires, but also machined parts or assembled components needing cleaning. Therefore, they may be composed of different metals or different combinations of metals. Plastics and composite materials can frequently be found and indeed are on the increase because, e.g. the automobile industry, as well as others, are using more and lighter materials.

Mass can be very important for the selection of cleaning methods. For example, big shafts for ships are usually cleaned manually, whereas tiny shafts for electrical appliances are often cleaned in bulk in highly automated plants.

Similarly important is the geometry of the parts. Long, thin, branching, threaded holes, which could contain jammed chips, feature among the greatest challenges in this technical field. High pressure and the power wash process are one way to remove these chips, as well as robots, which are programmed to exactly flush the drilled holes under high pressure.

=== Contaminations ===
The parts are usually covered by unwanted substances, contaminants, or soiling. The definition used is quite different. In certain cases, these coverings may be desired: e.g. one may not wish to remove a paint layer but only the material on top. In another cases, where crack proofing is necessary, one has to remove the paint layer, as it is regarded as an unwanted substance.

The classification of soiling follows the layer structure, starting from the base material:

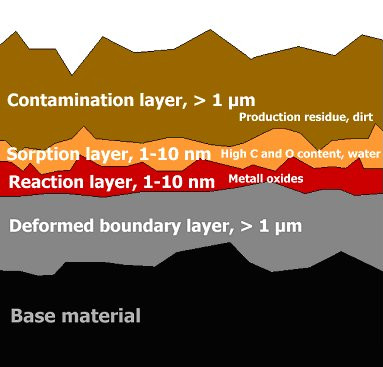
Structure of a metallic surface

- Deformed boundary layer, > 1 μm
- Reaction layer, 1–10 nm
- Sorption layer, 1–10 nm
- Contamination layer, > 1 μm

See illustration 2: Structure of a metallic surface

The closer a layer is to the substrate surface, the more energy is needed to remove it. Correspondingly, the cleaning itself can be structured according to the type of energy input:

- Mechanical – abrasive: blasting, grinding
- Mechanical – non-abrasive: stirring, mixing, ultrasound, spraying
- Thermal – reactive: heat treatment much above 100 °C in reactive gases
- Thermal – non-reactive: temperature below 100 °C, increased bath temperature, vapor degreasing
- Chemical – abrasive/reactive: pickling in liquids, plasma-assisted, sputter-cleaning, electropolishing
- Chemical – non-reactive: organic solvents, aqueous solutions, supercritical CO_{2}

The contamination layer may then be further classified according to:

- Origin
- Composition: e.g. cooling lubricants may be composed differently. Single components may account for big problems, especially for job shop cleaners, who have no control over prior processes and thus don't know the contaminants. For example, silicates may obstruct nitriding.
- State of aggregation
- Chemical and physical properties

The American Society for Testing and Materials (ASTM) presents six groups of contaminations in their manual "Choosing a cleaning process" and relates them to the most common cleaning methods, the suitability of cleaning methods for the removal of a given contaminate is discussed. In addition, they list exemplary cleaning processes for different typical applications. Since one has to consider very many different aspects when choosing a process, this can only serve as a first orientation. The groups of contaminants are stated:

- Pigmented drawing compounds
- Unpigmented oil and grease
- Chips and cutting fluids
- Polishing and buffing compounds
- Rust and scale
- Others

=== Charging ===
In order to select suitable equipment and media, it should be known also which amount and which throughput have to be handled. In larger factories, little amounts are virtually ever cleaned economically. Additionally, the pricing method needs to be determined. Sensitive parts sometimes need to be fixed in boxes. When dealing with large amounts, bulk charging can be used, but it's difficult to achieve a sufficient level of cleanliness with flat pieces clinging together. Drying can also be difficult in these cases.

=== Place of cleaning ===
Another consideration is the place of cleaning. Cleaning in a workshop calls for different methods as compared to cleaning that is to be done on site, which can be the case with maintenance and repair work.

Usually, the cleaning takes place in a workshop. Several common methods include solvent degreasing, vapor degreasing, and the use of an aqueous parts washer. Companies often want the charging, loading and unloading to be integrated into the production line, which is much more demanding as regards size and throughout the ability of the cleaning system.

Such cleaning systems often exactly match the requirements regarding parts, contaminants and charging methods (special production). Central cleaning equipment, often built as multi task systems, is commonly used. These systems can suit different cleaning requirements. Typical examples are the wash stands or the small cleaning machines, which are found in many industrial plants.

=== Cleaning equipment and procedure ===
First, one can differentiate among the following techniques (ordered from most to least technologically advanced):

- Manual
- Mechanical
- Automatic
- Robot supported

The process may be performed in one step, which is especially true for the manual cleaning, but typically it requires several steps. Therefore, it is not uncommon to find 10 to 20 steps in large plants, e.g., for the medical and optical industry. This can be especially complex because non-cleaning steps may be integrated in such plants like application of corrosion protection layers or phosphating. Cleaning can also be simple: the cleaning processes are integrated into other processes, as it is the case with electroplating or galvanising, where it usually serves as a pre-treatment step.

The following procedure is quite common:

1. Pre-cleaning
2. Main cleaning
3. Rinsing
4. Rinsing with deionised water
5. Rinsing with corrosion protection
6. Drying

Each of these steps may take place in its own bath, chamber, or, in case of spray cleaning, in its own zone (line or multi-chamber equipment). But often these steps may have a single chamber into which the respective media are pumped in (single chamber plant).

Cleaning media plays an important role as it removes the contaminants from the substrate.

For liquid media, the following cleaners can be used: aqueous agents, semi-aqueous agents (an emulsion of solvents and water), hydrocarbon-based solvents, and halogenated solvents. Usually, the latter are referred to as chlorinated agents, but brominated and fluorinated substances can be used. The traditionally used chlorinated agents, TCE and PCE, which are hazardous, are now only applied in airtight plants and the modern volume shift systems limit any emissions. In the group of hydrocarbon-based solvents, there are some newly developed agents like fatty acid esters made of natural fats and oils, modified alcohols and dibasic esters.

Aqueous cleaners are mostly a combination of various substances like alkaline builders, surfactants, and sequestering agents. With ferrous metal cleaning, rust inhibitors are added into the aqueous cleaner to prevent flash rusting after washing. Their use is on the rise as their results have proven to be most times as good or better than hydrocarbon cleaners. The waste generated is less hazardous, which reduces disposal costs.

Aqueous cleaners have advantages as regards particle and polar contaminants and only require higher inputs of mechanical and thermal energy to be effective, whereas solvents more easily remove oils and greases but have health and environmental risks. In addition, most solvents are flammable, creates fire and explosion hazards. Nowadays, with proper industrial parts washer equipment, it is accepted that aqueous cleaners remove oil and grease as easily as solvents.

Another approach is with solid cleaning media (blasting) which comprises the CO_{2} dry ice process: For tougher requirements, pellets are used while for more sensitive materials or components CO_{2} in form of snow is applied. One drawback is the high energy consumption required to make dry ice.

Last but not least, there are processes with no media like vibration, laser, brushing and blow/exhaust systems.

All cleaning steps are characterized by media and applied temperatures and their individual agitation/application (mechanical impact). There is a wide range of different methods and combinations of these methods:

- Blasting
- Boiling under pressure
- Carbon dioxide cleaning
- Circulation of bath
- Flooding
- Gas or air injection into bath
- Hydroson
- Injection flooding
- Megasonic, see megasonic cleaning
- Movement of parts (turning, oscillating, pivoting)
- Power wash process
- Pressure flooding
- Spraying
- Sprinkling
- Ultrasonic, see ultrasonic cleaning

Finally, every cleaning step is described by the time which the parts to be cleaned spends in the respective zone, bath, or chamber, and thus medium, temperature, and agitation can affect the contamination.

Every item of cleaning equipment needs a so-called periphery. This term describes measures and equipment on the one hand side to maintain and control baths and side to protect human beings and the environment.

In most plants, the cleaning agents are circulated until their cleaning power has eventually decreased and reached the maximum tolerable contaminant level. In order to delay the bath exchange as much as possible, there are sophisticated treatment attachments in use, removing contaminants and the used up agents from the system. Fresh cleaning agents or parts thereof have to be supplemented, which requires a bath control. The latter is more and more facilitated online and thus allows a computer aided change of the bath. With the help of oil separators, demulsifying agents and evaporators, aqueous processes can be conducted 'wastewater free'. Complete exchange of baths becomes only necessary every 3 to 12 months.

When using organic solvents, the preferred method to achieve a long operating bath life is distillation, an especially effective method to separate contaminants and agents.

The periphery also includes measures to protect the workers like encapsulation, automatic shutoff of power supply, automatic refill and sharpening of media (e.g., gas shuttle technique), explosion prevention measures, exhaust ventilation etc., and also measures to protect the environment, e.g. capturing of volatile solvents, impounding basins, extraction, treatment and disposal of resulting wastes. Solvents based cleaning processes have the advantage that the dirt and the cleaning agent can be more easily separated, whereas in aqueous processes is more complex.

In processes without cleaning media, like laser ablation and vibration cleaning, only the removed dirt has to be disposed of as there is no cleaning agent. Quite little waste is generated in processes like CO_{2} blasting and automatic brush cleaning at the expense of higher energy costs.

=== Quality requirements ===
A standardization of the quality requirements for cleaned surfaces regarding the following process (e.g. coating, heat treatment) or from the point of view of technical functionality is difficult. However, it is possible to use general classifications. In Germany, it was attempted to define cleaning as a subcategory of metal treatment (DIN 8592: Cleaning as sub category of cutting processes), but this does not cope with all the complexities of cleaning.

The rather general rules include the classification in intermediate cleaning, final cleaning, precision cleaning and critical cleaning (s. table), in practice seen only as a general guideline.

Terms	Max. allowed dirt	Soils removed	Explanations
Intermediate cleaning			E.g. in metal cutting manufacturing
Final cleaning	≤ 500 mg / m² (1)	Mil-sized particles and residues thicker than a monolayer	E.g. before assembling or coating
Parts for phosphating, painting, enamelling	500 - ≤ 5 mg C / m² (2)		
Parts for case-hardening, nitriding, nitro carburising resp. vacuum treatment	500 - ≤ 5 mg C / m² (2)		
Parts for electroplating, electronic parts	20 - ≤ 5 mg C / m² (2)		
Precision cleaning	≤ 50 mg / m² (1)	Supermicrometre particles and residues thinner than a monolayer	Controlled environment (Durkee)
Critical cleaning	≤ 5 mg / m² (1)	Sub-micrometre particles and non-volatile residue measured in Angstroms	cleanroom (Durkee)

(1) Related to the total dirt; (2) Only related to carbon

Thus, the rule of thumb is still followed, stating that the quality requirements are met if the subsequent process (see below) does not cause any problems. For example, a paint coating does not flake off before the guarantee period ends.

Where this is not sufficient, especially in case of external orders, because of missing standards, there are often specific customer requirements regarding remaining contamination, corrosion protection, spots and gloss level, etc.

Measuring methods to ensure quality therefore do not play a bigger role in the workshops, although there are a broad scale of different methods, from visual control over simple testing methods (water break test, wipe test, measurement of contact angle, test inks, tape test, among others) to complex analysis methods (gravimetric test, particle counting, infrared spectroscopy, glow discharge spectroscopy, energy dispersive X-ray analysis, scanning electron microscopy and electrochemical methods, among others). There are only a few methods, which can be applied directly in the line and which offer reproducible and comparable results. It was not until recently that bigger advancements in this area have been made

The general situation has changed, meanwhile, because of dramatically rising cleanliness requirements for certain components in the automotive industry. For example, brake systems and fuel-injection systems need to be fitted with increasingly smaller diameters and they have to withstand increasingly higher pressures. Therefore, a very minor particle contamination may lead to big problems. Because of the rising innovation speed, the industry cannot afford to identify possible failures at a relatively late stage. Therefore, the standard VDA 19/ISO 16232 'Road Vehicles – Cleanliness of Components of Fluid Circuits' was developed which describes methods that can control the compliance with the cleanliness requirements.

=== Subsequent process ===
When choosing cleaning techniques, cleaning agents and cleaning processes, the subsequent processes, i.e. the further processing of the cleaned parts, is of special interest.

The classification follows basically the metal work theory:

- Machining
- Cutting
- Joining
- Coating
- Heat treatment
- Assembling
- Measuring, testing
- Repairing, maintenance

In time, empirical values were established, how efficient the cleaning has to be, to assure the processes for the particular guarantee period and beyond. Choosing the cleaning method often starts from here.

== Challenges and trends ==
The details above illustrate how extremely complex this specific field is. Small variations in requirements can cause completely different processes. It becomes more and more important to receive the required cleanliness as cost-effective as possible and with continuously minimized health and environmental risks, because cleaning has become of central importance for the supply chain in manufacturing. Applying companies usually rely on their suppliers, who—because of a big experience base—suggest adequate equipment and processes, which are then adapted to the detailed requirements in tests stations at the supplier's premises. However, they are limited to their scope of technology. To put practitioners in a position to consider all relevant possibilities meeting their requirements, some institutes have developed different tools:

SAGE: Unfortunately, no longer in operation, the comprehensive expert system for parts cleaning and degreasing provided a graded list with relatively general processes of solvent and process alternatives. Developed by the Surface Cleaning Program at the Research Triangle Institute, Raleigh, North Carolina, USA, in cooperation with the U.S. EPA (used to be available under: http://clean.rti.org/).

Cleantool: A 'Best Practice' database in seven languages with comprehensive and specific processes, directly recorded in companies. It contains furthermore an integrated evaluation tool, which covers the areas of technology, quality, health and safety at work, environmental protection and costs. Also included is a comprehensive glossary (seven languages, link see below).

Bauteilreinigung: A selection system for component cleaning developed by the University of Dortmund, assisting the users to analyze their cleaning tasks regarding the suitable cleaning processes and cleaning agents (German only, link see below).

TURI, Toxic Use Reduction Institute: A department of the University of Lowell, Massachusetts (USA). TURI's laboratory has been conducting evaluations on alternative cleaning products since 1993. A majority of these products were designed for metal surface cleaning. The results are available on-line through the Institute's laboratory database.

== See also ==
- Acoustic cleaning
- Brake cleaner
- Parts washer
- Solvent degreasing
- Sonication
- Ultrasonic cleaning
- Vapor degreasing
- Bioremediation
