= Brake cleaner =

Cleaning agent for motor vehicles

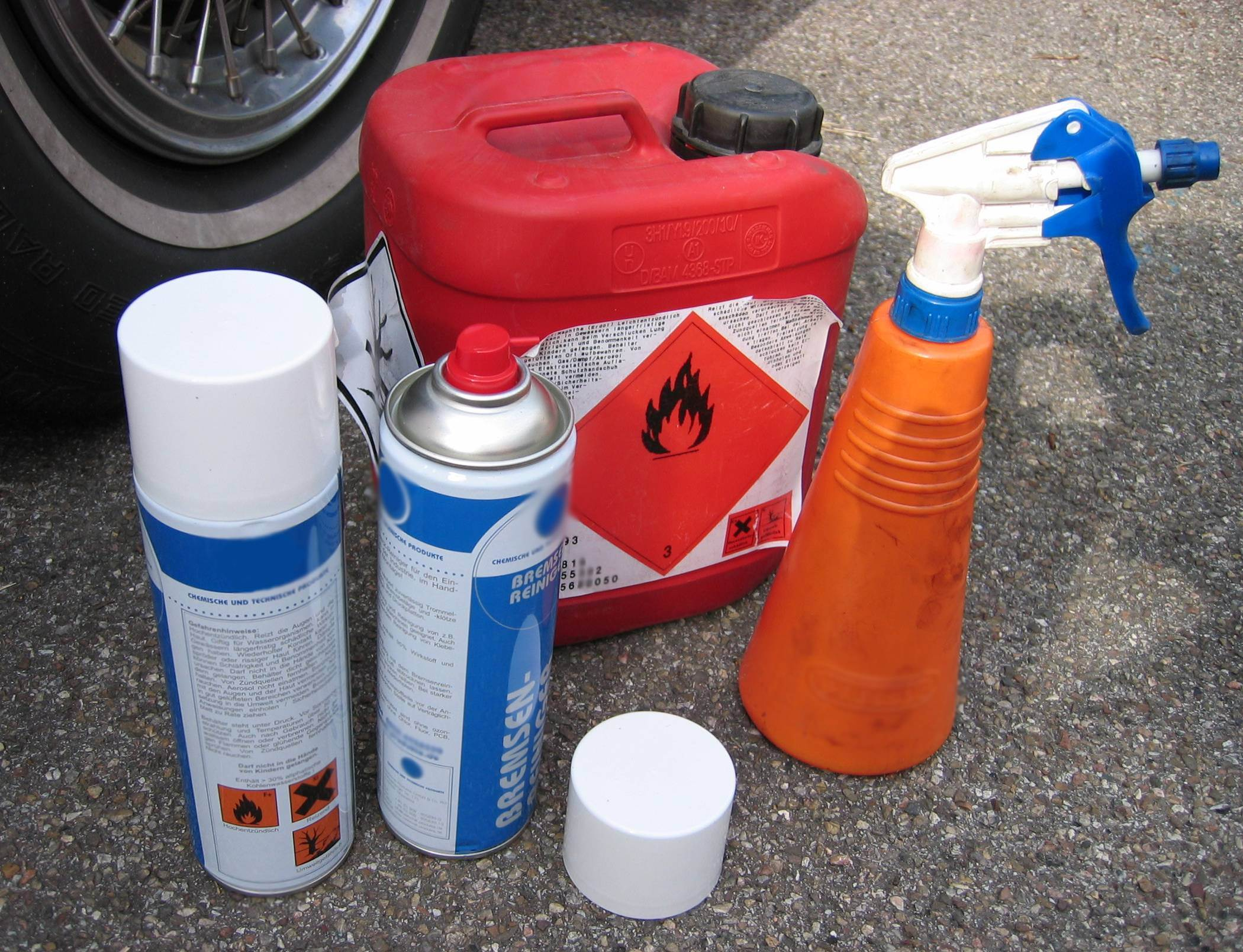
Brake cleaner in different containers

Brake cleaner is a mostly colorless cleaning agent, designed for cleaning brake dust from the brake disks and other components of motor vehicles. It is also frequently used for cleaning other parts including the engine compartment as a general parts cleaner, although this is not a recommended use case by most manufacturers. An important feature is that the brake cleaner leaves no residue after the solvents evaporate.

== Composition ==
Chlorinated brake cleaners (often sold as non-flammable) use organochlorides like tetrachloroethylene and dichloromethane. Historically 1,1,1-trichloroethane was used, sometimes together with tetrachloroethylene. It was phased out because of its ozone-depleting nature.

Non-chlorinated brake cleaners use hydrocarbons as a main component; either a low-boiling aliphatic compound or a higher-boiling hydrocarbon mixture. Aromatics like benzene, toluene or xylene may also be used. The hydrocarbons used are sometimes made by hydrogenation from naphtha. The lipophilic liquids dissolve fat-soluble lubricants or oils. Some products also contain polar solvents such as ethanol, methanol, isopropanol, and acetone in order to dissolve non-lipophilic substances. Many formulations are incompatible with various materials, especially plastics.

== Use ==
The main application of brake cleaners is the degreasing and cleaning of metal parts or metallic surfaces. They are used for removing oils, fats, resins, tar and dust, mainly in motor vehicles.

About 10 million liters are consumed per year in Germany.

== Danger ==
Brake cleaners contain toxic compounds and should be used only in well-ventilated areas or outdoors. Some are highly flammable and harmful for the environment, which also has to be considered during storage. Skin exposure to the solvent mixture may cause irritation and defatting injury. Chlorinated brake cleaners contain chlorinated hydrocarbons, which can produce the highly toxic gas phosgene when exposed to high heat or open flame, such as when welding metal parts that have been cleaned with them.

Brake cleaners decompose rubber and some types of plastics by removing binding components. The rubber appears unchanged at first; however, it will become brittle, and after a few weeks to months cracks and fractures appear.

== Alternatives ==
For frequent and industrial use, cleaning and degreasing may be replaced by supercritical carbon dioxide or dry-ice blasting, which is abrasive. This requires a setup to apply the carbon dioxide. While the harmful vapors are eliminated, the CO_{2} must be ventilated. Applying the carbon dioxide causes electrostatic discharge by the expanding gas. The dust and harmful brake dust is not bound in the liquid.
