= DBE =

DBE may refer to:

== Science and technology ==
- dBe, decibels electrical, a unit of measure which measures the ratio of gain or attenuation of an electrical circuit
- Double bond equivalent, a calculation used in chemistry that determines the total number of rings and π bonds of organic molecules
- DBE (drug), also known as estrobin, a synthetic estrogen
- Dibromoethane, referring to either 1,1-Dibromoethane or 1,2-Dibromoethane, both being isomeric organobromides of each other
- Dibasic ester, an organic chemical compound
- Double-balloon enteroscopy, an endoscopic technique for visualization of the small bowel
- Design-basis event, the event which a nuclear facility is built to withstand
- DBE, Database Engineer, a new title for a Database Administrator (DBA)
- .dbe, a file format extension used by the HP WindowsCE ActiveSync backup software
- Double Buffer Extension, an X Window System extension

== Other uses ==
- Dame Commander of the Most Excellent Order of the British Empire, a grade within the British order of chivalry
- Daughters of the British Empire, women's lineage society based in the United States
- D-Block Europe, a British hip-hop collective
- Department of Basic Education, in the South African Government
- Deutsche Biographische Enzyklopädie, a German encyclopedia
- Disadvantaged business enterprise, a term used in the United States to describe companies that are so certified by state governments
- Dominet Bank Ekstraliga, a Polish basketball league
- Dragonball Evolution, a 2009 film loosely based on the Dragon Ball manga
