= Cleanliness =

Abstract state of being clean and free from dirt

Cleanliness is both the state of being clean and free from germs, dirt, trash, or waste, and the habit of achieving and maintaining that state. Cleanliness is often achieved through cleaning.

In most cultures, cleanliness is considered a good quality, and may be regarded as contributing to other ideals such as health and beauty. The holiness movement § Lifestyle developed a now-widespread aphorism: "Cleanliness is next to Godliness", connecting physical cleanliness to spiritual freedom from sin.

The concept of cleanliness emphasizes an ongoing procedure or set of habits for the purpose of maintenance and prevention. In this it differs from purity, which is a physical, moral, or ritual state of freedom from pollutants. Whereas purity is usually a quality of an individual or substance, cleanliness has a social dimension. "Cleanliness", observed Jacob Burckhardt, "is indispensable to our modern notion of social perfection". A household or workplace may be said to exhibit cleanliness, but ordinarily not purity. Cleanliness is also a characteristic of people who maintain cleanness or prevent dirtying.

Cleanliness is related to hygiene and disease prevention. Washing is one way of achieving physical cleanliness, usually with water and often some kind of soap or detergent. Cleaning procedures are also important in many forms of manufacturing.

As an assertion of moral superiority or respectability, cleanliness has played a role in establishing cultural values in relation to social class, humanitarianism, and cultural imperialism.

== Hygiene ==
Since the germ theory of disease, cleanliness has come to mean an effort to remove germs and other hazardous materials. A reaction to an excessive desire for a germ-free environment began around 1989, when David Strachan put forth the "hygiene hypothesis" in the British Medical Journal. This hypothesis holds that environmental microbes help develop the human immune system; the fewer germs people are exposed to in early childhood, the more likely they are to experience certain health problems in childhood and as adults. However, the valuation of cleanliness also has a social and cultural dimension beyond the requirements of hygiene for practical purposes.

== Industry ==
Certain processes in industry, such as those related to integrated circuit manufacturing, require exceptionally clean conditions, which are maintained by working in cleanrooms. Cleanliness is essential to successful electroplating, since molecular layers of oil can prevent adhesion of the coating. The industry has developed specialized techniques for parts cleaning, as well as tests for cleanliness. The most commonly used tests rely on the wetting behaviour of a clean hydrophilic metal surface. Cleanliness is important to vacuum systems to reduce outgassing. Cleanliness is crucial for semiconductor manufacturing.

== Ethics ==
Some studies show a positive correlation between cleanliness and ethical judgements.

== Religion ==
=== In Christianity ===
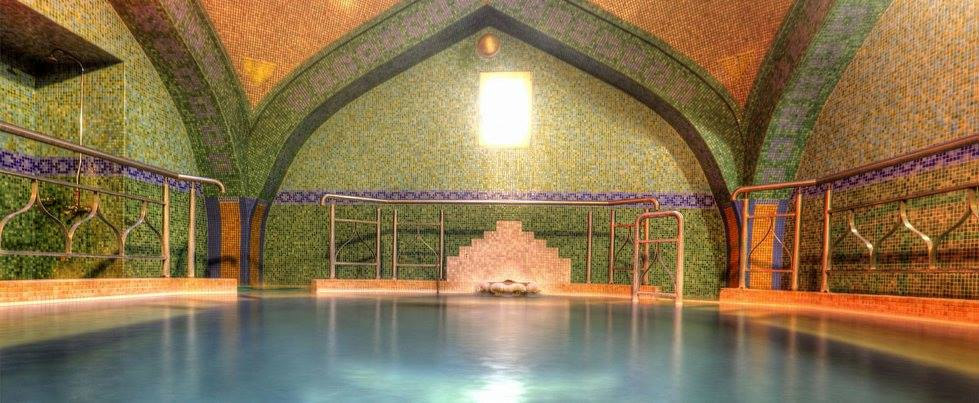
Agkistro Byzantine bath.

The Bible contains descriptions of many rituals of purification relating to menstruation, childbirth, sexual relations, skin disease, death, animal sacrifices, and toilet etiquette. Certain Christian rules of purity have implications for bodily hygiene and observing cleanliness, including sexual hygiene, menstruation and toilet etiquette. In certain denominations of Christianity, cleanliness includes a number of regulations involving cleanliness before prayer, observing days of ritual purification, as well as those concerning diet and apparel. The Ethiopian Orthodox Tewahedo Church prescribes several kinds of hand washing, for example after leaving the latrine, lavatory, or bathhouse, or before prayer, or after eating a meal. Women in the Ethiopian Orthodox Tewahedo Church are prohibited from entering the church temple during menses; and men do not enter a church the day after they have had intercourse with their wives.

Christianity has always placed a strong emphasis on hygiene, despite the denunciation of the mixed bathing style of Roman pools by early Christian clergy, as well as the pagan custom of women naked bathing in front of men, this did not stop the Church from urging its followers to go to public baths for bathing, which contributed to hygiene and good health according to the Church Father, Clement of Alexandria. The Didascalia Apostolorum, an early Christian manual, enjoined Christians to bathe themselves in those facilities that were separated by sex. The Church also built public bathing facilities that were sex-segregated near monasteries and pilgrimage sites. The popes situated baths within church basilicas and monasteries since the early Middle Ages. Pope Gregory the Great urged his followers on value of bathing as a bodily need. Public bathhouse were common in medieval Christendom larger towns and cities such as Constantinople, Rome, Paris, Regensburg and Naples.

Around the time of Tertullian, an early Church Father, it was customary for Christians to wash their hands (manulavium), face (capitilavium) and feet (pedilavium) before prayer, as well as before receiving Holy Communion. The rite of footwashing employed a basin of water and linen towels, done in the imitation of Christ. A major contribution of the Christian missionaries in Africa, Asia and other places was better health care of the people through hygiene and introducing and distributing the soaps.

=== In Hinduism ===
In Hinduism, cleanliness is an important virtue. The Bhagavad Gita describes it as one of the divine qualities which one must practice. The Sanskrit word for cleanliness is śauca. The Bhagavad Gita repeats this word in five slokas at 13.8, 16.3, 16.7, 17.14 and 18.42. Śrīmad Bhāgavatam mentioned śauca at 1.16.26, 1.17.24 (as one of the four legs of Satya Yuga or Golden Age), 1.17.42, 3.28.4 (as spiritual practice), 3.31.33 (those who are addicted to sex life will not understand cleanliness), 4.29.84 (purity of ātman), 7.11.8–12 (one of the thirty qualities to be acquired), 7.11.21 (cleanliness as a characteristic of a Brahmin), 7.11.24 (cleanliness is a quality of the best worker), 11.3.24 (one should learn cleanliness to serve his or her guru), 11.17.16 (cleanliness is a natural quality of a Brahmin), 11.18.36 (cleanliness as a virtue among those who has realised God), 11.18.43 (quality to be practised by a householder), 11.21.14 (means of cleansing one body and mind), 11.19.36–39 (cleanliness means detachment from desire-prompted actions) 12.2.1 (effects of Kali Yuga on cleanliness).

Śrīmad Bhāgavatam also recognises cleanliness as one of the thirty qualities which one must acquire to obtain the grace of God and identifies internal and external cleanliness among the twelve regular duties. Cleanliness is also an exalted quality which characterises the Satya Yuga (Golden Age) in Hinduism.

Service of the Devas (gods), holy men, teachers, parents, and wise persons, as also the observance of cleanliness, uprightness, continence, and non-injury—these constitute austerities [tapa] pertaining to the body.

— Bhagavad Gita 17.14

Cleanliness or śauca is both internal and external. Hinduism extols not only external cleanliness but also internal cleanliness or purity. Since the minds of devotees (bhakta) are constantly absorbed in the all-pure lord, they become internally cleansed from the defects (kleśa) of lust, anger, greed, envy, ego, etc. In this state of mind, they naturally prefer to keep the external body and environment pure as well. Thus, in accordance with the old saying, "cleanliness is next to godliness", they are also externally pure. Śrīmad Bhāgavatam explains the internal and external cleanliness as:

My dear Uddhava, general cleanliness, washing the hands, bathing, performing religious services at sunrise, noon and sunset, worshiping Me, visiting holy places, chanting japa, avoiding that which is untouchable, uneatable, or not to be discussed, and remembering My existence within all living entities as the Paramatman — these principles should be followed by all members of society through regulation of the mind, words and body.

In Śrīmad Bhāgavatam 11.19.36–39, cleanliness is also defined as detachment from activities prompted by desire. Cleanliness, therefore, means to give up material attachment, not merely to frequently rinse one's skin with water.

Hindus must bathe before entering temples in order to seek blessings, and temples often have tanks of water for this purpose. They also wash their feet before entering the temple. In some Orthodox Hindu households, taking a bath after visiting a funeral (antyeṣṭi) is required by Hindus who believe that a funeral is an inauspicious thing to witness, the inauspiciousness of which will follow those who do not purify themselves.

Hindus must visit the seven sacred rivers. Bathing in these rivers purifies the mind and increases their good merits. To invoke the presence of the holy rivers, the following mantra is chanted before the daily bath:

"AUM gaṇge ca yamune caiva godāvarī sarasvatī / narmade siṇdhu kāverī jalesmin saṃnidhim kuru."
[In this water, I invoke the presence of holy waters from the rivers Ganga, Yamuna, Godavari, Sarasvati, Narmada, Sindhu and Kaveri.]

Hindus clean their homes particularly well in preparing to celebrate Diwali each year as they believe that this brings good luck. Most Hindus also believe that keeping your house clean and great devotion are gestures to welcome the Goddess Lakshmi to their abode to stay. Some orthodox Hindus refrain from cleaning their houses on a Friday as it is a day dedicated to Goddess Lakshmi and cleaning homes on that day is considered inauspicious, so they clean their homes on other days. Tamil people also keep their homes clean in preparation for Diwali, Pongal, or Bhol.

=== In Islam ===
Islam stresses the importance of cleanliness and personal hygiene. There are many verses in the Quran that discuss cleanliness. For example, "…Truly, Allah loves those who turn to Him constantly and He 'loves those who keep themselves pure and clean" (2:222). And, "…In mosque, there are men who love to be clean and pure. Allah loves those who make themselves clean and pure" (9:108).

The first lessons in Islamic catechisms are often matters of cleanliness, with subjects including: what is clean and what is not clean, what people need to be cleansed from, how they should clean, and what should they use to clean with. Muslims are required to perform ablution (wudu) with clean water before every prayer, and are recommended to stay in the state of ablution at all times. Abolution with dry materials (tayammum) may be used in exceptional circumstances, such as if clean water is unavailable. A ritual bath (ghusl) is performed on Fridays before the Friday Prayer (Juma). Ritual baths are recommended for spiritual purity, also after committing a sin, and are necessary for those who have watched a funeral. Special attention is given to cleaning homes before the arrival of guests or before feasts (Eid al-Fitr and Eid al-Adha), and holy days and nights.

Islamic hygienical jurisprudence, which dates to the 7th century, has elaborate rules. Taharah (ritual purity) involves performing wudu (ablution) for salah (five daily prayers), as well as regularly performing ghusl (bathing), which led to bathhouses being built across the Islamic world. Islamic toilet hygiene also requires washing with water after using the toilet, for purity and to minimize germs.

A basic form of the contagion/germ theory of disease found in the medieval Islamic world, was proposed by Persian physician Ibn Sina (also known as Avicenna) in The Canon of Medicine (1025). He mentioned that people can transmit disease to others by breath, noted contagion with tuberculosis, and discussed the transmission of disease through water and dirt. The concept of invisible contagion was eventually widely accepted by Islamic scholars. In the Ayyubid Sultanate, they referred to such contagious substances as najasat ("impure substances"). The fiqh scholar Ibn al-Haj al-Abdari (c. 1250–133), while discussing Islamic diet and hygiene, gave advice and warnings about how contagion can contaminate water, food, and garments, and could spread through the water supply.

== See also ==
- Antiseptic – Antimicrobial substance or compound
- Aseptic technique – Absence of disease-causing microorganisms
- Cleaner – Person who cleans
- Cleaning – Activity that removes dirt and other particles from people, animals and objects
- Clean room – Dust-free room for research or production
- Contamination control – Activities aiming to reduce contamination
- Environmental remediation – Removal of pollution from soil, groundwater, etc
- Green cleaning – Type of cleaning methods and products
- Hygiene – Practices performed to preserve health
- Lady Macbeth effect – Psychological phenomenon
- Pollution – Adverse environmental contamination
- Ritual purification – Bathing or washing as a religious ritual
- Waste management – Activities and actions required to manage waste from its source to its final disposal
