= Carbon dioxide snow =

Carbon dioxide snow may refer to:

- Dry ice, a solid form of carbon dioxide
- Carbon dioxide cleaning, an industrial cleaning method
