= Jewellery cleaning =

Practice of cleaning jewelry

Jewelry cleaning is the practice of removing dirt or tarnish from jewelry to improve its appearance.

== Methods and risks ==
Some kinds of jewelry can be cleaned at home while others are suggested to be done by a professional. Jewelry made from gold and sterling silver are examples of jewelry that can be cleaned at home, while platinum should not be due to how at-risk platinum is of scratching. Jewelry with gemstones such as diamonds or sapphires can be cleaned at home as well using mild soap and warm water. However, gemstones such as opals and pearls should be done professionally. Another issue is the age of jewelry, as certain materials or build strategies of older jewelry (such as from the Georgian era) may have restrictions, such as not being able to get wet without damage. Keeping jewelry clean gives the gemstone(s) a good shiny appearance by removing dirt and grease from loosening them. Dirty jewelry may also cause skin irritation.

A professional cleaning may take anywhere from a few minutes to a few days depending on the circumstances. The cleaner would first inspect the jewelry to ensure that the gemstones are accounted for and secured. Materials that can handle it are often placed in an ultrasonic bath using a cleaning solution and later put through a steam cleaner, while more sensitive materials will go through light brushing in soapy water. Following this, they are rinsed, dried, and inspected. A jeweler may provide their customers with sudsy ammonia cleaning kits, while another may sell small ultrasonic cleaners. Some gemstones, such as white topaz, have an overlay to produce certain colors. Ultrasonic cleaning can remove this coating.

== Ultrasonic jewellery cleaning ==
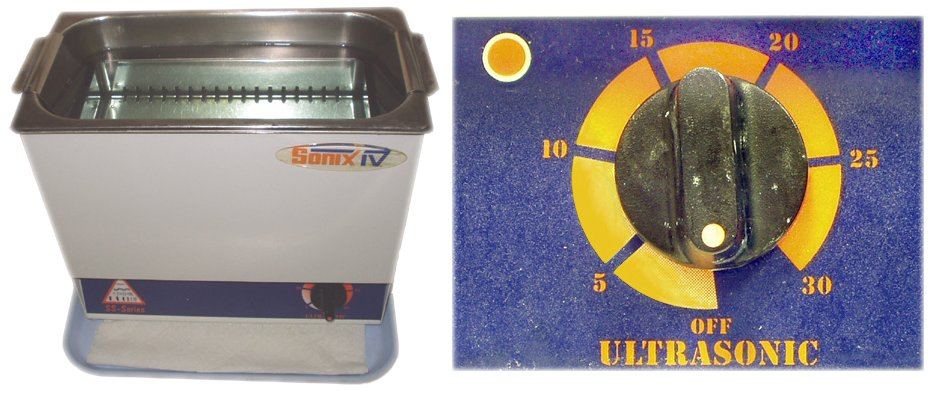
Ultrasonic cleaner showing the removable basket in place, and a closeup of the light and timer

Ultrasonic cleaners are useful for jewelry cleaning and removing tarnish. They use ultrasound waves and chemicals combined to create bubbles that "cling" to the foreign particles such as dirt, oil, and unknown substances. The high-frequency waves are sent out and pull the contaminants off the object. The bubbles collapse after they attach to the contaminants and move to the surface of the chemical solution creating what appears to be a boiling solution.

== Cleanliness of gems ==
Colored dye or smudges can affect the perceived color of a gem. Historically, some jewelers' diamonds were mis-graded due to smudges on the girdle, or dye on the culet. Current practice is to thoroughly clean a gem before grading its color as well as clarity.

How a gem can be safely cleaned depends upon its individual characteristics and therefore its susceptibility to damage.

== See also ==
- Art jewelry
- Jewellery
