= Solvent degreasing =

Industrial process

Fat-skimming spoon—also known as a "fat-and-lean" spoon—late 19th century. The long handle acts as a spring, depressing the small vertical rod and opening an outlet for the liquid to flow through, while the fat remains in the bowl of the spoon.

Solvent degreasing is a process used to prepare a part for further operations such as electroplating or painting. Typically it uses petroleum, chlorine, dry ice or alcohol based solvents to dissolve the machining fluids and other contaminants that might be on the part.

== Process ==
To begin with, a cleaning agent is applied directly to the surface by spraying, brushing, blasting or wiping. This process removes oil, grease, dirt, loose particles, and any other contaminants that may exist on the surface of the material.

Characteristics include: cleans almost all electronic assemblies, electrical components, and almost all metals. Parts are usually dried at an elevated temperature, however usually not below room temperature. However if you're cleaning by dry ice blasting objects are left dry and clean. Almost any size or shape of a part can be cleaned.

=== Spraying ===
The most common cold solvent operation, this is usually used in small maintenance degreasers using a petroleum or mineral solvent. Usually to remove the bulk of the material, and prepare it for the cleaning tank. Although if the part does not need to be perfectly clean, then the operation can be ended after spraying. Spraying can also be used as a prequel other degreasing operations such as vapor degreasing which gives a better clean.

=== Immersion ===
The part is immersed in a tank of solvent and usually agitated like a washing machine for clothes to get all of the contaminant off. It is then hung on a rack over the tank to allow drying. This is not to be confused with pickling, during which the part would be soaked in the bath for an extended period of time. This operation covers a relatively short period and doesn't clean as deeply as pickling.

Soaking is typically the most common application of this process. The material is left to soak until all the dirt or contaminates are removed from the surface. However, the work piece may also be sprayed or have solvent directly wiped on it. These two applications are typically used for spot cleaning

Due to the ability of the solvent to reach in all places, virtually all parts of any shape or size can be cleaned using solvent degreasing. The only restriction lies in the size of equipment available. Solvent degreasing equipment is available in a wide variety of sizes and shapes and mainly consists of a submersion tank. However, some degreasing equipment has a circulation and filtering system or some sort of elevation mechanism.

== Design considerations ==
=== Benefits ===
- The emissions are reduced when compared with vapor degreasing operations.
- Not as much venting is required, so it is easier to quickly set up a small degreasing operation.
- Liquid solvents are safer to deal with than vapor degreasing agents.

=== Challenges ===
- There is a high danger of fire when using petroleum and mineral solvents.
- The emissions from this type of operation, although less than those of other operations, are still considerable, and solvent degreasing has an environmental impact.
- Solvents are difficult to dispose of, and there are many government regulations on them.

== See also ==
- Parts cleaning
