= Ultrasonic cleaning =

Method of cleaning using ultrasound

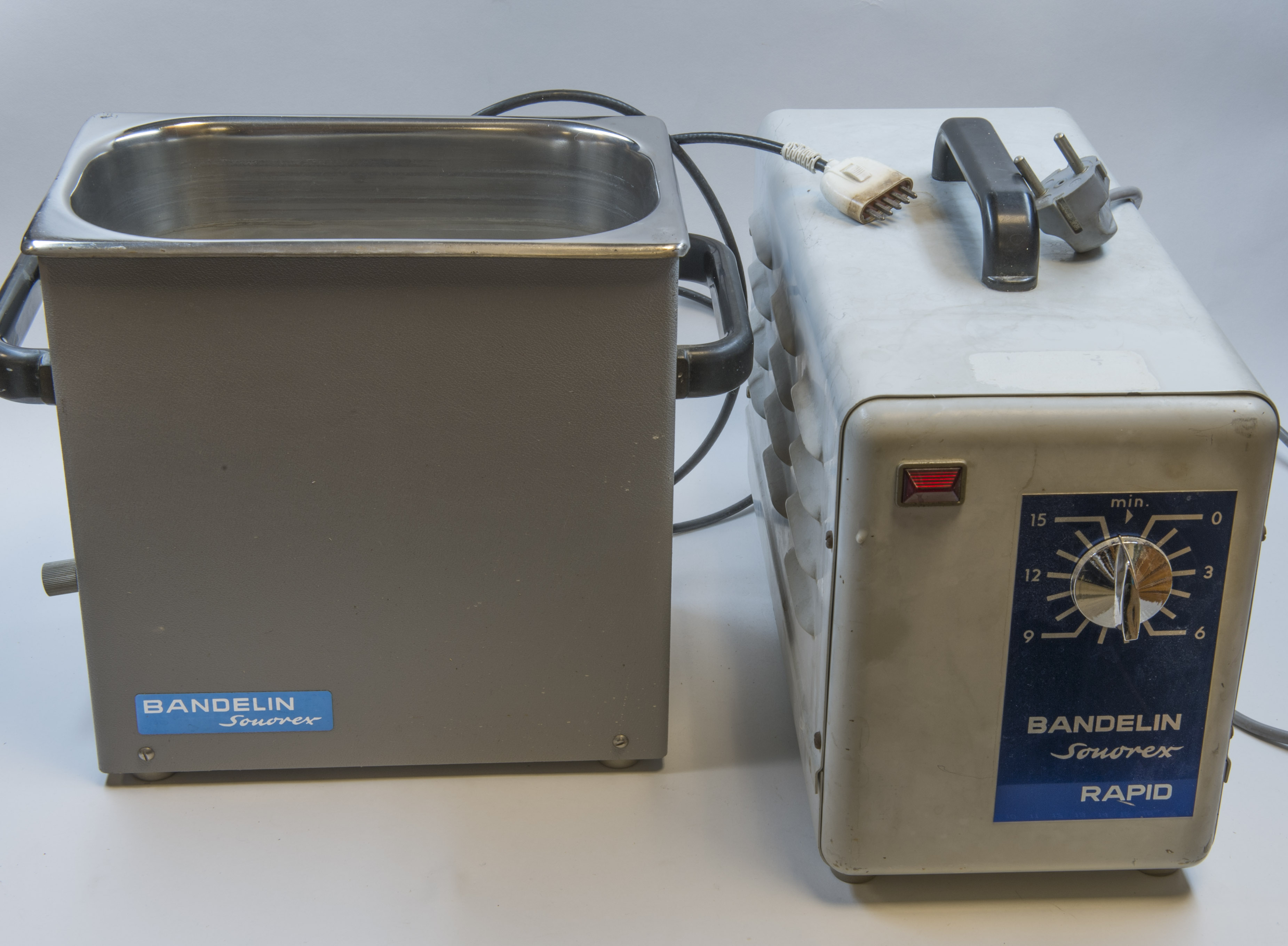
Sonorex ultrasonic cleaner from the 1970s or 1980s

Ultrasonic cleaning of a mobile phone

Ultrasonic cleaning is a process that uses ultrasound (usually from 20 – 40 kHz) to agitate a fluid, with a cleaning effect. Ultrasonic cleaners come in a variety of sizes, from small desktop units with an internal volume of less than 0.5 litres (0.13 US gal), to large industrial units with volumes approaching 1,000 litres (260 US gal).

The principle of the ultrasonic cleaning machine is to convert the sound energy of the ultrasonic frequency source into mechanical vibration through the transducer. The vibration generated by the ultrasonic wave is transmitted to the cleaning liquid through the cleaning tank wall so that the micro-bubbles in the liquid in the tank can keep vibrating under the action of the sound wave, destroying and separating the dirty adsorption on the surface of the object.

Depending on the object being cleaned, the process can be very rapid, completely cleaning a soiled item in minutes. In other instances, cleaning can be slower, and exceed 30 minutes.

Ultrasonic cleaners are used to clean many different types of objects, including industrial parts, jewelry, scientific samples, lenses and other optical parts, watches, dental and surgical instruments, tools, coins, fountain pens, golf clubs, fishing reels, window blinds, firearm components, car fuel injectors, musical instruments, gramophone records, industrial machined parts, and electronic equipment, etc. They are used in many jewelry workshops, watchmakers' establishments, electronic repair workshops, and scientific labs.

== History ==
Ultrasonic cleaning has been used industrially for decades, particularly to clean complex shape parts and/ or having small intricate holes/galleries, and to accelerate surface treatment processes.

It appears that ultrasonic cleaners developed as a natural evolution of several earlier inventions that used vibrations to agitate and mix substances, and thus there is no clear "inventor" of ultrasonic cleaning. US patent 2815193, issued December 1954, is the earliest patent on record that specifically uses the term "Ultrasonic cleaning" although earlier patents refer to the use of ultrasound for "intense agitation", "treatment", and "polishing", e.g. US 2651148.

By the mid-1950s there were at least three ultrasonic cleaner manufacturers established in the United States and two in the United Kingdom; and by the 1970s ultrasonic cleaners were widely established for industrial and domestic use.

== Process characteristics ==
Ultrasonic cleaning uses cavitation bubbles induced by high-frequency pressure (sound) waves to agitate a liquid. The agitation produces high forces on contaminants adhering to substrates like metals, plastics, glass, rubber, and ceramics. This action also penetrates blind holes, cracks, and recesses. The intention is to thoroughly remove all traces of contamination tightly adhering or embedded onto solid surfaces. Water or other solvents can be used, depending on the type of contamination and the workpiece. Contaminants can include dust, dirt, oil, pigments, rust, grease, algae, fungus, bacteria, lime scale, polishing compounds, flux agents, fingerprints, soot wax and mold release agents, biological soil like blood, and so on. Ultrasonic cleaning can be used for a wide range of workpiece shapes, sizes, and materials, and may not require the part to be disassembled prior to cleaning.

Objects must not be allowed to rest on the bottom of the device during the cleaning process, because that will prevent cavitation from taking place on the part of the object not in contact with solvent.

== Design and operating principle ==
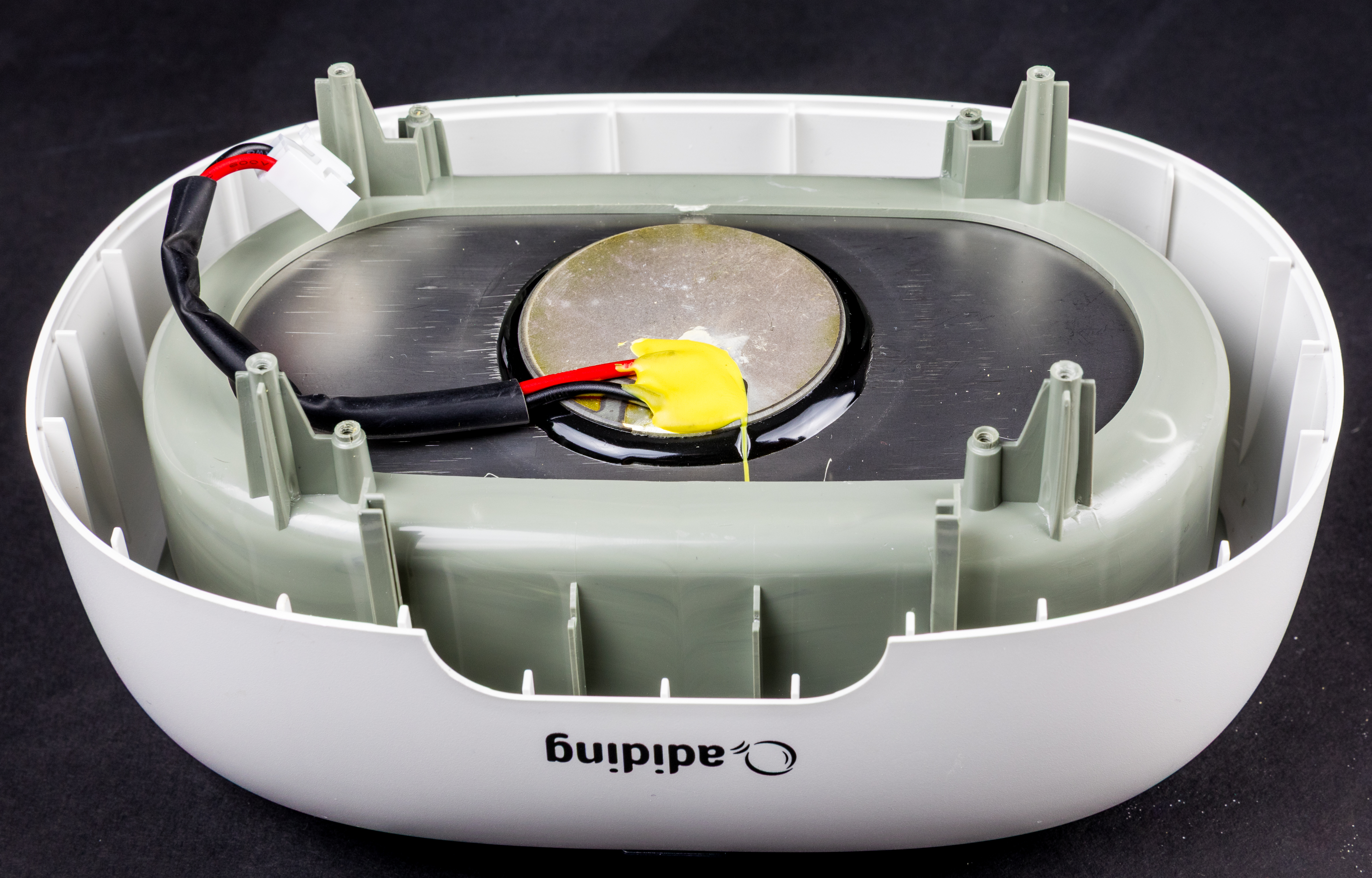
Transducer at the bottom of an ultrasonic cleaner

In an ultrasonic cleaner, the object to be cleaned is placed in a chamber containing a suitable solution (in an aqueous or organic solvent, depending on the application). In aqueous cleaners, surfactants (e.g., laundry detergent) are often added to permit dissolution of non-polar compounds such as oils and greases. An ultrasound generating transducer built into the chamber, or lowered into the fluid, produces ultrasonic waves in the fluid by changing size in concert with an electrical signal oscillating at ultrasonic frequency. This creates compression waves in the liquid of the tank which 'tear' the liquid apart, leaving behind many millions of microscopic 'voids'/'partial vacuum bubbles' (cavitation). These bubbles collapse with enormous energy; temperatures and pressures on the order of 5,000 K and 135 MPa are achieved; however, they are so small that they do no more than clean and remove surface dirt and contaminants. The higher the frequency, the smaller the nodes between the cavitation points, which allows for cleaning of more intricate detail.

Ultrasonic transducers showing ~20 kHz and ~40 kHz stacks. The active elements (near the top) are two rings of lead zirconate titanate, which are bolted to an aluminium coupling horn.

Transducers are usually piezoelectric (e.g. made with lead zirconate titanate (PZT), barium titanate, etc.), but are sometimes magnetostrictive. The often harsh chemicals used as cleaners in many industries are not needed, or used in much lower concentrations, with ultrasonic agitation. Ultrasonics are used for industrial cleaning and are also used in many medical and dental techniques and industrial processes.

== Cleaning solution ==
In some circumstances, ultrasonic cleaners can be used with plain water, but in most cases, a cleaning solution is used. This solution is designed to maximise the effectiveness of ultrasonic cleaning. The primary solvent may be water or a hydrocarbon (historically, toxic solvents such as carbon tetrachloride and 1,1,1-Trichloroethane were used industrially, but have been phased out). There are several formulations, dependent on the item being cleaned and the type of contamination (e.g., degreasing of metal, cleaning of printed circuit boards, removing biological material, and so on).

Reduction of surface tension increases cavitation, so the solution usually contains a good wetting agent (surfactant). Aqueous cleaning solutions contain detergents, wetting agents and other components, which have a large influence on the cleaning process. The correct composition of the solution is very dependent upon the item cleaned. When working with metals, proteins, and greases, an alkaline detergent solution may be specifically recommended. Solutions are typically heated, often around 50–65 °C (122–149 °F), however, in medical applications, it is generally accepted that cleaning should be at temperatures below 45 °C (113 °F) to prevent protein coagulation that can complicate cleaning.

Some ultrasonic cleaners are integrated with vapour degreasing machines using hydrocarbon cleaning fluids: Three tanks are used in a cascade. The lower tank containing dirty fluid is heated causing the fluid to evaporate. At the top of the machine there is a refrigeration coil. Fluid condenses on the coil and descends into the upper tank. The upper tank eventually overflows and relatively clean fluid runs into the work tank where the cleaning takes place. The purchase price is higher than simpler machines, but such machines may be more economical in the long run. The same fluid can be reused many times, minimising wastage and pollution.

== Uses ==
Most hard, non-absorbent materials (metals, plastics, etc.) not chemically attacked by the cleaning fluid are suitable for ultrasonic cleaning. Ideal materials for ultrasonic cleaning include small electronic parts, cables, rods, wires, and detailed items, as well as objects made of glass, plastic, aluminium, or ceramic.

Ultrasonic cleaning does not sterilize the objects being cleaned, because spores and viruses will remain on the objects after cleaning. In medical applications, sterilization normally follows ultrasonic cleaning as a separate step.

Industrial ultrasonic cleaners are used in the automotive, sporting, printing, marine, medical, pharmaceutical, electroplating, disk drive components, engineering, sterile processing, and weapons industries.

Ultrasonic cleaning is used to remove contamination from industrial process equipment such as pipes and heat exchangers.

Ultrasonic cleaning is widely utilised in domestic and professional settings for the maintenance of delicate personal items. Optical manufacturers recommend it as the most effective and gentle method for cleaning spectacles, as the process safely removes grease and debris from lenses and complex frame mechanisms without mechanical abrasion. Furthermore, the technology is routinely employed to restore the brilliance of durable jewellery and to effectively clean intricate tableware, employing cavitation to lift contaminants from metal surfaces.

== Limitations ==
Ultrasonic cleaning is used widely to remove flux residue from soldered circuit boards. However, some electronic components, notably MEMS devices such as gyroscopes, accelerometers and microphones can become damaged or destroyed by the high-intensity vibrations they are subjected to during cleaning. Piezoelectric buzzers can work in reverse and produce voltage, which may pose a danger to their drive circuits.

== Safety ==
- Ultrasonic cleaners can produce irritating, high-frequency noise and hearing protection may be needed in case of continuous exposure.
- It is recommended to avoid using flammable cleaning solutions because ultrasonic cleaners increase the temperature even when not equipped with a heater. (Some industrial units are specifically certified as explosion proof.)
- When the unit is running, contact with the cleaning solution could cause thermal or chemical injury; the ultrasonic action is relatively benign to living tissue but can cause discomfort and skin irritation.
- Ultrasonic cleaners are electrically powered, meaning there is a risk of electric shock in case of malfunction, especially if the cleaning solution comes into contact with electrified components.

== See also ==
- Parts cleaning
- Acoustic cleaning
- Washing machine
- Autoclave
- Macrosonics
- Sonication
- Tumble finishing
- Vibratory finishing
