= Macrosonics =

Macrosonics is the use of high amplitude sound waves for industrial applications. Applications include gas compression, cleaning of surfaces, plastic and metal welding, metal forming, machining, and chemical processing.

== See also ==
- Megasonic cleaning
