= Monobasic =

Monobasic may refer to:

- A monobasic or monoprotic acid, able to donate one proton per molecule
- A monobasic salt, with one hydrogen atom, with respect to the parent acid, replaced by cations
- Monobasic, or Monotypic taxon, a taxonomic group (taxon) that contains only one immediately subordinate taxon
- Monobasic, an album by Jess Cornelius
- Mono-Basic, the implementation of Visual Basic.Net for Mono

== See also ==
- Dibasic (disambiguation)
- Tribasic (disambiguation)
- Polybasic (disambiguation)
