= Polybasic =

Polybasic may refer to:

- A polybasic or polyprotic acid, able to donate more than one proton per molecule
- A polybasic salt, with more than one hydrogen atom, with respect to the parent acid, replaced by cations

== See also ==
- Monobasic (disambiguation)
- Dibasic (disambiguation)
- Tribasic (disambiguation)
