= Dibasic =

Dibasic may refer to:

- Dibasic, or diprotic acid, an acid containing two potential protons to donate
- Dibasic salt, a salt with two hydrogen atoms, with respect to the parent acid, replaced by cations
- Dibasic ester, an ester of a dicarboxylic acid

== See also ==
- Monobasic (disambiguation)
- Tribasic (disambiguation)
- Polybasic (disambiguation)
