= Tribasic =

Tribasic may refer to:

- A tribasic, or triprotic acid, containing three potential protons to donate
- A tribasic salt, with three hydrogen atoms, with respect to the parent acid, replaced by cations

== See also ==
- Monobasic (disambiguation)
- Dibasic (disambiguation)
- Polybasic (disambiguation)
