= Megasonic cleaning =

Megasonic cleaning is a specialized cleaning method that utilizes high-frequency sound waves to remove contaminants from delicate surfaces. It is particularly effective in industries like semiconductor manufacturing, optics, and medical device production, where precision and gentle cleaning are crucial. It is a type of acoustic cleaning related to ultrasonic cleaning. Similar to ultrasonic cleaning, megasonic cleaning uses a transducer that sits on top of a piezoelectric substrate. The transducer creates acoustic waves at a higher frequency (typically 0.8–2 MHz) than ultrasonic cleaning (20-200 kHz). As a result, the cavitation that occurs is reduced and on a much smaller scale.

== Comparison to ultrasonic cleaning ==
Megasonic cleaning differs from ultrasonic cleaning in the frequency that is used to generate the acoustic waves. Ultrasonic cleaning uses lower frequencies and its mechanism relies on cavitation, while megasonic cleaning uses higher frequencies and produces less damaging cavitation.

In ultrasonic devices, cavitation occurs throughout the tank, and all sides of submerged parts are cleaned. In megasonic devices, the acoustic wave is found only in a line of sight from the transducer surface. For this reason, megasonic transducers are typically built using arrays of closely spaced square or rectangular piezoelectric devices that are bonded to a substrate. Semiconductor wafers are typically cleaned in carriers holding the substrates perpendicular to the transducer, allowing both the front and back surfaces to be cleaned. Special carriers are sometimes used to reduce any obstructions that may prevent parts of the wafer surface from being cleaned.

Megasonic cleaners come in many configurations, such as single or dual nozzle systems, or single-wafer transducers. In single-wafer devices, the wafer rotates on a spinning tool, and the megasonic waves are applied from above.

== See also ==
- Parts cleaning
- Ultrasonic cavitation device
