= Parts washer =

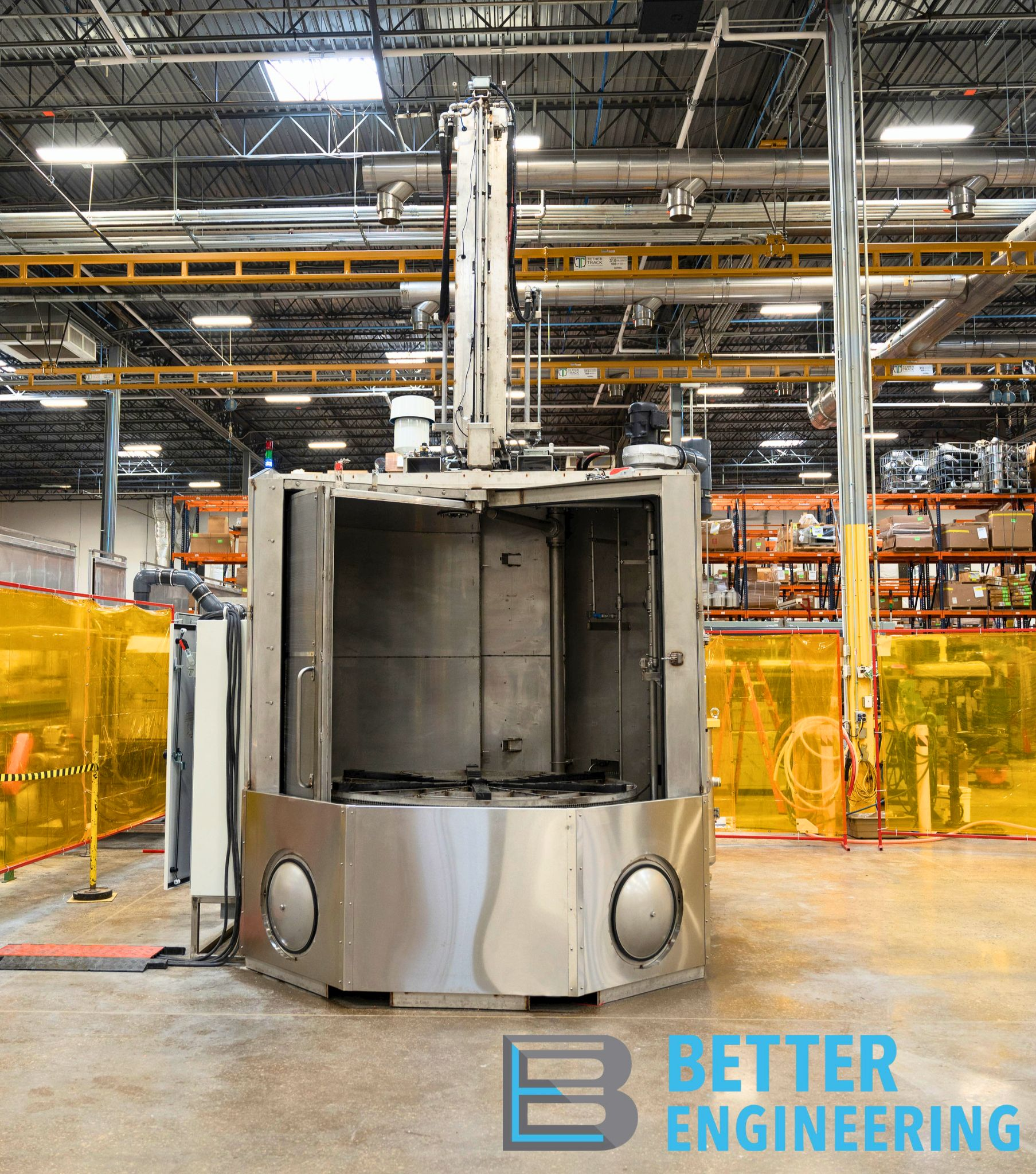
Front-loading heavy-duty turntable parts washer, with various washing capabilities

A parts washer is a piece of equipment used to remove contaminants or debris, such as dirt, grime, carbon, oil, grease, metal chips, cutting fluids, mold release agents, ink, paint, and corrosion from workpieces. Parts washers are used in new manufacturing and remanufacturing processes; they are designed to clean, degrease and dry bulk loads of small or large parts in preparation for assembly, inspection, surface treatment, packaging and distribution. Parts washers may be as simple as the manual "sink-on-a-drum" common to many auto repair shops, or they may be very complex, multi-stage units with pass-through parts handling systems. Parts washers are essential in maintenance, repair and remanufacturing operations as well, from cleaning fasteners, nuts, bolts and screws to diesel engine blocks and related parts, rail bearings, wind turbine gears boxes and automotive assemblies.

A parts washer is distinctly different from a pressure washer in that parts washers typically clean parts automatically in an enclosed cabinet, while pressure washers typically have a single spray jet mounted at the end of a manually operated wand. Modern industrial technology makes it possible to combine many parts of the finishing process into one. As an integrated part of the manufacturing process, automatic parts washers are able to load, wash, rinse, dry and unload parts in an automatic cycle.

In industry, chemical solvents were typically used to remove oils, grease and dirt during the cleaning process, but recent environmental concerns and regulations have encouraged the innovation of water based detergents for parts cleaning. Today, most parts washers use a variety of alkaline based detergents as the cleaning chemical.

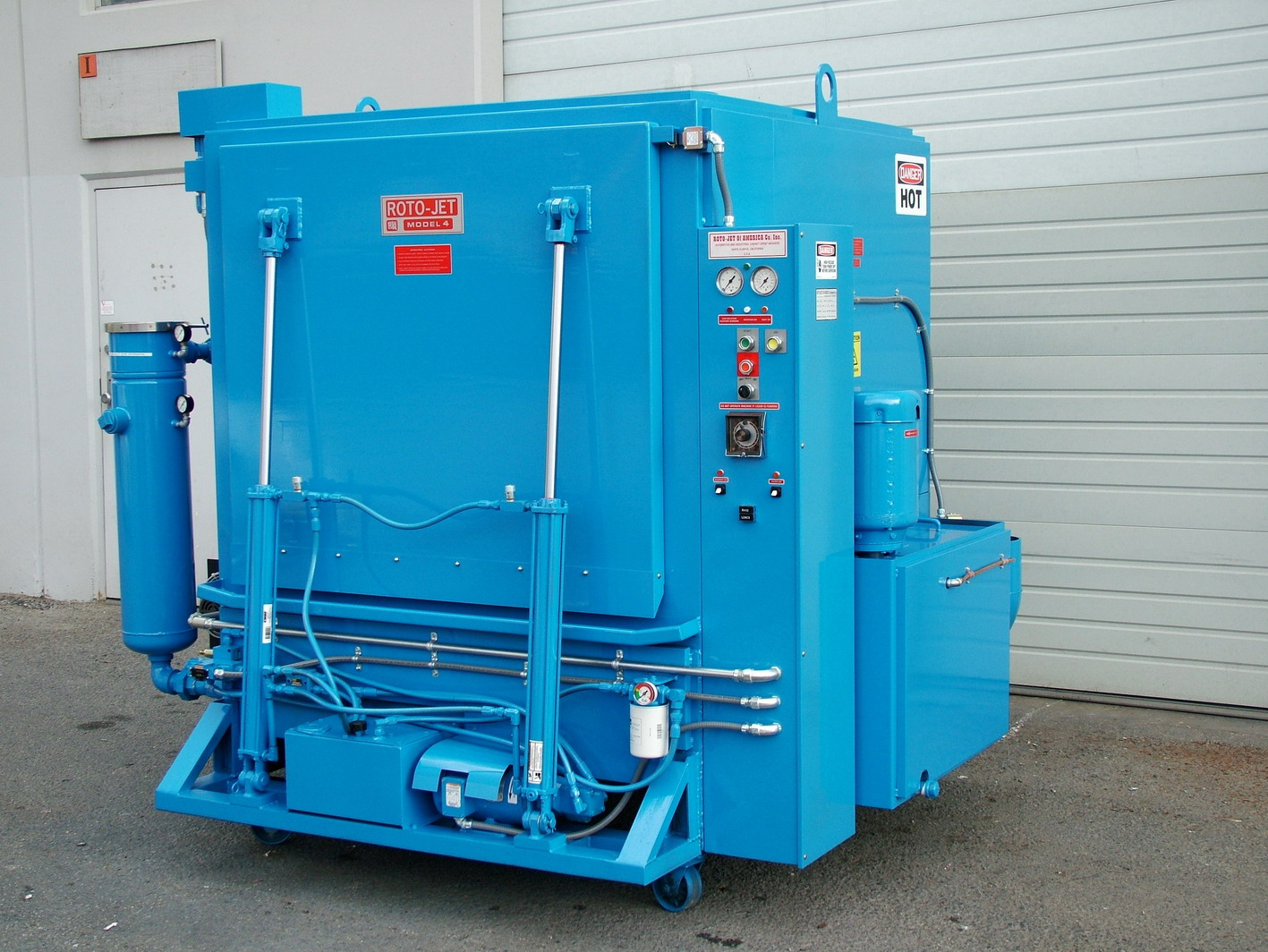
Industrial and automotive parts washer with hydraulically operated door and pull-out parts basket/parts carriage

== History ==
Parts washers were originally developed for use in automotive transmission and engine repair shops as a way to improve the function of simple soak tanks. Soak tanks are vats filled with a mixture of water and detergent, which take hours to "soften" the built-up road grime, fluids, tars and oils enough to be manually rinsed off prior to disassembly and repair.

Since the late 60's many methods of parts cleaning have been developed with improved levels of safety and lessened environmental impact. Stoddard solvent, gasoline, diesel fuel, and kerosene were commonly used to clean and degrease parts. Then, chlorinated solvents in vapor degreasers became an industry standard. During the 1980s environmental and safety issues led to the banning of chlorinated solvents for parts cleaning. Aqueous-based cleaning systems took on new prominence that led to many improvements, in the systems and the processes. In 1971, Gary Minkin developed an aqueous based parts washer for degreasing automobile parts. The Minkin breakthrough used the force of hydraulic impact pressure to significantly improve the cleaning power of the aqueous parts washer.

== Cleaning methods ==
Beside high mechanical energy, higher cleaning temperatures are one of the most effective methods of improving the cleaning results in a parts washer. In general, a 10 to 15 °F (5.6 to 8.3 °C) rise doubles the chemical reaction of the detergent. The increased chemical reaction between the greases and oils and the detergent delivers faster cleaning cycles and cleaner parts. Additionally, all greases and oils exhibit a lower viscosity at higher temperatures. Cleaning solution temperatures of 170 °F (77 °C) and above softens or melts most oils and greases causing them to flow like water so they are easily removed resulting in faster cleaning, better results and cleaner parts. Many parts washers are not capable of maintaining this operating temperature due to the lack of amply heating systems. Additionally, careful design is required of the pumping system so it can pull in and deliver cleaning solution at temperatures that approach boiling in the parts washer. All centrifugal pumps require a net positive suction head (NPSHr) in order to be able to pump solution. As the temperature of the solution approaches the NPSHr, the pump stops pumping because the cleaning solution flashes to steam in the pump intake. Careful design of the pump is required to minimize NPSHr and allow pumping of high temperature cleaning solution.

A typical parts washer is aqueous based but there are some types that use solvent.

=== Solvent-based ===
Ben Palmer invented a solvent style parts washer in 1954. The parts washer was a success from the start, and he decided in the early 1960s not to sell his machine, but to lease it to the customer and service it by removing and replenishing the used solvent. Since the early 1990s there has been a significant shift towards aqueous based systems due to the environmental and safety hazards associated with solvent systems.

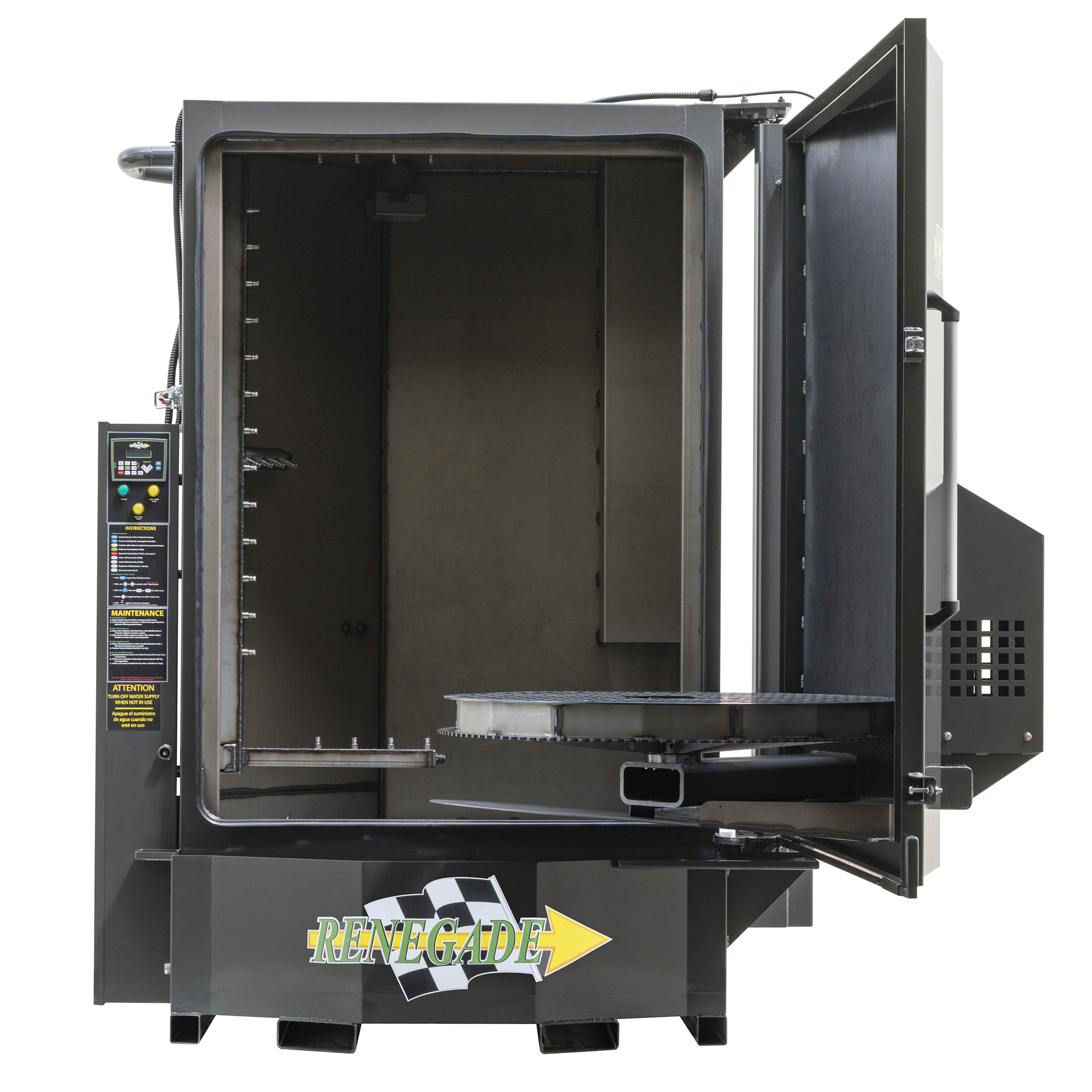
Industrial front load parts washer with door mounted "swing-out" turntable

A solvent style parts washer is filled with several gallons of solvent that is stored in a settling pan at the bottom of the washer. A small flame-tight electric liquid pump is immersed in the solvent and skims clean solvent from near the top of the settling tank, and pumps it at low pressure through a stiff flexible nozzle onto a metal grating above the liquid where the metal components rest. Dirt and dissolved heavy greases fall into the bottom and settle to the bottom of the tank.

Originally, mixtures of oil distillates such as gasoline, diesel fuel, lacquer thinner or kerosene were used in solvent-based manually operated parts washers, but these are highly volatile and can ignite easily, potentially leading to an explosion and severe burns to the workers. For this reason, the solvent-based "tub" washer typically has a large cover that is propped open by a lead fusible link. In the event of a fire, the lead will melt and the cover will slam shut to snuff out the fire before it can cause further damage to the building.

=== Aqueous-based ===
An aqueous-based parts washer is much like a large dish washer. It uses water and detergent combined with heat and mechanical energy to provide the cleaning action. There are two main process styles of aqueous parts washers, the jet spray process and the power wash process. In a cabinet parts washer, the parts are placed on a turntable and the door is closed. During the cleaning cycle heated solution is flooded or blasted on the parts as the turntable rotates. Many systems have a wash, rinse and dry cycle. When the cycle is complete the door is opened and the parts removed.

There are four primary factors that affect the cleaning results in an aqueous parts washer. These factors are mechanical energy, temperature, detergent and time. Adjusting any one of these factors in a cleaning cycle changes the cleaning results. A parts washer with large amounts of mechanical energy and a high temperature delivers shorter cleaning cycles and uses less cleaning detergent. Mechanical energy is provided by the pump drive system. Most aqueous parts washers use an electric motor to drive a centrifugal pump. The mechanical energy delivered to the wash load is what defines the mechanical energy for cleaning and not the horsepower of the pump. Efficient use of the pump motor energy through a well designed centrifugal pump and attention to details of piping design and nozzle types are critical to put the most mechanical energy into the cleaning process. Additionally, one must consider the work volume of the parts washer. In order to achieve similar results, from one size machine to another, the power density must be the same for a given work volume, This factor requires that substantially higher horsepower pumping systems be used as the work volume increases exponentially on larger diameter machines.

Aqueous-based parts washers use alkaline detergents mixed with water to clean parts. This solution is safer than solvent-based systems because the risk of the cleaning solution catching fire is eliminated. The detergent for an aqueous parts washer may be in the form of a powder or a liquid. Each form has its advantages and the particular parts cleaning application will determine the best form. In general, powder detergents are the more aggressive and typically used in maintenance and rebuilding operations while liquids are more commonly found in lighter cleaning applications that were once commonly the domain of vapor degreasers.

==== Jet spray vs. power wash processes ====
A jet spray washer cleans by flooding the parts with warm chemical solution and high chemical concentration to clean the parts. In the power wash process the parts are blasted with hot chemical solution utilizing the hydraulic impact force of the cleaning solution as the primary cleaning mechanism. A parts washer utilizing the power washer process operates at a very low concentration of cleaning detergent. The lower concentration causes the cleaning solution to last longer before it becomes supersaturated and requires disposal. Additionally, a low concentration of cleaning chemicals allows for easier rinsing of the detergent from the parts thereby minimizing rinse cycle requirements thus saving water and cycle time. A final factor used in the power wash process is an oscillating manifold system that is non-synchronous to the rotation of the turntable. This system assures that the blasted solution reaches all areas of the parts load that are otherwise blinded by the stationary manifolds used in the jet spray process. All things considered the power wash process is superior to the jet spray process for faster more thorough parts cleaning cycles while minimizing detergent use and waste generation. The power wash process is generally effective for difficult soil removal applications such as burnt hydrocarbons, paint, scale, varnish, carbon, mastic, or rubber. Additional power wash types of applications generally include cleaning diesel engines, aerospace components, aluminum automobile engine parts and rolling mill equipment.

There are some considerations when using the "power wash" process in that comparatively high horsepower, thus high-current motors requiring an adequate power source, are utilized with correspondingly high washing pressures that require the parts to be adequately secured to the turntable. The "jet spray" process is found to be adequate for cleaning applications that do not involve removal of difficult soils but in general the power wash process is the superior cleaning process.

== Power density ==
A parts washer's performance can be gauged by its power density, calculated as the total pump horsepower divided by the washer's work volume, typically measured in horsepower per cubic foot. This value helps compare systems and adjust for consistent cleaning in different volumes. However, power density assumes full pump efficiency, which varies with pump operation, piping, and friction losses. For a precise assessment, efficiency factors should be included, as even identical pumps can perform differently based on these design and operational elements.
