= Dry-ice blasting =

Cryogenic surface cleaning method

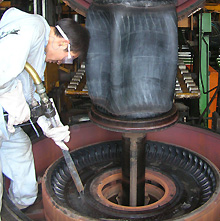
Dry-ice blasting used to clean a rubber mold

Dry-ice blasting is a form of carbon dioxide cleaning, where dry ice, the solid form of carbon dioxide, is accelerated in a pressurized air stream and directed at a surface in order to clean it.

The method is similar to other forms of media blasting such as sand blasting, plastic bead blasting, or sodablasting in that it cleans surfaces using a medium accelerated in a pressurized air stream, but dry-ice blasting uses dry ice as the blasting medium. Dry-ice blasting is nonabrasive, non-conductive, nonflammable, and non-toxic.

Dry-ice blasting is an efficient cleaning method. Dry ice is made of reclaimed carbon dioxide that is produced from other industrial processes, and is an approved media by the EPA, FDA and USDA. It also reduces or eliminates employee exposure to the use of chemical cleaning agents.

Compared to other media blasting methods, dry-ice blasting does not create secondary waste or chemical residues as dry ice sublimates, or converts back to a gaseous state, when it hits the surface that is being cleaned. Dry-ice blasting does not require clean-up of a blasting medium. The waste products, which includes just the dislodged media, can be swept up, vacuumed or washed away depending on the containment.

== Method ==
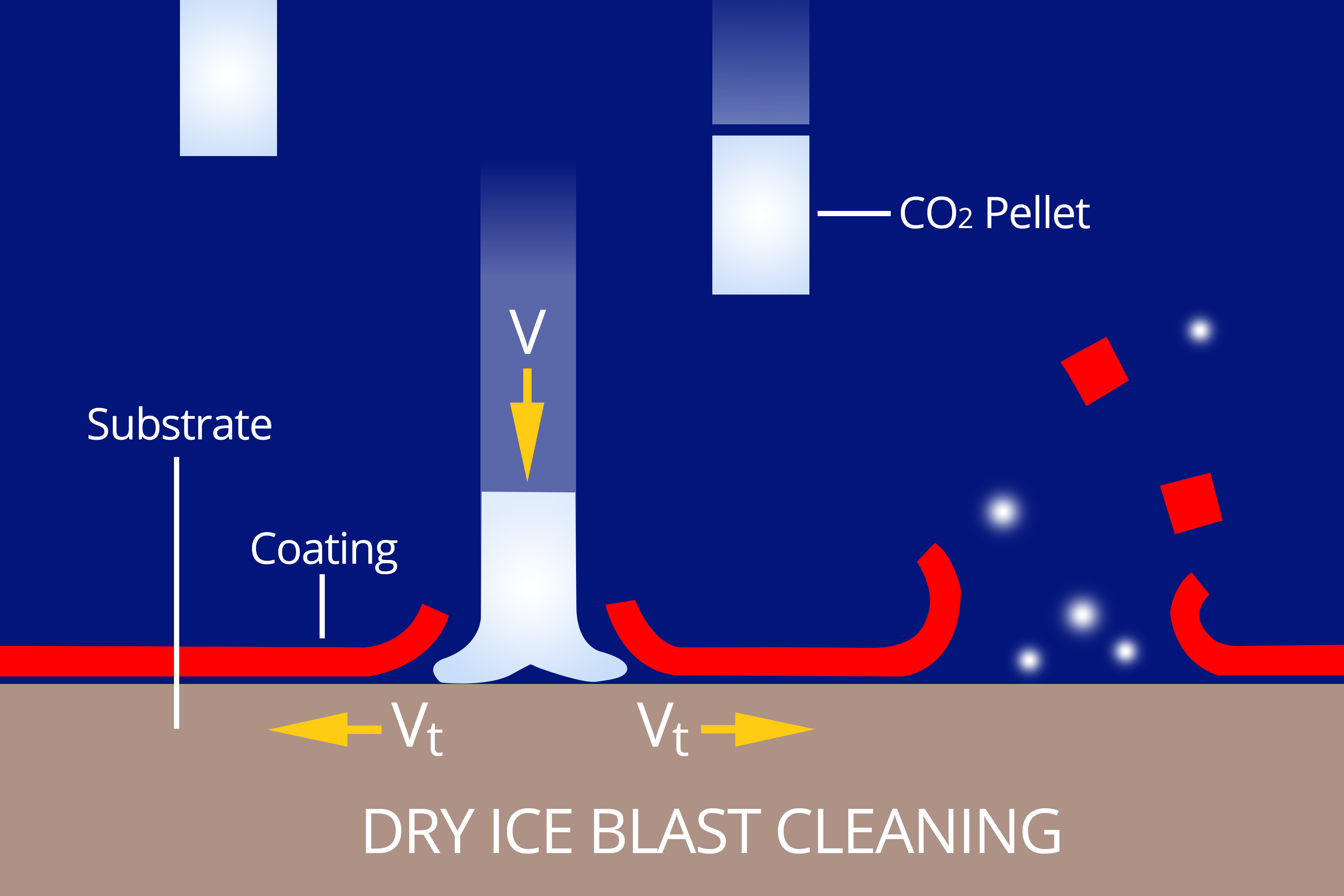
Dry-ice blasting illustration

Dry-ice blasting involves propelling pellets at extremely high speeds. The actual dry ice pellets are quite soft, and much less dense than other media used in blast-cleaning (i.e. sand or plastic pellets). Upon impact, the pellet sublimates almost immediately, transferring minimal kinetic energy to the surface on impact and producing minimal abrasion. The sublimation process absorbs a large volume of heat from the surface, producing shear stresses due to thermal shock. This is assumed to improve cleaning as the top layer of dirt or contaminant is expected to transfer more heat than the underlying substrate and flake off more easily. The efficiency and effectiveness of this process depends on the thermal conductivity of the substrate and contaminant. The rapid change in state from solid to gas also causes microscopic shock waves, which are also thought to assist in removing the contaminant.

== Equipment ==
The dry ice used can be in solid pellet form or shaved from a larger block of ice. The shaved ice block produces a less dense ice medium and is more delicate than the solid pellet system. In addition, pellets may be made by either compressing dry ice snow, or using tanks of liquid CO_{2} to form solid pellets. Dry ice made with compressed snow breaks apart more easily and is not as aggressive for cleaning.

Dry-ice blasting technology can trace its roots to conventional abrasive blasting. The differences between an abrasive-blasting machine and a dry-ice blasting machine are in how they handle the blast media. Unlike sand or other media, dry ice is generally used at its sublimation temperature. Other differences include systems for preventing the ice from forming snowball-like jams, and different materials to allow operation at very low temperatures.

There are two methods of dry-ice blasting, two-hose and single hose. The single hose system is more aggressive for cleaning, since the particles are accelerated to faster speeds.

Two-hose dry-ice blasting was developed before the single-hose system. The two-hose dry-ice blasting approach is very similar to a suction-feed abrasive blast system. Compressed air is delivered in one hose, and ice pellets are sucked out of a second hose by the venturi effect. Compared to a single-hose system, the two-hose system delivers ice particles less forcefully (approximately 5% for a given air supply). For a given amount of compressed air, two-hose systems can have less vertical distance between the machine and applicator. For most systems available today this limit is well in excess of 7.5 m (25 feet). Two-hose systems are generally cheaper to produce due to a simpler delivery system. These systems are rarely seen today as they are less efficient in most applications. Their principal advantage is in allowing finer particles of ice to be delivered to the applicator as the late combination of warm air with cold ice results in less sublimation in the hose. These systems allow for more delicate surfaces to be cleaned such as semiconductors.

The first dry-ice blasting machine to be commercialized was a single-hose system. It was developed by Cold Jet, LLC in 1986, and uses a single hose to deliver air blasts and dry ice. Single-hose dry-ice blasters share many of the advantages of single-hose abrasive-blast systems. To avoid the potential dangers of a pressurized hopper, single-hose dry-ice blasters make use of a quickly cycling airlock. The single-hose system can use a longer hose than its double-hose counterpart without a significant drop in pressure when the ice leaves the hose. The additional power comes at the cost of increased complexity. Single-hose systems are used where more aggressive cleaning is an advantage. This allows heavier build-up to be cleaned and allows moderate buildup to be cleaned faster.

In 2014, a Slovak company, ICS Ice Cleaning Systems, patented a set of crushing rollers to reduce the size of particles leaving the applicator gun. This allowed the operator for the first time to control the fractional size of each dry ice pellet. From the International standard 3mm to 1.5mm and smaller if desired. Simply by the push of an electronic button. Allowing for applications on more delicate surfaces without harming them.

Additionally, one could shoot these smaller fractions of dry ice pellets towards multiple surfaces with varying coatings, compositions, and textures, while mitigating risks of damaged surfaces. While attempted previously with nozzle fragmentation devices, these new crushing rollers provided accuracy and efficiency not previously achieved. In 2020, a Florida-based entrepreneur and founder of the DryceNation community, began sharing this method which was immediately well received by the collector car industry. Videos on social media platforms further accelerated this process which was widely accepted by 2022.

== Uses ==
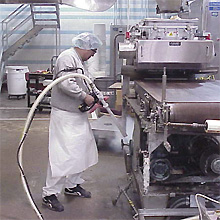
Dry-ice blasting used to clean bakery equipment

Dry-ice blasting is utilized in many different types of industries. The unique properties of dry ice make it an ideal cleaning solution in many commercial and manufacturing settings.

Dry-ice blasting can clean numerous objects with differing, complex geometries at once, which is why cleaning plastic and rubber molds is a main application for the technology. Dry ice replaces traditional cleaning methods that rely on manual scrubbing and the use of chemical cleaning agents. Dry-ice blasting cleans the molds in-place at operating temperature, which eliminates the need to shut production down for cleaning.

=== Food processing industry ===
Dry-ice blasting can be used to clean food processing equipment. As early as 2004, the UK Food Standards Agency documented the process to effectively decontaminate surfaces of Salmonella enteritidis, E. coli, and Listeria monocytogenes such that these microorganisms are not detectable using conventional microbiological methods. "As a result of two outbreaks salmonellosis associated with the consumption of peanut butter and baby food in 2006–2007, an effort was taken" by GMA members such as Cargill "to reassess industry practices for eliminating salmonella in low-moisture products" because "Salmonella outbreaks from low-moisture products are relatively rare but often impact large numbers of people." A document resulted from this effort describing a variety of waterless cleaning methods, including dry-ice blasting.

It may also be used to clean some equipment without disassembly and without producing fire or electrical hazards. The EPA recommends dry-ice blasting as an alternative to many types of solvent-based cleaning.

=== Disaster remediation ===
The cleaning process may be used for disaster remediation including mold, smoke, fire, and water damage.

=== Historic item preservation ===
Due to the nonabrasive nature of dry ice and the absence of secondary waste from the cleaning process, dry-ice blasting is used in conservation and historical preservation projects. The cleaning process was used in the conservation of the USS Monitor and the Philadelphia Museum of Art.

=== Semiconductor fabrication ===
Due to the blast media sublimating without residue, dry-ice blasting finds use in the semiconductor, aerospace, and medical device manufacturing industries.

=== Metalworking ===
The cleaning process is also used in other manufacturing settings, such as cleaning production equipment on automated weld lines, cleaning composite tooling, cleaning industrial printing presses, cleaning molds and equipment used in foundries, and to clean equipment and tooling in onshore and offshore environments in the oil and gas industry.

Dry-ice blasting is also used to deburr and deflash parts and in surface preparation prior to painting.

=== Car repair industry ===
Dry ice blasting technology has a wide range of applications in the field of car cleaning. Due to its environmentally friendly and efficient characteristics, it has gradually become an important means of car maintenance and cleaning. The following are the main uses of dry ice blasting in car cleaning:

Dry ice blasting can quickly remove oil, carbon deposits and dust from the engine surface without damaging wires, rubber parts and other sensitive parts. This non-contact cleaning method can ensure the normal operation of the engine and extend its service life.

Dry ice blasting is suitable for cleaning stubborn stains such as oil stains, food residues and smoke marks on car seats, carpets and door interiors. Since dry ice particles are directly vaporized, no water or chemical cleaning agents are required, and no additional drying steps are required after cleaning.

Car chassis are prone to accumulation of dirt, salt and oil, which may cause corrosion or mechanical failure. Dry ice blasting can effectively remove stubborn dirt on the chassis while protecting the metal surface and coating from damage.

== Safety ==
Carbon dioxide is increasingly toxic starting at concentrations above 1%, and can also displace oxygen resulting in asphyxia if equipment is not used in a ventilated area. In addition, because carbon dioxide is heavier than air, exhaust vents are required to be at or near ground level to efficiently remove the gas. At normal pressure dry ice is −78 °C (−108 °F) and must be handled with insulated gloves. Eye and ear protection are required to safely use dry-ice cleaning equipment.

== History ==
It is believed the US Navy, in 1945, were the first to experiment with dry-ice blasting. They were interested in using the technology for various degreasing applications.

In 1959, Unilever filed a patent for using dry-ice blasting (or water-ice blasting, or some combination of the two) as a method of removing meat from bone.

In 1971, Chemotronics International Inc. filed a patent for using dry-ice blasting for the purposes of deburring and deflashing.

A patent for dry-ice blasting was filed by Lockheed Martin in 1974.

The first patents regarding development and design of modern-day single-hose dry-ice blasting technology were awarded to David Moore of Cold Jet, LLC in 1986, 1988 (U.S. patent 4,617,064 and U.S. patent 4,744,181).

== See also ==
- Carbon dioxide cleaning
