= Dibasic ester =

Chemical compound

Dibasic ester or DBE is an ester of a dicarboxylic acid. Depending on the application, the alcohol may be methanol or higher molecular weight monoalcohols.

Mixtures of different methyl dibasic esters are commercially produced from short-chain acids such as adipic acid, glutaric acid, and succinic acid. They are non-flammable, readily biodegradable, non-corrosive, and have a mild, fruity odour.

Dibasic esters of phthalates, adipates, and azelates with C8 - C10 alcohols have found commercial use as lubricants, spin finishes, and additives.

== Applications ==
Dibasic esters are used in paints, coil coatings, paint strippers, coatings, plasticisers, resins, binders, solvents, polyols, soil stabilization, chemical grouting, oilfield drilling fluids, crop protection products, cedar spray, and adhesives.

== See also ==
- Dibasic (disambiguation)
