= Acoustic cleaning =

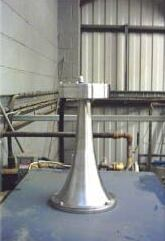
An acoustic cleaning horn on material handling equipment

Acoustic cleaning is a maintenance method used in material-handling and storage systems that handle bulk granular or particulate materials, such as grain elevators, to remove the buildup of material on surfaces. An acoustic cleaning apparatus, usually built into the material-handling equipment, works by generating powerful, audible sound waves which shake particulates loose from surfaces, reducing the need for manual cleaning. Higher frequency sound waves are used in ultrasonic and megasonic cleaning

== History and design ==
An acoustic cleaner consists of a sound source similar to an air horn found on trucks and trains, attached to the material-handling equipment, which directs a loud sound into the interior. It is powered by compressed air rather than electricity so there is no danger of sparking, which could set off an explosion. It consists of two parts:

- The acoustic driver, usually made from solid machined stainless steel. In the driver, compressed air escaping past a diaphragm causes it to vibrate, generating the sound. The diaphragm, the only moving part, is usually manufactured from special aerospace grade titanium to ensure performance and longevity.
- The bell, a flaring horn, usually made from spun 316 grade stainless steel. The bell serves as a sound resonator, and its flaring shape couples the sound efficiently to the air, increasing the volume of sound radiated.

The overall length of acoustic cleaner horns range from 430 mm to over 3 metres long. The device can operate from a pressure range of 4.8 to 6.2 bars or 70 to 90 psi. The resultant sound pressure level will be around 200 dB.

There are generally 4 ways to control the operation of an acoustic cleaner:

- The most common is by a simple timer
- Supervisory control and data acquisition (SCADA)
- Programmable logic controller (PLC)
- Manually by ball valve

An acoustic cleaner will typically sound for 10 seconds and then wait for a further 500 seconds before sounding again. The working life of the diaphragm is approximately proportional to the on/off ratio. Provided the operating environment is between −40 °C and 100 °C, a diaphragm should last between 3 and 5 years if on this much. The wave generator and the bell have a much longer life span and will often outlast the environment in which they operate.

The older bells which were made from cast iron were susceptible to rusting in certain environments. The new bells made from 316 spun steel have no problem with rust and are ideal for sterile environments such as found in the food industry or in pharmaceutical plants.

Acoustic cleaning began in the early 1970s with experiments using ship horns or air raid sirens. The first acoustic cleaners were made from cast iron. From 1990 onwards the technology became commercially viable and began to be used in dry processing, storage, transport, power generation and manufacturing industries. The latest technology uses 316 spun stainless steel to ensure optimum performance.

== Operation and performance ==
The majority of acoustic cleaners operate in the audio frequency range from 60 hertz up to 420 Hz. However a few operate in the infrasonic range, below 40 Hz, which is mostly below the human hearing range, to satisfy strict noise control requirements. There are three scientific fields which converge in the understanding of acoustic cleaning technology.

- Sound propagation. This relates to an understanding of the nature of the sound waves, how they vary and how they will interact with the environment.
- Mathematics of the environment. Materials science, surface friction, distance and areas familiar to a mechanical engineer.
- Chemical engineering. The chemical properties of the powder or substance to be debonded. Especially the auto adhesive properties of the powder.

An acoustic cleaner creates a series of very rapid and powerful sound induced pressure fluctuations, which are then transmitted into the solid particles of ash, dust, granules or powder. This causes them to move at differing speeds and debond from adjoining particles and the surface that they are adhering to. Once they have been separated then the material will fall off due to gravity or it will be carried away by the process gas or air stream.

The key features which determine whether or not an acoustic cleaner will be effective for any given problem are the particle size range, the moisture content and the density of the particles as well as how these characteristics will change with temperature and time. Typically particles between 20 micrometres and 5 mm with moisture content below 8.5% are ideal. Upper temperature limits are dependent upon the melting point of the particles and acoustic cleaners have been employed at temperatures above 1000 °C to remove ash build-up in boiler plants.

It is important to match the operating frequencies to the requirements. Higher frequencies can be directed more accurately whilst lower frequencies will carry further, and are generally used for more demanding requirements. A typical selection of frequencies available would be as follows:

- 420 Hz for a small acoustic cleaner which might be used to clear bridging at the base of a silo.
- 350 Hz will be more powerful and this frequency can be used to unblock material build-up in ID (induced draft) fans, filters, cyclones, mixers, dryers and coolers.
- 230 Hz. At this frequency, the power involved is sufficient to use in most electricity generation applications.
- 75 Hz and 60 Hz. These are generally the most powerful acoustic cleaners and are often used in large vessels and silos.

== Health and safety ==
The introduction of acoustic cleaners has been a significant improvement in many areas of health and safety. For instance in silo cleaning - the previous solutions tended to be intrusive or destructive. Air cannons, soot blowers, external vibrators, hammering or costly man entry are all superseded by noninvasive sonic horns. An acoustic cleaner requires no down time and will operate during normal usage of the site. Taking the example of silo cleaning a little further, there are two typical problems.

=== Bridging ===
This is when the silo blocks at the outlet. Previously the problem was addressed by manual cleaning from underneath the silo which in its turn introduced significant risk from falling material when the blockage was cleared. An acoustic cleaner is able to operate from the top of a silo through in situ material to clear the blockage at the base.

=== Rat holing ===
Compaction on the side of a silo. This not only reduces the operating volume in a silo but it also compromises quality control by disrupting the first in first out cycle. Older material compacted on the side of a silo can also start to degrade and produce dangerous gases. An acoustic cleaner will produce sound waves which will make the compacted material resonate at a different rate to the surrounding environment resulting in debonding and clearance.

== Advantages of acoustic cleaners ==
- Repetitive use during operations means that there are fewer unscheduled shut downs.
- Improved material flow by the elimination of hang-ups, blocking and bridging.
- Minimisation of cross contamination by ensuring complete emptying of the environment.
- Improved cleaning and reduction of health and safety risks.
- Increased energy efficiency. Reducing the buildup on heat exchange surfaces results in lower energy usage.
- Extended plant life. Aggressive cleaning regimes are avoided.
- Ease of operation. It is easy to automate the horns either at regular intervals or to tie the sounding in to changes in their environment such as pressure or flow rates.
- Importantly they prevent the material buildup problem from occurring in the first place.

These advantages mean that the financial payback is often very quick.

It is also possible to compare acoustic cleaners directly to alternative solutions.

- Air cannons. These are well established but are expensive with limited coverage thus requiring multi unit purchase. They are also noise intrusive and have a high compressed air consumption.
- Vibrators. These are easy to fit to an empty silo but can cause structural damage as well as contributing to powder compaction.
- Low friction linings. These are very quiet but are expensive to install. Also they are prone to erosion and can then contaminate the environment or product.
- Inflatable pads and liners. Again these are easy to install in an empty silo. They help side wall buildup but have no impact on bridging. They are also hard to maintain and can cause compaction.
- Fluidisation through a 1 way membrane. This can help already compacted material. However they are expensive and difficult to install and maintain. They can also contribute to mechanical interlocking and bridging.

== Specific applications ==
- Boilers. Cleaning of the heat transfer surfaces.
- Electrostatic precipitators. Acoustic cleaners are being used for cleaning hoppers, turning vanes, distribution plates, collecting plates and electrode wires.
- Super heaters, economisers and air heaters.
- Duct work.
- Filters. Acoustic cleaners are used on reverse air, pulse jet and shaker units. They are effective in reducing pressure drop across the collection surface which will increase bag life and prevent hopper pluggage. Generally they can totally replace the both reverse air fans and shaker units and significantly reduce the compressed air requirement on pulse jet filters.
- ID fans. Acoustic cleaning helps to provide a uniform cleaning pattern even for inaccessible parts of the fan. This maintains the balance of the fan.
- Kiln inlet. Acoustic cleaners help to prevent particulate buildup at the kiln inlet and this will minimise nose ring formation.
- Mechanical pre Collectors. Acoustic cleaners help prevent buildup around the impellers and between the tubes.
- Mills. Acoustic cleaners help maintain material flow and also prevent blockages in the pre grind silos. They also help prevent material buildup in the downstream separators and fans.
- Planetary Coolers. Acoustic cleaners help prevent bridging and ensure complete evacuation.
- Precipitator. Acoustic cleaners help clean the turning vanes, distribution plates, collecting plates and electrode wires. They can either assist or replace the mechanical rapping systems. They also prevent particulate buildup in the under hoppers which would otherwise result in opacity spiking.
- Pre heaters. Used in towers, gas risers, cyclones and fans.
- Ship cargo holds. Used both to clean and de aerate current loads.
- Silos and hoppers. To prevent bridging and rat holing.
- Static cyclones. Acoustic cleaners will work both within the cyclone and with the associated duct work.

== See also ==
- Ultrasonic cleaner - Cleaning using higher frequencies than those found in acoustic cleaners.
- Sonic soot blowers
- Ultrasonic homogenizer
