= Vapor degreasing =

Vapor degreasing is a surface finishing process. It involves solvents in vapor form to cleanse the workpiece in preparation for further finishing operations.

== Process ==
The acting principle behind the vapor degreaser process is that the solvents will dissolve the contaminants on the workpiece and remove them by dripping off the part. A basin of solvent is set up with a heating coil to bring the solvent to boil. As the solvent evaporates it rises to the fill line in the chamber, above which is air with a much lower density than the solvent. This contains the vaporized solvent in a closed space where the workpiece is placed. The solvent condenses on the more frigid workpiece and the now liquid solvent dissolves the greases on the part. With the impurities contained in the liquid beads, the solvent runs off the part. Some systems are designed to capture and reclaim this solvent, making the process much more economical.

Other adaptations to the simple system include:

- Several tanks for solvents and rinsing
- Having a solvent spray to coat the workpiece prior to entry into the chamber to speed up the process and to allow for more complex parts to be cleaned. The spray must be below the vapor line.
- Vacuum degreasers

== Benefits ==
- n-propyl bromide (nPB) based solvents for vapor degreasing, in comparison to other solvents for vapor degreasing, are environmentally friendly. nPB solvents are non flammable (no flashpoint), non chlorinated, U.S. EPA SNAP approved, non hazardous waste (per U.S. Department of Transportation), and non ozone layer depleting. However, "Exposure to 1-BP can cause irritation (for example, of the eyes, mucous membranes, upper airways and skin) and can damage the nervous system. Neurologic effects can appear as headaches, dizziness, loss of consciousness, slurred speech, confusion, difficulty walking, muscle twitching, and/or loss of feeling in arms and legs."
- Can be used on electronic parts to remove excess oil, grease, wax and other non-water soluble particles because water is not used.
- Used where water-based system are impractical.
- Cleans and prepares part surfaces for various finishing processes like painting, welding, soldering, and bonding.
- Issues of part oxidation and water spots are not present.
- With vacuum degreasers, there is no solvent emitted. However they have a high cost and low production rate.
