= List of cleaning tools =

Cleaning tools include the following:

- Acoustic cleaning
- Air blaster
- Air knife
- Besom
- Broom
- Brush
- Building maintenance unit
- Camel-hair brush
- Carbon dioxide cleaning
- Carpet beater
- Carpet sweeper
- Chamois leather
- Cleret
- Cyclone dust collector
- Dishwasher
- Dry-ice blasting
- Feather duster
- Floor scrubber
- Floorcloth
- Hataki
- Hot water extraction
- Ice blasting (cleaning)
- Laundroid
- Laundry ball
- Lint remover
- Melamine foam
- Microfibre cloth
- Mop
- Mop bucket cart
- NAV-CO_{2} system
- Needlegun scaler
- Parts washer
- Peg wood
- Peshtemal
- Pigging
- Pipe cleaner
- Pith wood
- Posser
- Pressure washing
- Propane burnisher
- Pumice
- Reason washing machine
- Scrubber (brush)
- Shaker broom vise
- Silent butler
- Soap shaker
- Sonic soot blowers
- Sponge (material)
- Squeegee
- Steam mop
- Strigil
- Swiffer
- Tawashi
- Thor washing machine
- Tongue cleaner
- Turk's head brush
- Vacuum cleaner
- Vacuum truck
- Vapor steam cleaner
- Wash rack
- Washing machine
- Wire brush
