= Sonic soot blowers =

Equipment for preventing soot build-up in chimneys

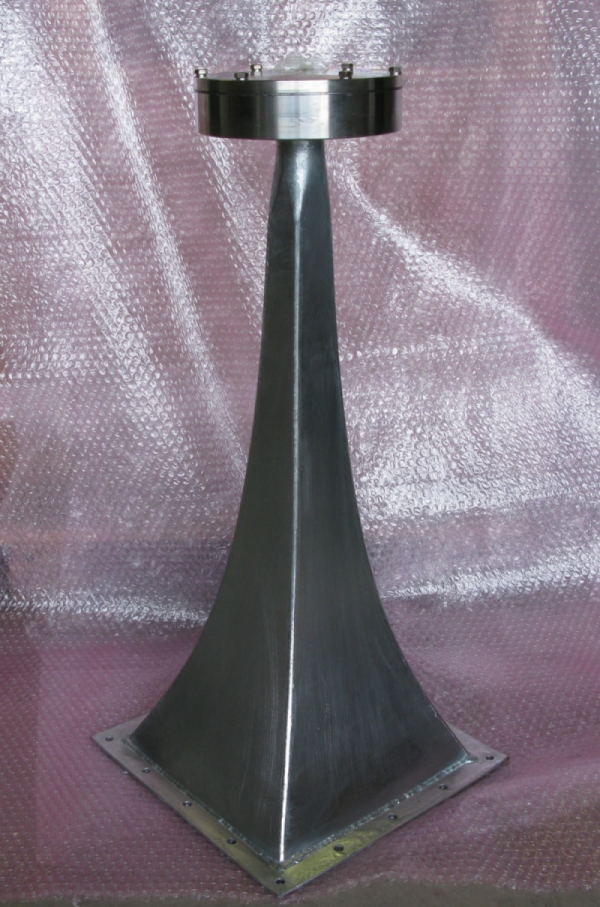
Sonic soot blower

Sonic soot blowers offer a cost-effective and non-destructive means of preventing ash and particulate build-up within the power generation industry. They use high energy – low frequency sound waves that provide 360° particulate de-bonding and at a speed in excess of 344 metres per second. Because they employ non-destructive sound waves, unlike steam soot blowers they eliminate any concerns over corrosion, erosion or mechanical damage and do not produce an effluent stream.

The sonic soot blower operates in the same manner, the ‘base tone’ being produced by passing compressed air into a wave generator which houses a titanium diaphragm causing it to oscillate rapidly. This ‘base tone’ is then converted into a range of selected frequencies ranging from 350 Hz down to 60 Hz by the design and length of the horn section, producing the desired sound frequency at a sound level approaching 200 dB. The sonic soot blower is usually ‘sounded’ for a few seconds at intervals of between 3 and 10 minutes. This ‘sounding’ pattern is normally controlled via the plant’s PLC. However, it may also be operated by such means as a SCADA system, individual timers on each solenoid valve or via a manual ball valve.

== Comparison ==
The sonic soot blower can in some ways be compared to a musical reed instrument such as an oboe, where the ‘base tone’ is created by blowing air over a reed and then converting this ‘base tone’ into a particular high or low note, depending on how far the sound wave has to travel along inside the body of the instrument.

== Construction ==
Sonic soot blowers are normally constructed from fabricated, 316 grade stainless steel as opposed to some sonic horns which are manufactured from heavy cast iron. For installations in harsher environments, such as high temperature or acidic gas streams, other types of stainless steels are used such as 310, 316 and 825.

== Performance ==
Sonic soot blowers create a rapid series of very powerful sound induced pressure fluctuations which when transmitted into the ash or particulate, cause them to de-bond from other particles and from the heat transfer surface to which they are bonded and so carried away in the gas stream. This prevents the ash from building up and sintering onto the boiler tubes thus significantly reducing thermal efficiency. This is in contrast to the operating principles of steam soot blowers which are usually only employed at most once every eight hours by which time the ash has built up and baked hard onto the heat transfer surfaces. The steam soot blower then tries to blast away his hard deposit, usually only from the leading edge of the steam tubes.

== Advantages ==
Sonic soot blowers are a proven alternative to conventional steam soot blowers in power generation plants which burn a range of fossil fuels and other waste fuels including biofuels. Depending on the application and boiler plant design, sonic soot blowers usually totally replace existing high maintenance steam soot blowers whether of the retractable or rotary type. In a few cases, sonic soot blowers can be used to supplement steam soot blowers. Sonic soot blower cleaning technologies can be applied in superheaters, generating sections, economizers, and airheaters as well as downstream equipment such as electrostatic precipitators, baghouse filters and fans.

== Advantages ==
The main advantages of sonic soot blowers over steam soot blowers are:

- Extremely low maintenance or operational costs
- Elimination of tube corrosion and erosion problems
- Elimination of opacity spikes due to more regular, more efficient cleaning
- No structural damage to tube bundles or boiler structure
- 360° cleaning of all tube surfaces – not harsh leading edge tube cleaning as with steam soot blowers
- Prevention of ash build up and sintering on steam tubes due to sonic soot blowers regular operation
- Eco-friendly – helps to combat global climate change and the effect of global warming

== See also ==
- Vacuum blasting
