= Dustpan =

Cleaning tool

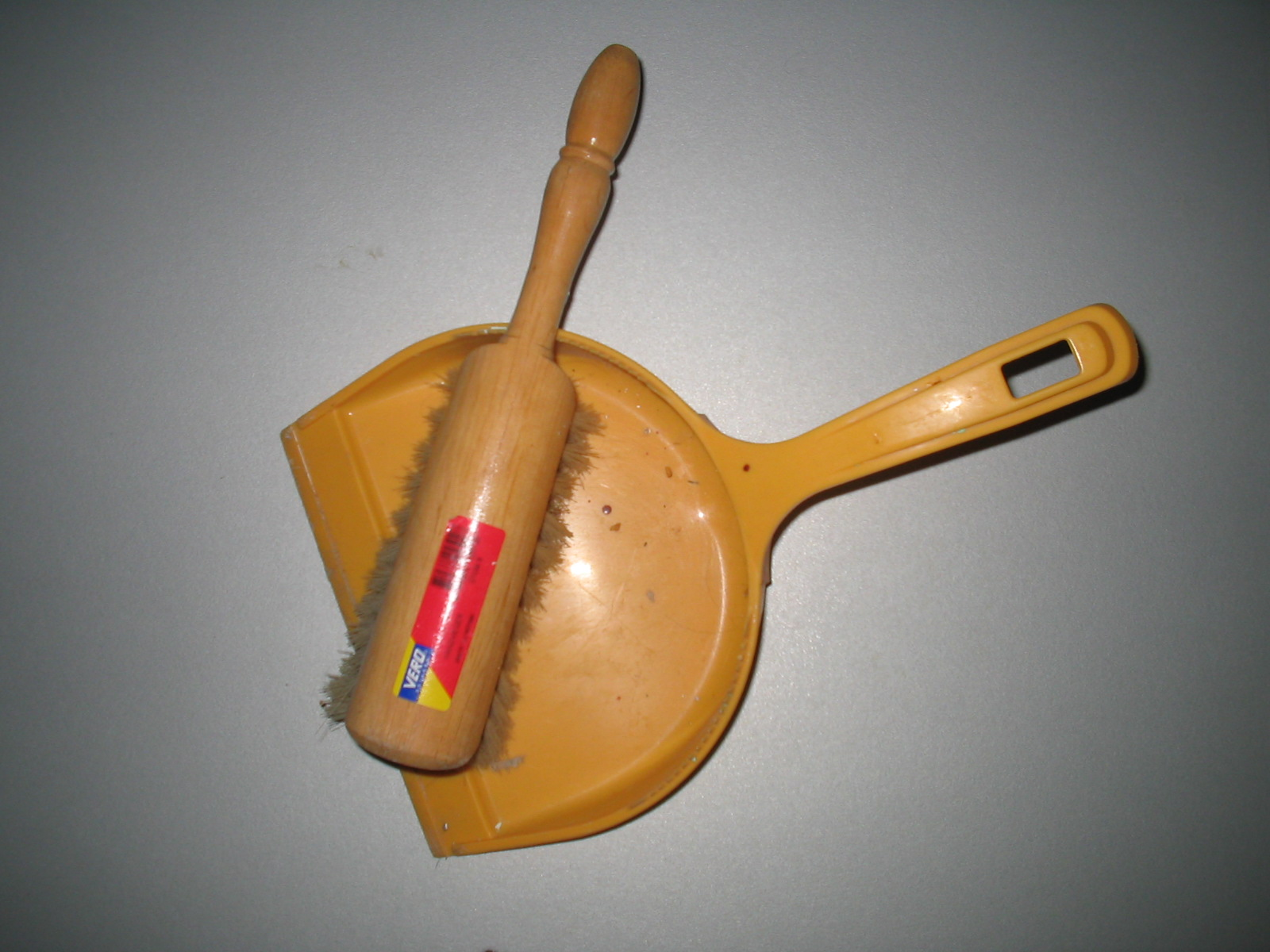
Dustpan and brush

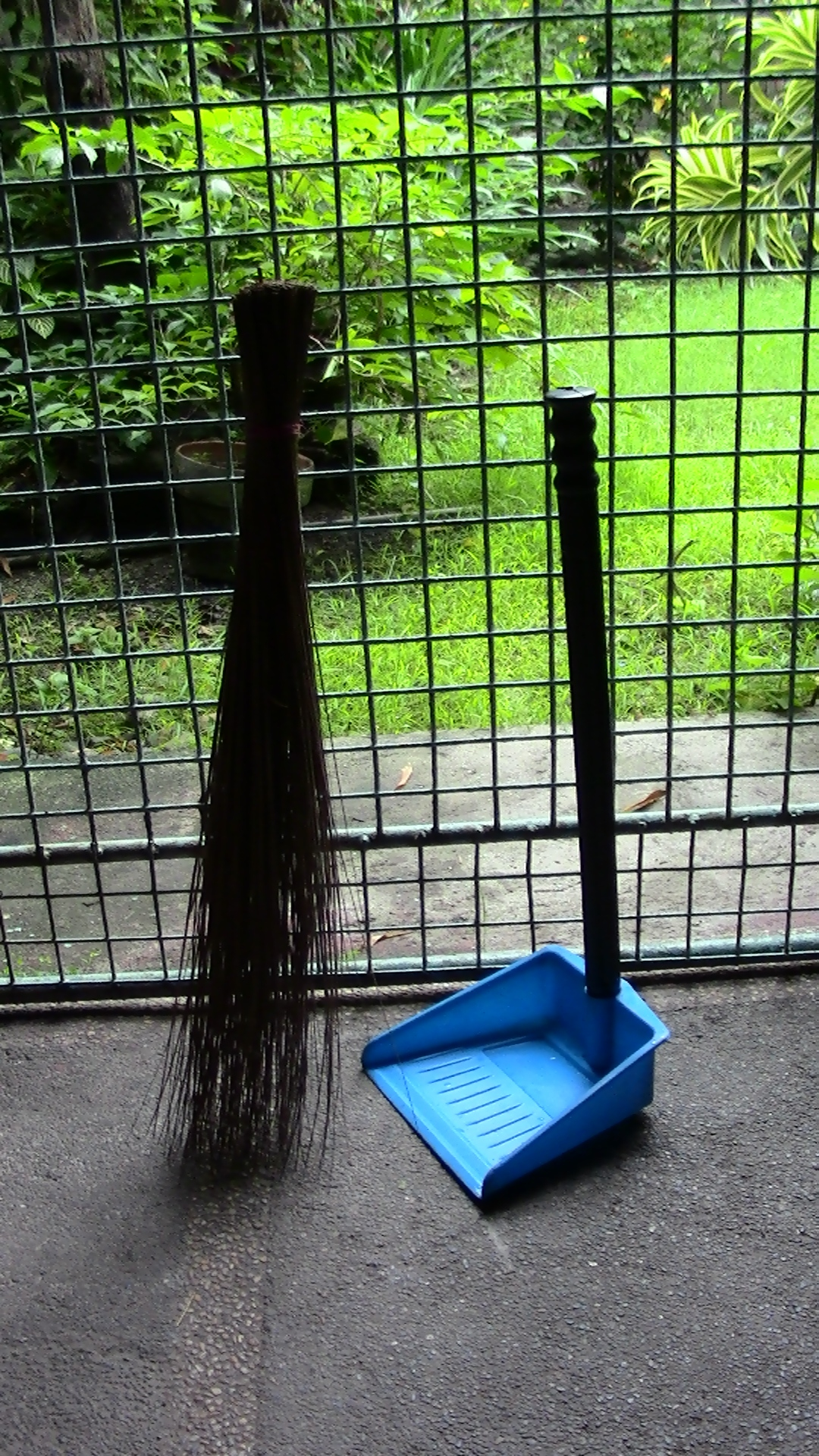
Hard broom and plastic dustpan.

A dustpan, the small version of which is also known as a "hearth brush and shovel” (from its use of cleaning the fireplace hearth), is a cleaning utensil. The dustpan is commonly used in combination with a broom or long brush. The small dustpan may appear to be a type of flat scoop. Though often hand-held for home use, industrial and commercial enterprises use a hinged variety on the end of a long handle to allow the user to stand instead of stoop while using it.

Handheld dustpans may be used with either a full-size broom or with a smaller broom or a brush. This second combination may be sold as one unit. A variant on the dustpan is the silent butler, a handheld, lidded dustpan.

== Materials and design ==
Dustpans typically features a flat, angled surface for ease of debris collection, with raised sides to contain the swept materials. They are manufactured from various materials including plastic, metal, and composite materials. The different materials affect durability, weight, and price. Modern dustpans may incorporate features such as rubber edges to improve debris collection efficiency, ergonomic handles for user comfort, and integrated brushes or brooms for convenience. There is a growing trend towards producing dustpans from recycled or eco-friendly materials to reduce environmental impact. These sustainable materials include bamboo, wood, aluminum, and recycled plastics.

Small dustpans are typically used for light, everyday cleaning tasks. Dimensions may range from 20 cm to 30 cm in width, with a capacity sufficient for small amounts of debris. Large and industrial dustpans are designed for heavy-duty use, with widths exceeding 30 cm and larger capacities to handle more significant volumes of debris.

== History ==
In 1858, the first patent for a dustpan was given to T. E. McNeill. This design featured a flat scoop with a handle, which could be held in one hand while sweeping with the other. This basic design laid the foundation for modern dustpans.

In 1897, Lloyd P. Ray, an African American inventor, patented an improved dustpan with a more ergonomic handle and a raised edge to prevent debris from spilling out. This design was influential in shaping the dustpans we use today.
