= Pegwood =

Pegwood is a common name for several plants and may refer to:

- Cornus
- Euonymus

== See also ==
- peg wood
