= Horse pond =

A horse pond is a body of water used, and generally created, for the benefit of horses. Horses can drink water and wash their legs in these ponds. While horse ponds were once important for the welfare of horses, they are less common in the age of powered transportation. In the equine community, horse ponds are not commonly seen due to the invention of wash racks, water troughs, and antibacterial soaps, which did not exist when horses were used as a primary source of transportation. These ponds are still used today, however, they are more uncommon because they are less sanitary than the alternative options, and are harder to maintain.

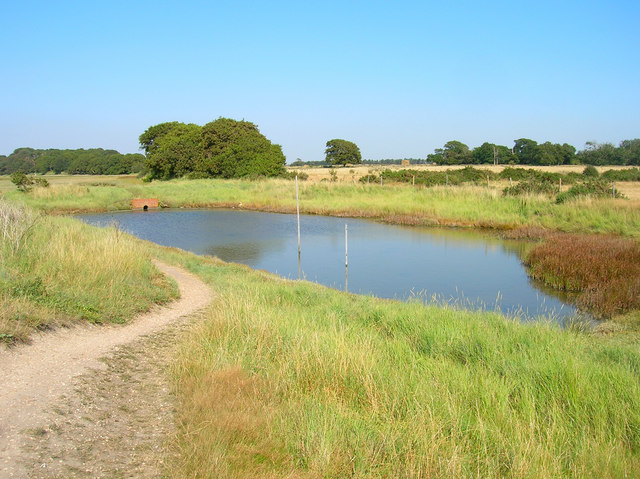
A horse pond by the footpath from West Wittering to Itchenor

== Construction ==
When a horse pond was constructed in well-drained soil, and not supplied by a brook, it was lined with puddling, about 6-7 inches thick, constructed of clay and lime, rammed or trampled home. The lime was to prevent worms burrowing through the clay and making it porous. Over the puddling, a causeway of tone and sand is laid, to protect the puddling from the horses' hooves.

Horse ponds, especially by roads, were often designed so that the horses, and their vehicle, could be driven in one end and out the other. The water would rise no higher than the horses' knees.

== Equine Risks ==
Like most animals, access to clean water is critical in order for horses to survive. While horse ponds can be beneficial to the welfare of horses, they can also expose them to many different diseases. These diseases can be passed onto horses if they drink water that has been contaminated by nearby wildlife.

Horse ponds can also pose a risk to the health of horses if its water is poisoned with fertilizer runoff from local farms and/or by different types of algae. It is important to be able to recognize the signs of ponds with dangerous algae blooms to protect the horses that use it as a water source. It is also important to provide water troughs along with horse ponds because there is a chance that they can freeze or dry up, leaving horses without a water source. Horse ponds must be kept clean for the horses to maintain a healthy water supply and well-being.

In horses, it is also important to keep their legs dry to prevent infections like mud fever. There are many types of bacteria that cause this infection, however, all of them are most commonly found in winter and summer months when conditions are wet and muddy Knowing this, it is important to recognize that horse ponds could increase the chances of a horse getting mud fever if they are standing in water for prolonged amounts of time.

== Environmental Risks ==
While horse ponds can pose risks to horses themselves, they can also pose problems for the environment. In the past, horse ponds were man-made structures used as watering holes and a place to wash the mud off of horses’ legs. Today, people are allowing their horses to drink out of and swim in natural ponds. These activities are an issue because if a horse defecates in the pond, it can pollute the local groundwater, cause excessive algae growth due to the high levels of nitrogen in the manure, and potentially spread dangerous pathogens such as E. coli to humans. Environmentalists recommend restricting horses from streams, lakes, ponds, and wetlands to prevent the contamination of surface waterways and groundwater.

== Maintenance ==
As previously mentioned, horse ponds can produce algae that can poison horses and cause them illness or even death. Owners can prevent this from happening by knowing the signs that indicate contaminated water and by using algae control products. Another way for owners to maintain their horse pond is by lining it with dark materials to prevent the growth of algae.

== Alternatives ==
In order to protect the environment and to ensure the health of your horses, wash racks, water troughs, and antibacterial soaps can act as a beneficial alternative to horse ponds. Wash racks provide an area for owners to wash their horses’ legs, antibacterial soaps help remove dirt, grime, and kills bacteria on horses’ legs, and water troughs provide horses with access to clean drinking water. All three of these alternatives could reduce the risk of infections in horses and can protect surface waterways and groundwater from pollution.

Alternatives

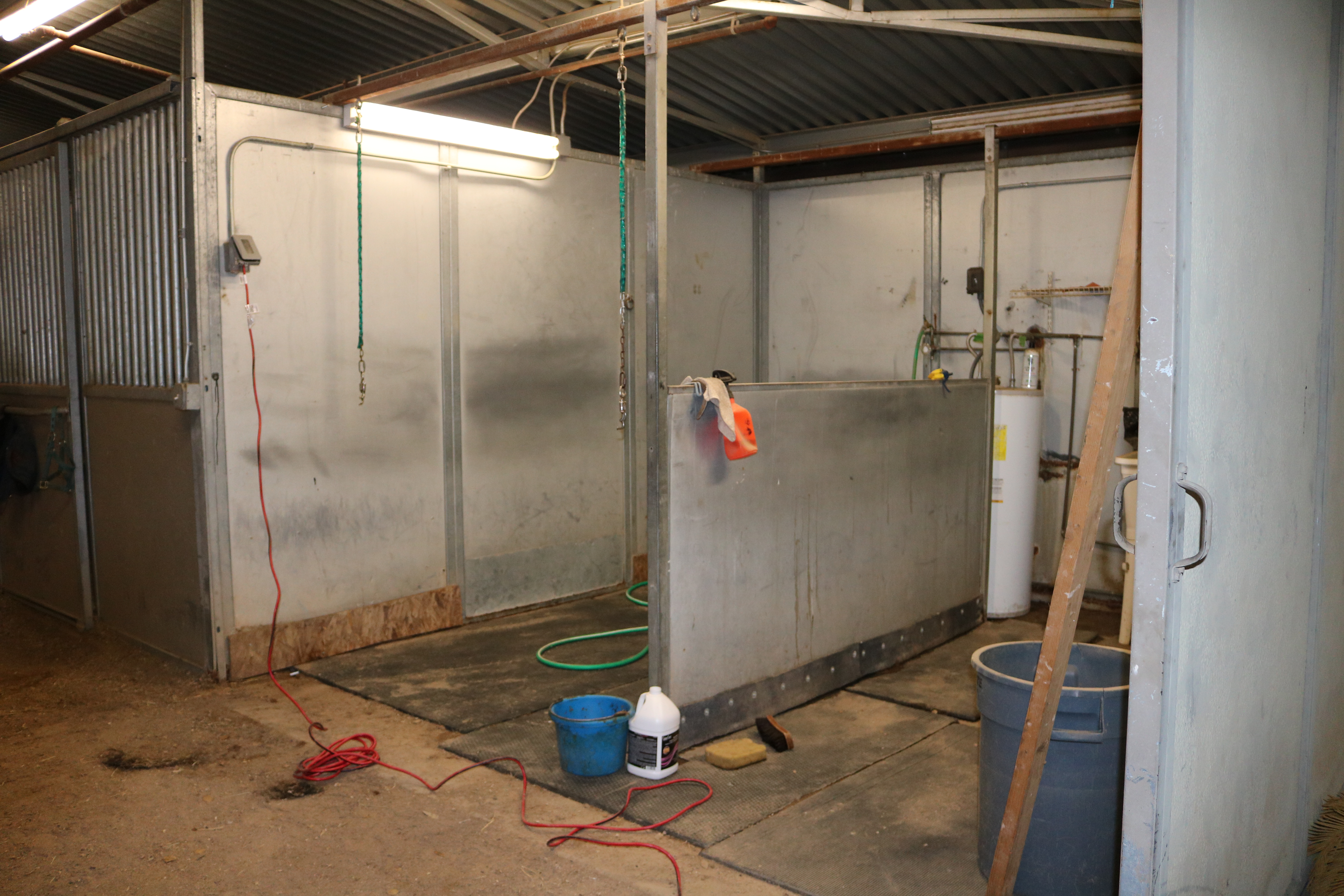
Wash rack

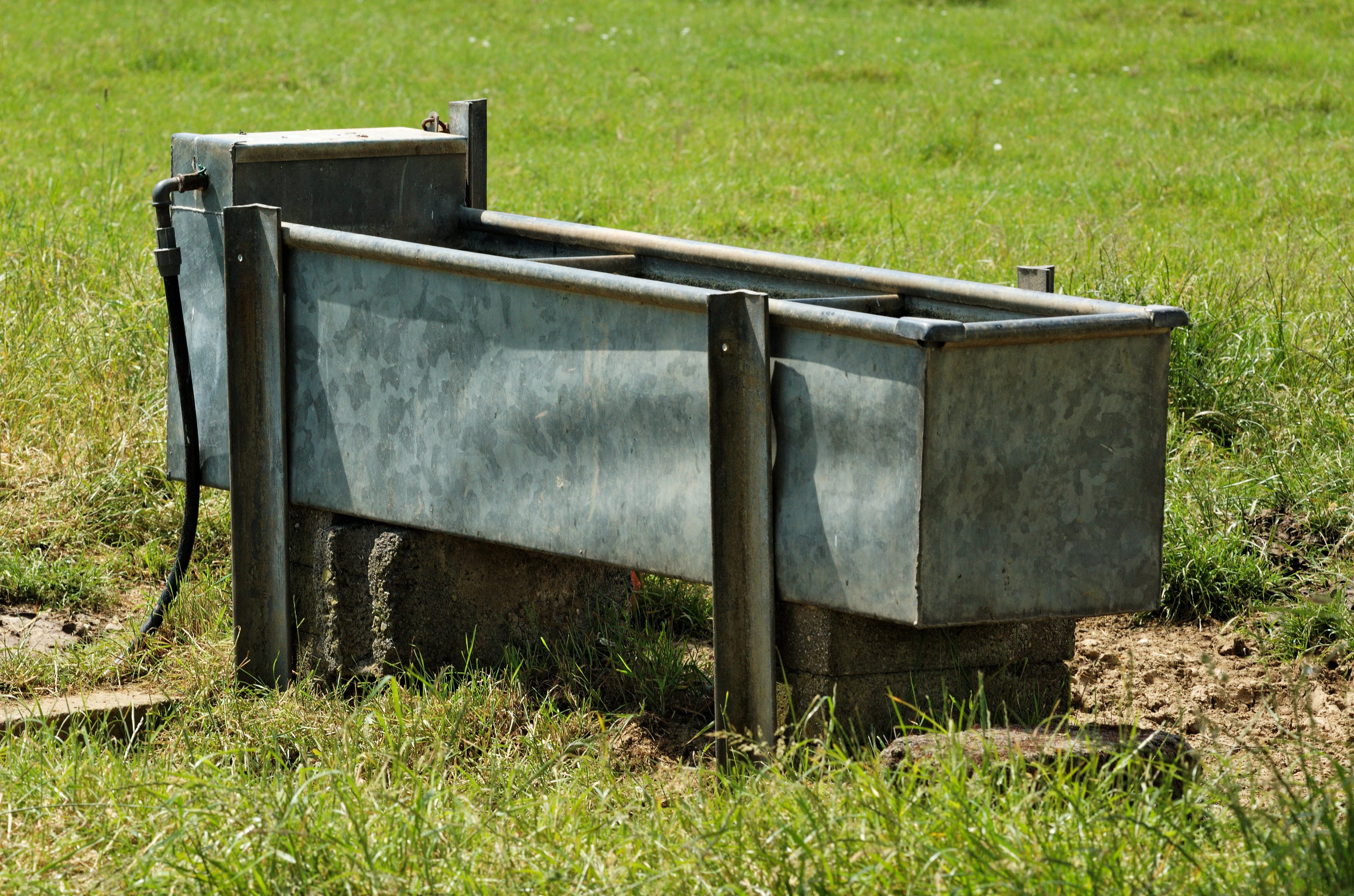
Water trough

== See also ==
- Horse trough
- Wash Rack
- Antibacterial Soap
- Plunge dip
