= Bristle blasting =

Mechanical abrasion cleaning process

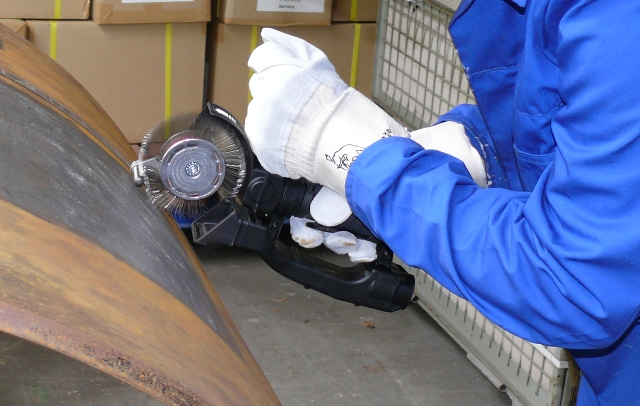
Bristle blasting. The 'accelerator bar' may be seen to the left of the brush wheel.

Bristle blasting is a mechanical abrasion cleaning process that is performed on metallic surfaces by a brush-like rotary power tool. The tool consists of sharpened, high-carbon steel wire bristle tips that are designed with a forward-angle bend, i.e., the shank of the wire is bent in the direction of tool rotation. During operation, the rotating bristle tips are brought into direct contact with the metallic surface, whereby the bristle tips strike the surface with kinetic energy that is equivalent to processes that use grit blast media. This repeated contact of sharp bristle tips with the target surface results in localized impact, rebound, and the formation of craters, thereby simultaneously cleaning and coarsening the surface, while exposing a contamination-free base metal.

== Differences from conventional rotary brushes ==
The difference from conventional wire-brushing with an angle grinder lies first with the mounting of the bristles in the rotating brush. With a conventional rotary brush, the wire bristles are mounted rigidly in the hub, bristles sometimes being twisted or knotted in groups for extra stiffness. With bristle blasting, the wires are mounted resiliently in a flexible belt. As the brush rotates, immediately before contacting the work, rows of bristles are trapped behind a fixed "accelerator bar", which causes them to bend backwards in their flexible mount. As the bristles pass the accelerator bar, they are released to spring forwards. The extra energy stored by each bristle when being flexed backwards is added to its kinetic energy when released. This gives a more violent impact with the workpiece, thus greater cleaning power, compared to a simple rotary brush at the same speed.

As the geometry of the brush is also distorted from circular by the accelerator bar, the contact angle of the bristle tips with the surface is also nearer to perpendicular than the tangential contact of a circular rotary brush. This encourages a cleaning action and reduces the burnishing which can be a problem with rotary brushes, where a surface is increasingly polished, without removing recessed surface adherents. The steeper action of the tips encourages a pitting effect on the surface, which may be considered useful for further painting.

== Details ==
The cleaning performance of the bristle blasting process is a consequence of synchronized impact of the bristle tips onto the target surface. The tool head with the bristle belt rotates at approximately 2,500 rpm. A so-called 'accelerator bar' detains the bristle tips and by releasing them increases their kinetic energy with which they strike the surface. Immediately after the bristles strike the corroded steel surface, they retract (rebound) from the surface ('single-impact'), which results in corrosion removal and a micro-indentation that exposes the sheer metallic surface. The multitude of such primary impact craters generates a texture and surface which in visual cleanliness and roughness (anchor profile) mimics those obtained by grit blasting processes. The cleaned and coarsened surface is deemed favorable for the subsequent application and adhesion of protective films and industrial coatings.

== Process and equipment ==
Bristle blasting tools are fabricated from high-carbon steel wires that protrude through a flexible circular belt. The belt, in turn, is attached to a rotating hub, which is powered by an electric or pneumatically driven spindle. The tool is lightweight, portable, and easily implemented by workers without the need for elaborate set-up or sophisticated safety apparatus.

== Applications ==
Bristle blasting is most frequently used for removal of unwanted films and layers of corrosion that can form on metallic surfaces. Common applications include cleaning, preparation, and refurbishment of iron and steel components that are used for fabricating bridges, ships, and pipeline systems.

== See also ==
- Abrasive blasting
- Shot peening
- Wire brush
- Needlegun scaler
