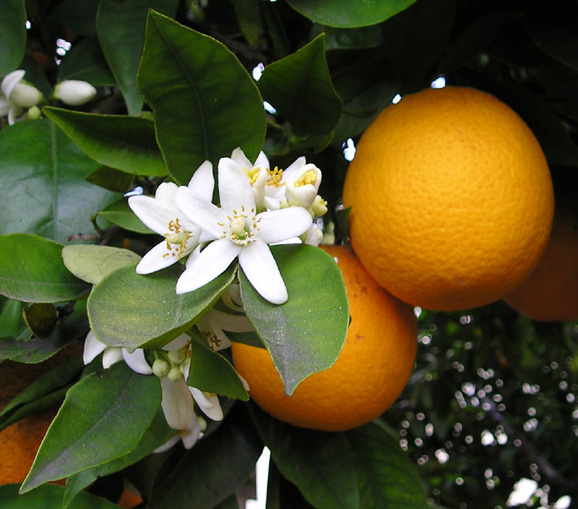

Scientific classification
- Kingdom: Plantae
- Clade: Embryophytes
- Clade: Tracheophytes
- Clade: Angiosperms
- Clade: Eudicots
- Clade: Rosids
- Order: Sapindales
- Family: Rutaceae
- Genus: Citrus
- Species: C. × sinensis

Binomial name
- Citrus × sinensis (L.) Osbeck
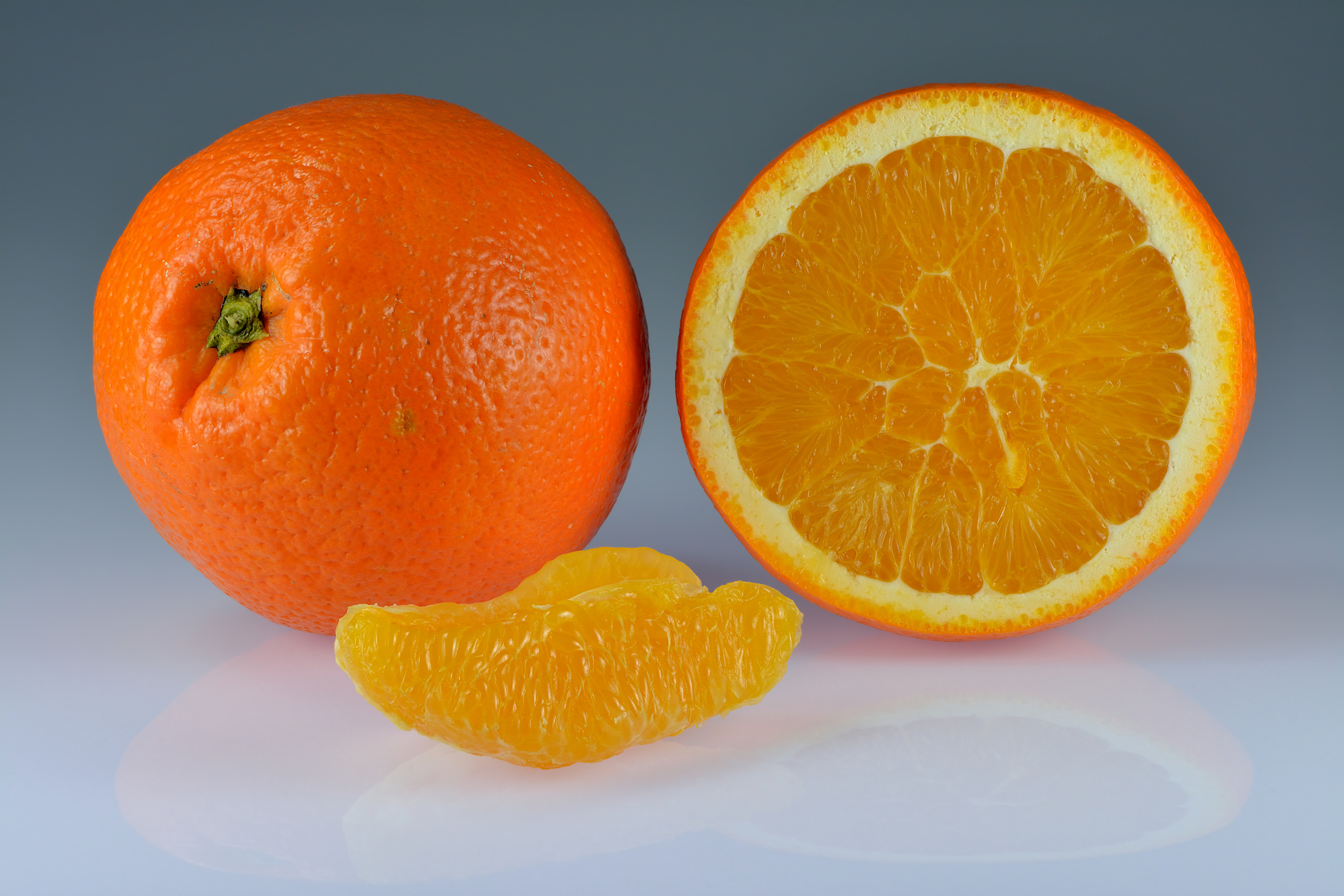

= Citrus × sinensis =

Sweet orange

Cultivated trees bearing sweet oranges

Citrus × sinensis (sometimes written Citrus sinensis), the sweet orange, is a broadleaf evergreen hybrid between pomelo (Citrus maxima) and mandarin (Citrus reticulata). Hybrid sweet oranges are commonly cultivated fruits that include Valencia oranges, blood oranges and navel oranges.

== Uses ==
The orange fruit is an important agricultural product, used for both the juicy fruit pulp and the aromatic peel (rind). Orange blossoms (the flowers) are used in several different ways, as are the leaves and wood of the tree.

=== Flowers ===
- The orange blossom, which is the state flower of Florida, is highly fragrant and traditionally associated with good fortune. It has long been popular in bridal bouquets and head wreaths.
- Orange blossom essence is an important component in the making of perfume.
- Orange blossom petals can also be made into a delicately citrus-scented counterpart to rosewater, known as "orange blossom water" or "orange flower water". It is a common ingredient in French and Middle Eastern cuisines, especially in desserts and baked goods. In some Middle Eastern countries, drops of orange flower water are added to disguise the unpleasant taste of hard water drawn from wells or stored in qullahs (traditional Egyptian water pitchers made of porous clay). In the United States, orange flower water is used to make orange blossom scones and marshmallows.
- In Spain, fallen blossoms are dried and used to make orange tea.
- Orange blossom honey (or citrus honey) is obtained by putting beehives in the citrus groves while trees bloom. By this method, bees also pollinate seeded citrus varieties. This type of honey has an orangey taste and is highly prized.

=== Leaves ===
- Orange leaves can be boiled to make orange tea.

=== Wood ===
- Orangewood sticks are used as cuticle pushers in manicures and pedicures, as spudgers for manipulating slender electronic wires and as peg wood in watchmaking.
- Orangewood is used in the same way as mesquite, oak, and hickory for smoking grilled meat.
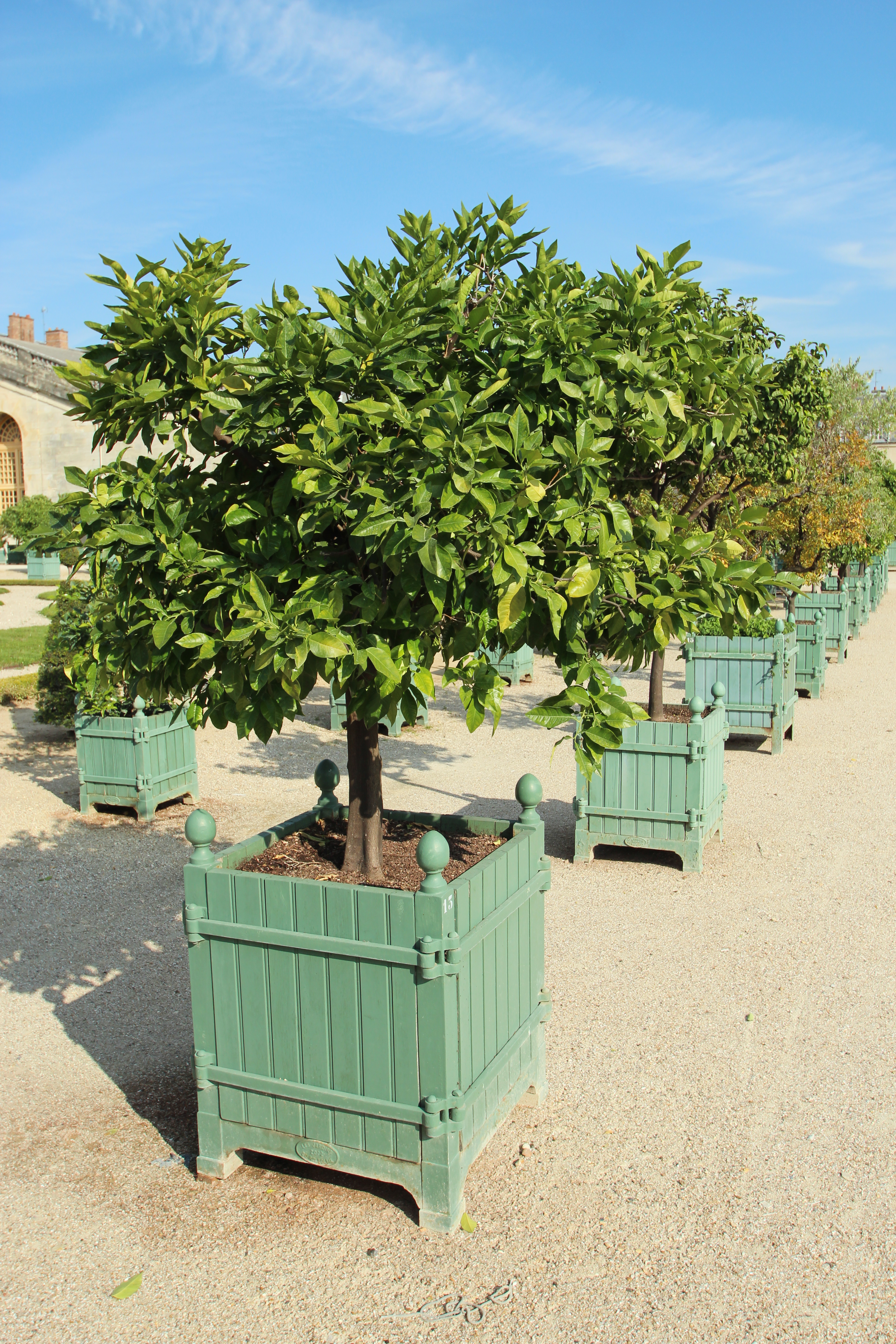
Orange trees in movable pots, so that they can be placed indoors for the winter

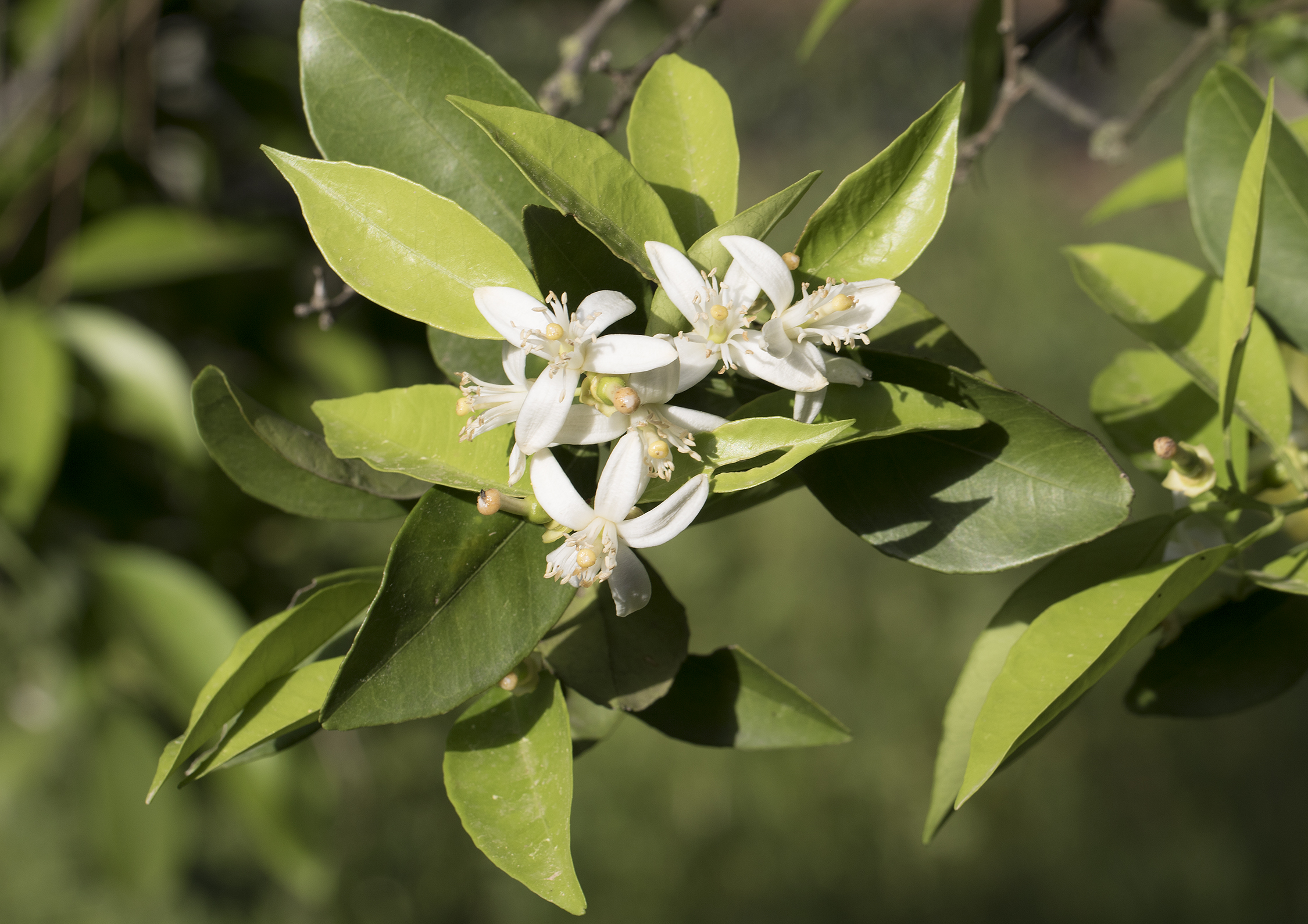
Orange flowers

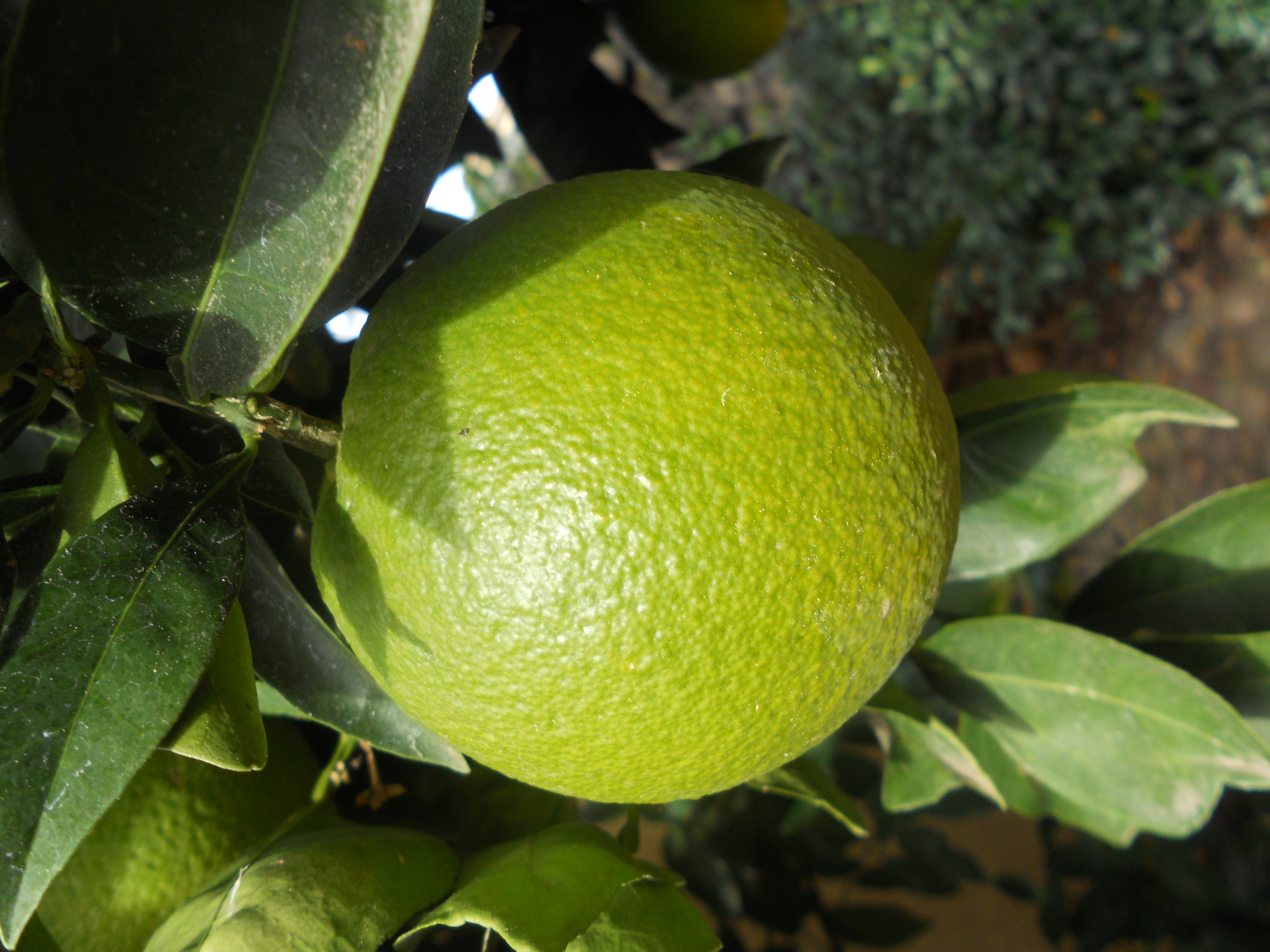
Unripened fruit

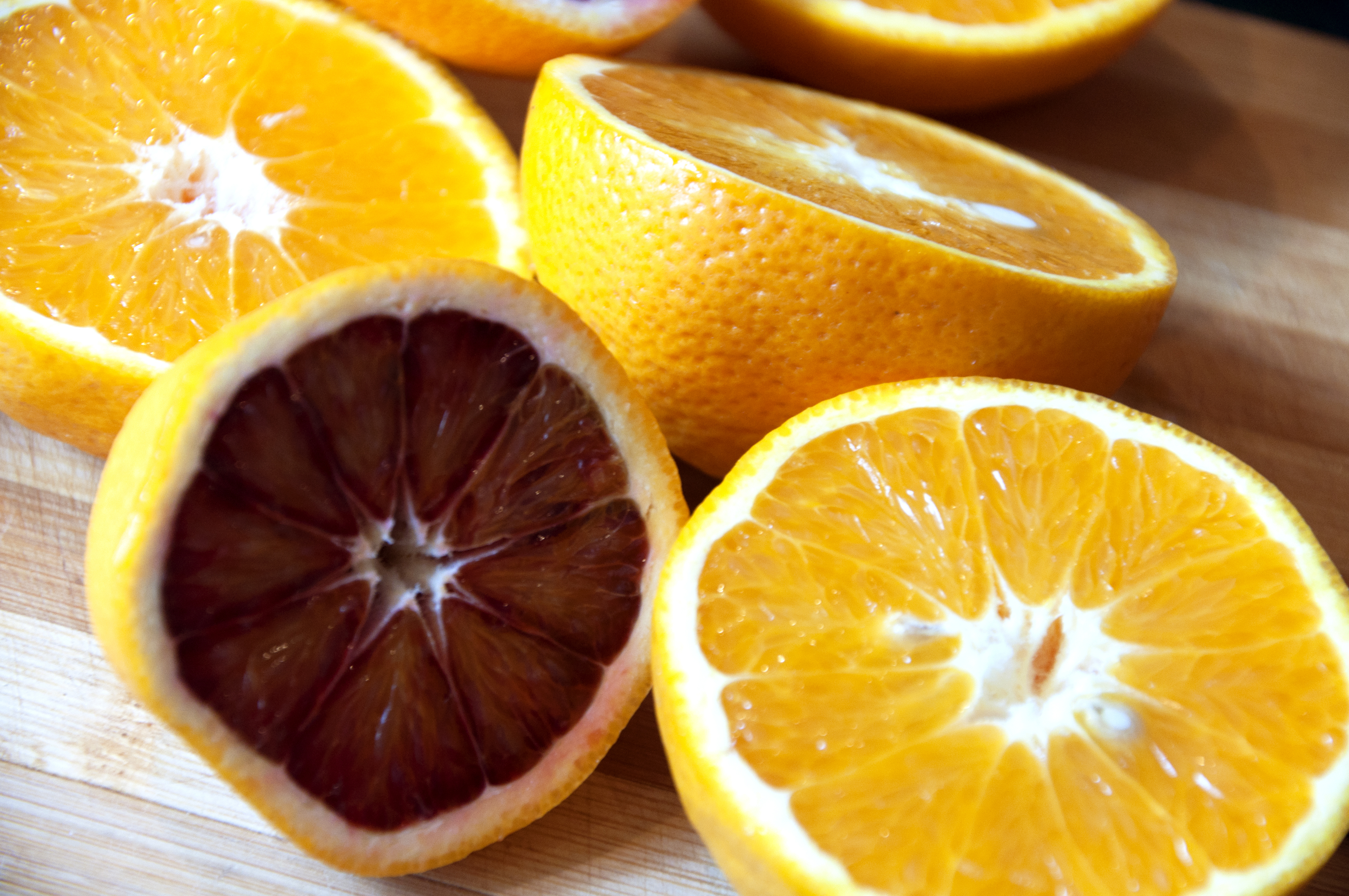
Blood oranges

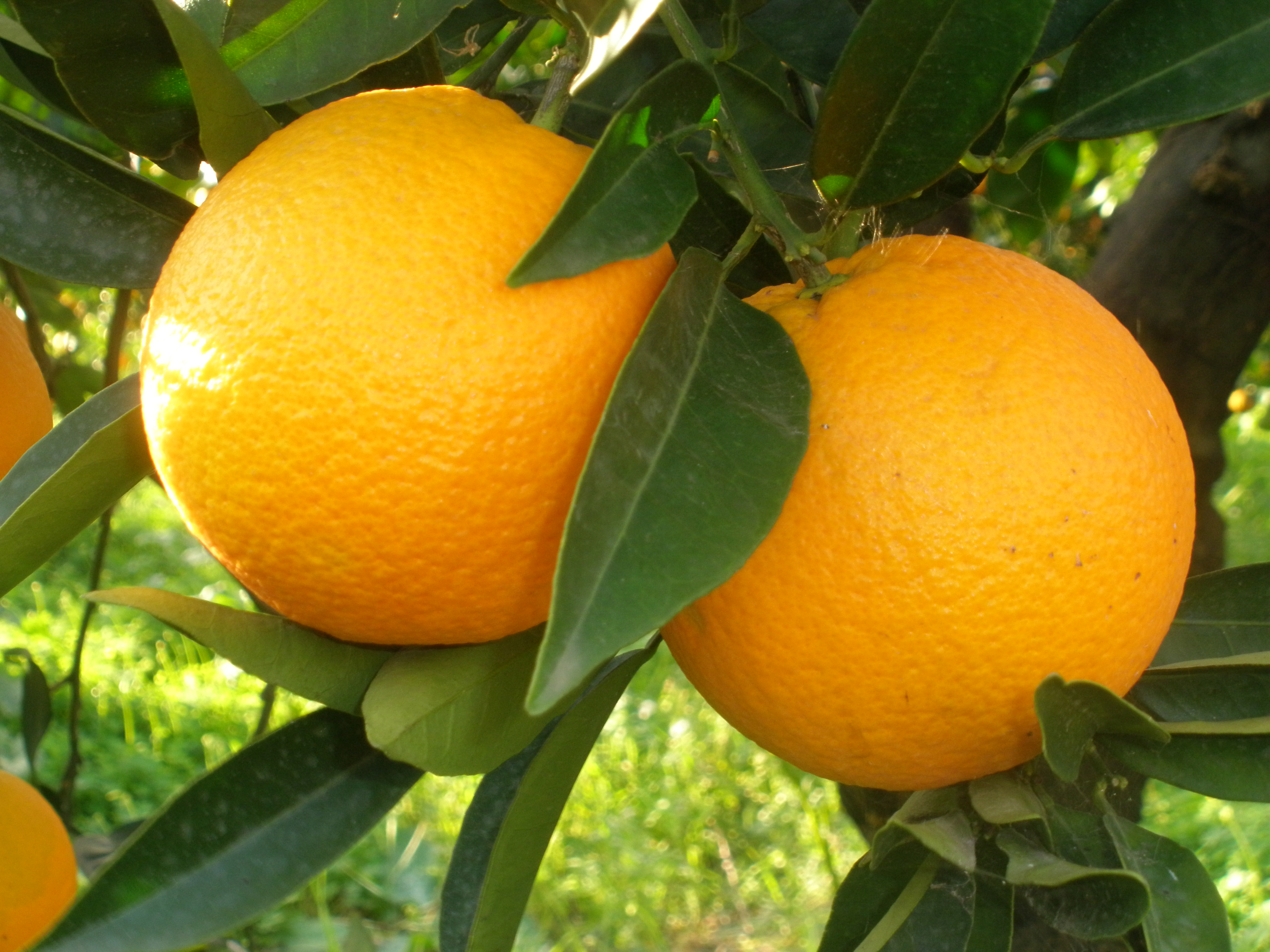
Oranges on the branch

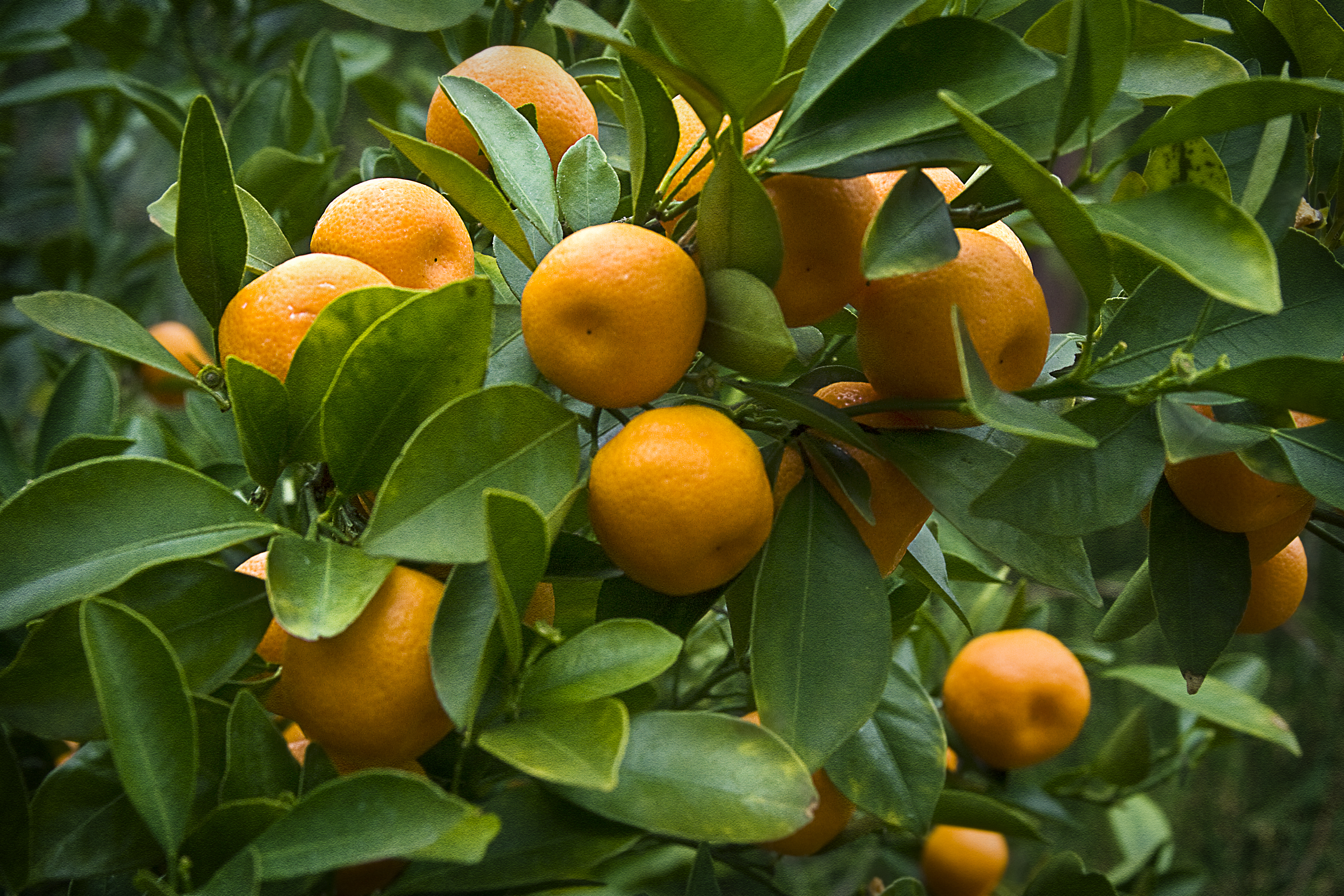
Oranges on a tree

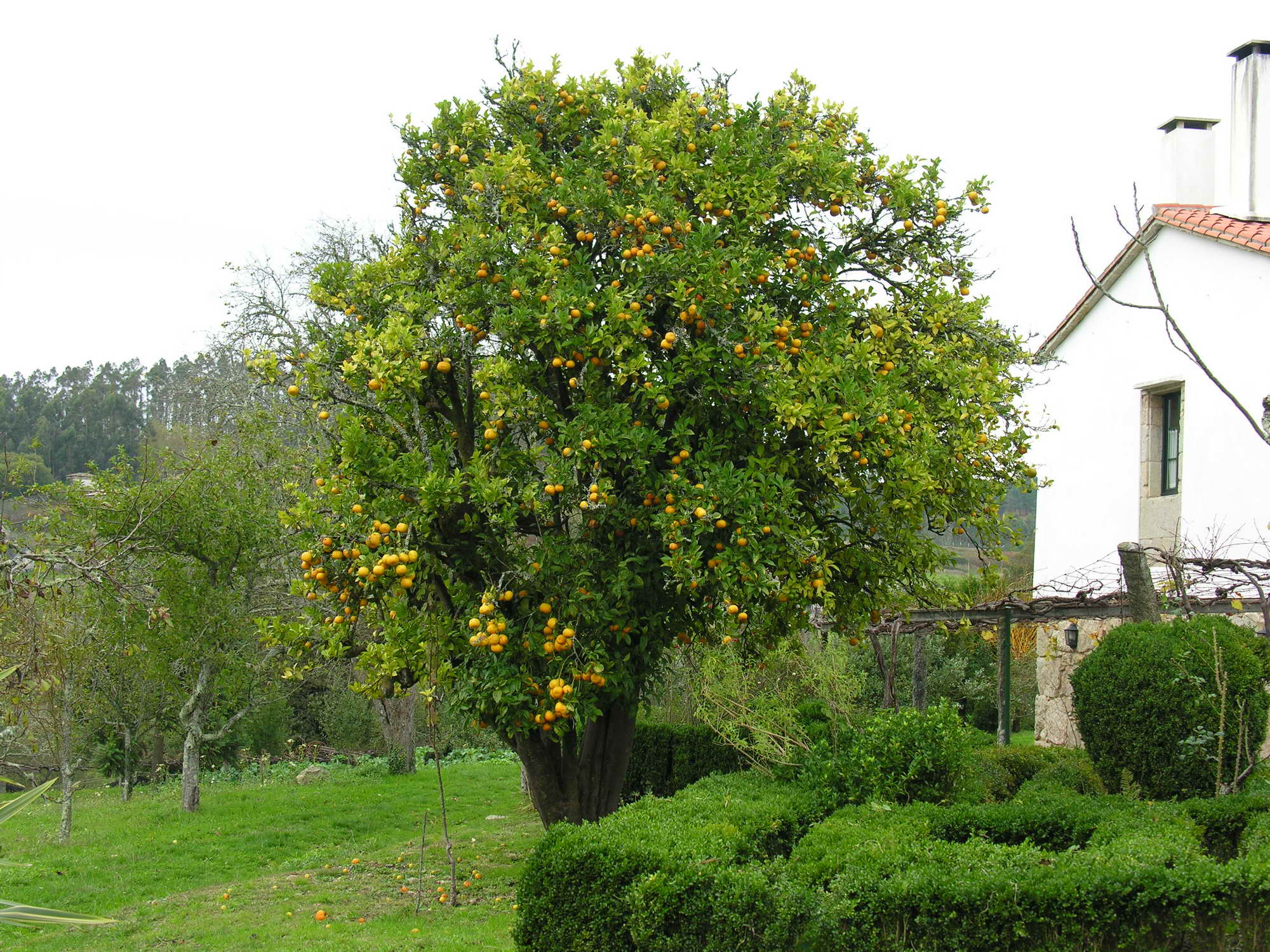
A mature tree in Galicia, Spain

== Threats ==
Giant swallowtail caterpillars (Papilio cresphontes) cause serious damage to this crop, especially to young trees.

== Genomics ==
The first draft genome sequence of sweet orange was published in 2013 using a doubled-haploid line from the cultivar Valencia. The assembled sequence covered 87.3% of the estimated 367 Mb genome, which has 18 chromosomes; 29,445 protein-coding genes were predicted. In 2026, the Valencia sweet orange genome was reannotated using knowledge of the haplotypes. The updated annotation identified 28,076 and 27,665 protein-coding genes in the two haplotypes, respectively, and expanded the annotation of transcript isoforms and allele-specific expression. Also in 2026, a chromosome-scale, haplotype-resolved genome assembly of the Brazilian sweet orange cultivar 'Pera IAC' was published. The assembly spans approximately 620 Mb across two parental haplotypes, each reconstructed into nine chromosome-scale assemblies (2n = 18), has a BUSCO completeness score of 99.9%, and includes 58,171 predicted gene models.

== See also ==
- The orange blossom gives its touristic nickname to the Costa del Azahar ("Orange blossom coast"), the Castellón seaboard.
- Citrus greening disease - bacterial disease killing orange trees and other citrus fruits grown
