= Hataki =

Japanese household cleaning tool

A hataki (叩き) is a type of household cleaning tool that originated in Japan. Consisting of durable cloth strips attached to a stick or pole, it is used for moving dust from surfaces onto the floor where it can be swept up or vacuumed. Similar to a feather duster, it is not to be confused with an ōnusa.

This duster, made of a bamboo pole and cloth strips, is a fixture in every Japanese home.

The hataki does not trap dust but, with its familiar sound, pushes it onto the floor where it can be swept up.
