= Coal shovel =

Shovel designed for shoveling coal

A coal shovel is a shovel designed for shoveling coal, coke or similar fuels, and on occasions does a double duty removing ash from the fireplace, firebox or furnace.

A large coal shovel is used by the fireman of a coal-fired steam locomotive unless an automatic stoker is used.

Smaller coal shovels of similar shape are used to stoke domestic fireplaces.

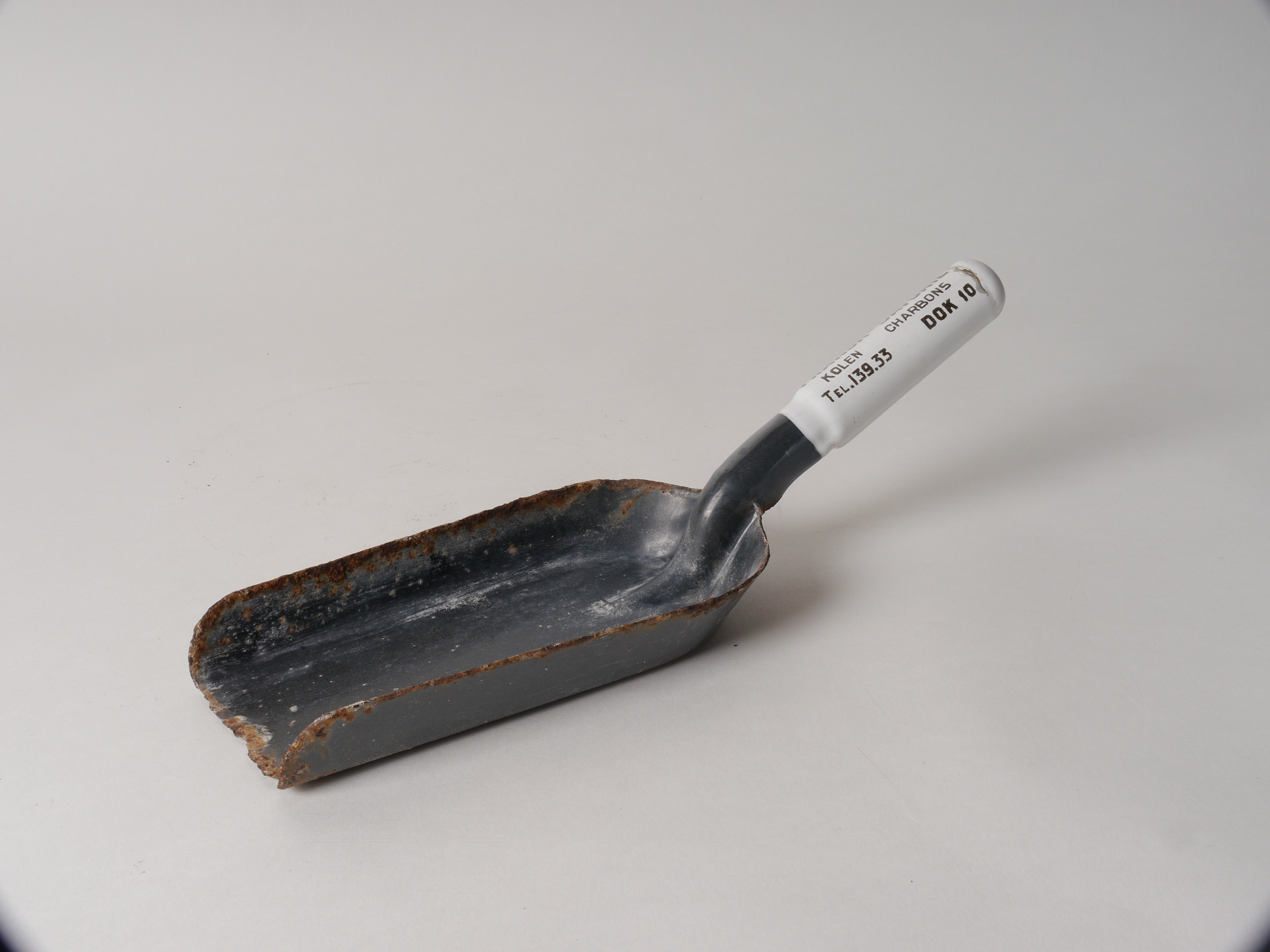
Metal coal shovel with enamelled handle - Collection Museum of Industry Ghent

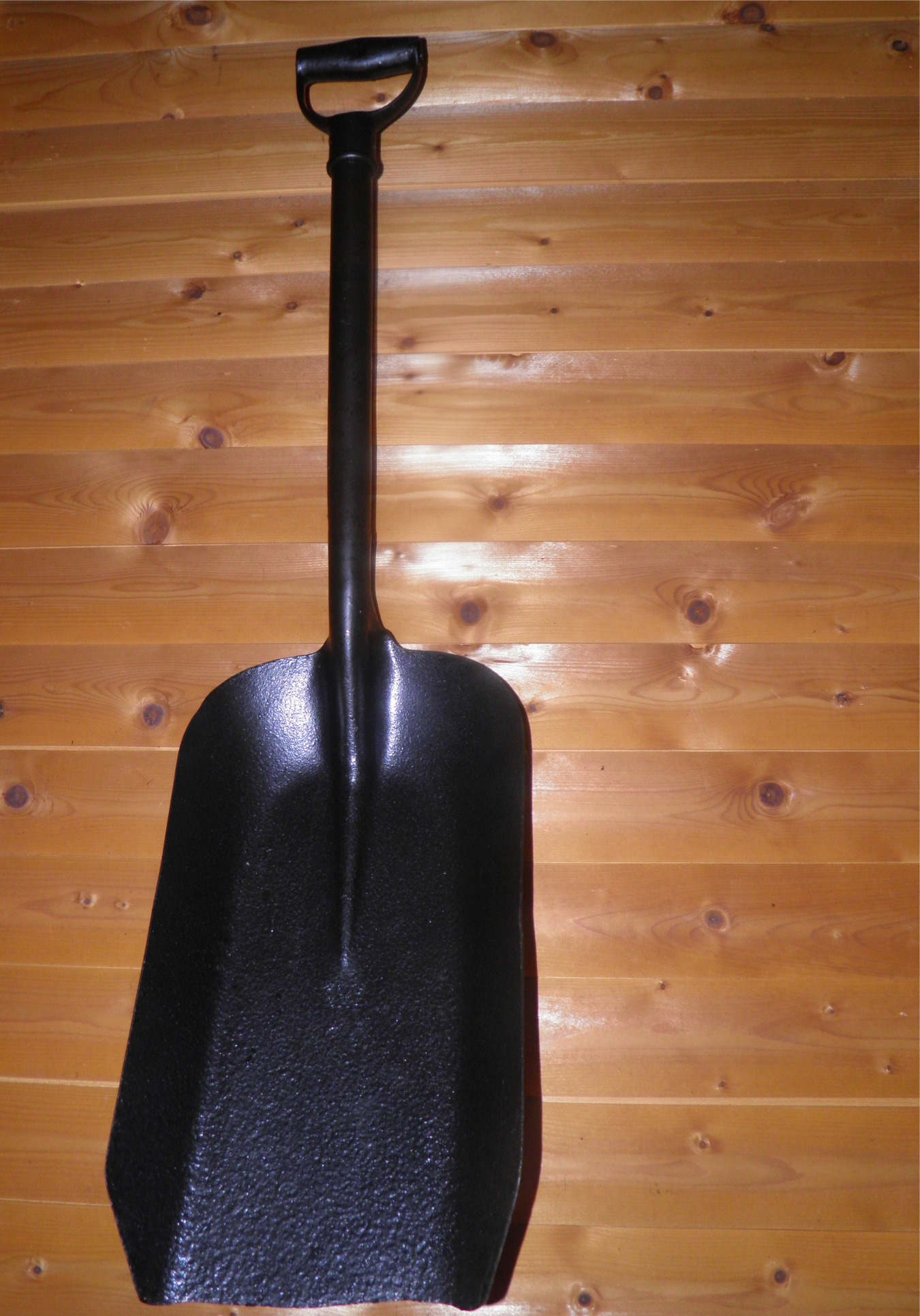
Coal shovel for a tender locomotive
