= Shovel =

Tool for digging, lifting, and moving bulk materials

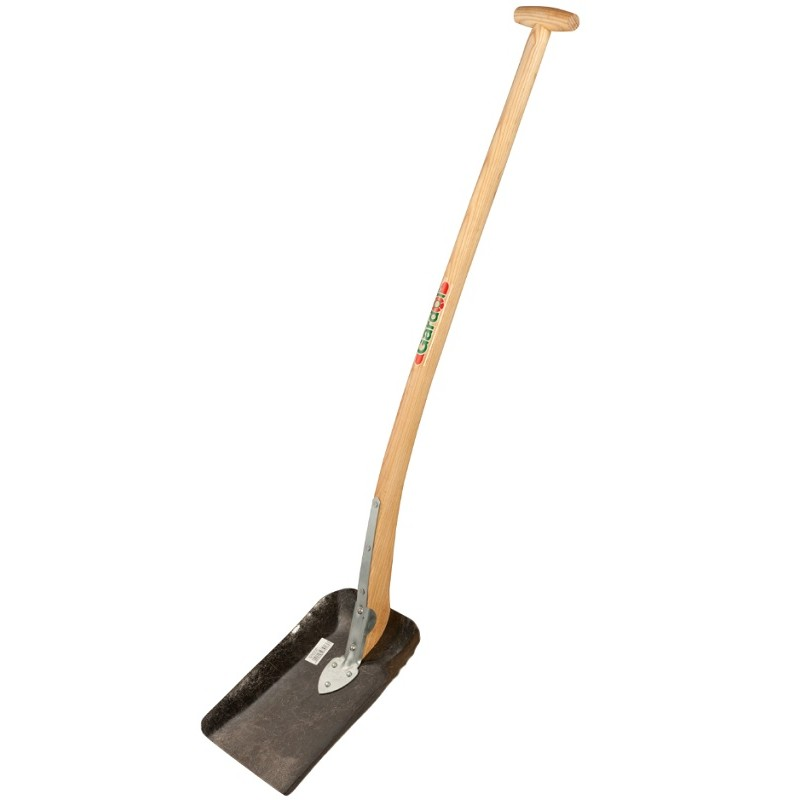
A typical shovel

A shovel is a tool used for digging, lifting, and moving bulk materials, such as soil, coal, gravel, snow, sand, or ore. Most shovels are hand tools consisting of a broad blade fixed to a medium-length handle. Shovel blades are usually made of sheet steel or hard plastics and are very strong. Shovel handles are usually made of wood (especially specific varieties such as ash or maple) or glass-reinforced plastic (fiberglass).

Hand shovel blades made of sheet steel usually have a folded seam or hem at the back to make a socket for the handle. This fold also commonly provides extra rigidity to the blade. The handles are usually riveted in place. A T-piece is commonly fitted to the end of the handle to aid grip and control where the shovel is designed for moving soil and heavy materials. These designs can all be easily mass-produced.

The term shovel also applies to larger excavating machines called power shovels, which serve the same purpose—digging, lifting, and moving material. Although such modern shovels as front-end loaders and excavators (including tractors that feature a loading bucket on one end and a backhoe for digging and placing material on the other) descend from steam shovels and perform similar work, they are not classified as shovels.

Hand shovels have been adapted for many different tasks and environments. They can be optimized for a single task or designed as cross-over or compromise multitaskers. They are commonly used in agriculture.

It is also utilized in archaeology to locate and excavate all subsurface dirt.

== History ==
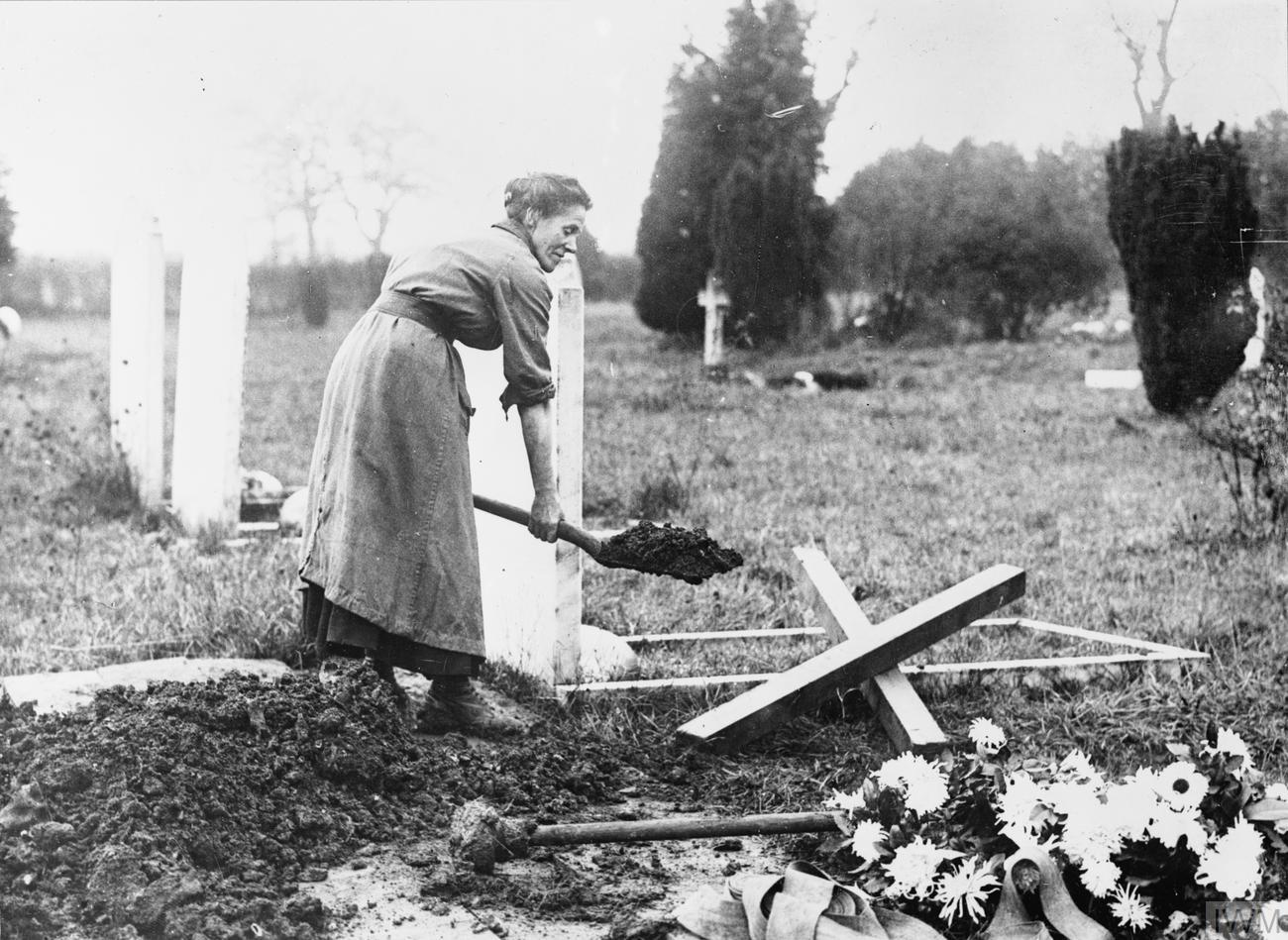
A gravedigger using a shovel, 1918

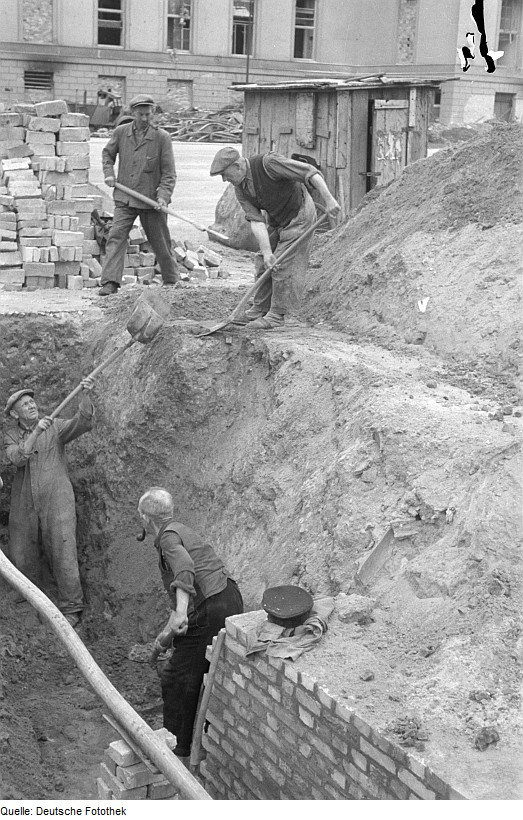
Workmen using shovels

In the Neolithic age and earlier, a large animal's scapula (shoulder blade) was often used as a crude shovel or spade. Shovels at this time were often used for farming.

The later invention of purpose-built shovels was a ground-breaking development. Manual shoveling, often in combination with picking, was the chief means of excavation in construction until mechanization via steam shovels and later hydraulic equipment (excavators such as backhoes and loaders) gradually replaced most manual shoveling. The same is also true of the history of mining and quarrying and of bulk materials handling in industries such as steelmaking and stevedoring. Railroad cars and cargo holds containing ore, coal, gravel, sand, or grains were often loaded and unloaded this way. These industries did not always rely exclusively on such work, but such work was a ubiquitous part of them. Until the 1950s, manual shoveling employed large numbers of workers. Groups of workers called 'labor gangs' were assigned to whatever digging or bulk materials handling was needed in any given week, and dozens or hundreds of workers with hand shovels would do the kind of rapid excavating or materials handling that today is usually accomplished with powered excavators and loaders operated by a few skilled operators. Thus the cost of labor, even when each individual worker was poorly paid, was a tremendous expense of operations. Productivity of the business was tied mostly to labor productivity. It still often is even today; but in the past it was even more so. In industrial and commercial materials handling, hand shoveling was later replaced with loaders and backhoes.

Given the central importance and cost of manual labour in industry in the late 19th and early 20th centuries, the "science of shoveling" was something of great interest to developers of scientific management such as Frederick Winslow Taylor. Taylor, with his focus on time and motion study, took an interest in differentiating the many motions of manual labor to a far greater degree than others tended to. Managers might not care to analyze it (possibly motivated by the assumption that manual labor is intellectually simple work), and workers might not care to analyze it in any way that encouraged management to take away the prerogative in craft work for the craftsman to decide the details of his methods. Taylor realized that failing to analyze shoveling practice represented a missed opportunity to discover or synthesize best practices for shoveling, which could achieve highest productivity (value for dollar spent). It was Taylor and colleagues in the 1890s through 1910s that greatly expanded the existing idea of varied shovel designs with different-sized scoops, one for each material, based on the material's density. Under scientific management, it was no longer acceptable to use the same shovel for shoveling brown coal one day and gravel the next. Taylor said the increased worker productivity, and corresponding savings in wages paid, would offset the capital cost of maintaining two shovels.

During the Second Industrial Revolution around 1900, heavy equipment such as crawler excavators became available.

Shovels known as entrenching tools were made by the British in 1908. They were used by the Germans in World War I and World War II.

== Types ==
| Image | Name (and synonyms if any) | Description |
|---|---|---|
| | coal shovel | Typically has a wide, flat blade with steeply turned sides, a flat face and a short D-shaped handle. Over the years, various sizes for different kinds or grades of coal have sometimes been used. |
| | snow shovel | Often has a very wide sideless blade that curves upward attached to a short handle with a D-shaped grip. A variety of styles are available. Some are designed mostly for pushing the snow, others for lifting it. The blade can be metal or plastic. |
| | snow sled shovel snow scoop sleigh shovel | large and deep hopper-like implement fitted with a wide loop handle and designed to scoop up a load of snow and slide it away without lifting. |
| | grain shovel barn shovel | Has a large, wide aluminium or plastic blade attached to a short hardwood handle with D-shaped grip. Made to move large quantities of loose light material. Early models were made entirely from wood, typically a single piece. |
| | spoon shovel | A long handle with a small, oval, cupped, inclined blade at the end, used in excavating deep, narrow holes or removing material from a lower elevation, as from a tank. Its name comes from its resemblance to a spoon. |
| | roofing shovel | A specialized prying tool that evolved from use of spading forks and pitchforks to remove old roof shingles and underlayment as part of roof repair. |
| | square shovel | A general category of shovel that includes many types with a generally square outline (rather than being pointed like many spades are). |
| | scoop | A general category of shovel that includes many types with a generally dished or cupped shape, and typically a fairly square edge, tailored to scooping up loose materials. |
| | drain spade sharpshooter trenching shovel trenching spade | Generally a long thin blade with pronounced upturned side flanges. Used for digging trenches. |

== See also ==
- Entrenching tool
- Dustpan

== General bibliography ==
- Taylor, Frederick Winslow (1911), The Principles of Scientific Management, New York and London: Harper & Brothers, LCCN 11010339, OCLC 233134.
