= Turk's head brush =

Cleaning tool

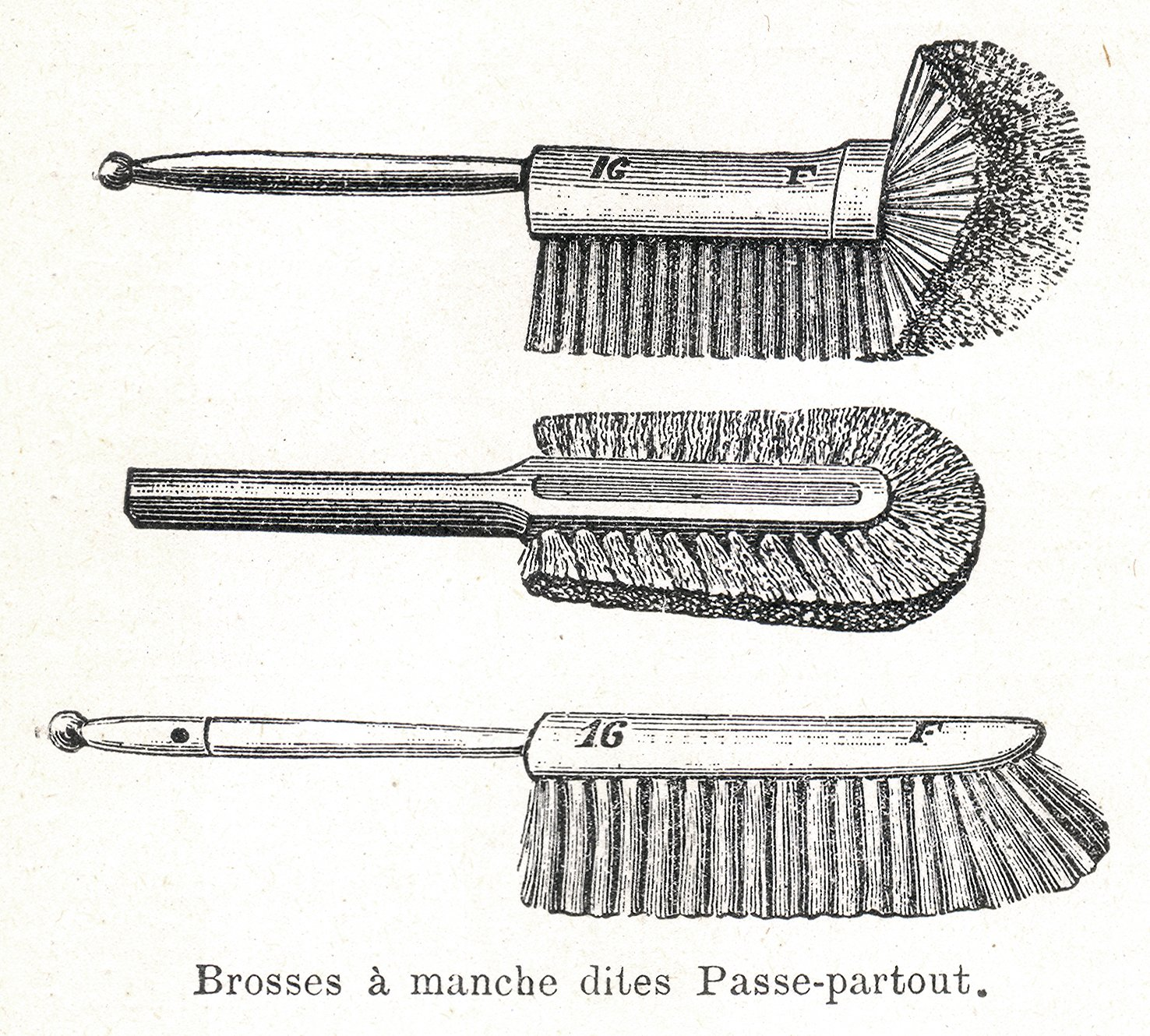
The "Turk's head" brush design (top) prevents the stem coming into contact with the surface being cleaned.

A Turk's head brush is a type of cleaning brush where the bristles are arranged covering the end of the stem as a half-sphere, so that the end of the stem does not come into direct contact with the surface being cleaned, especially when cleaning the inside of a cylindrical object. A larger type, mounted on a long stem and used for removing cobwebs, is called a "Turk's head broom". The name has long been in use for this type of brush, so named because its cleaning end resembles a "wild" head of hair. Turk's head brushes and brooms are used for domestic purposes, for cleaning artillery, for pharmaceutical use, for sweeping chimneys, and for other purposes.

== Controversy ==
Some types of toilet bowl brushes with this design are referred to by resellers by the name "Turk's head toilet bowl brush". The Turkish American Legal Defense Fund have argued that this name is derogatory and insulting to Turkish Americans. In response, Newell Rubbermaid, the recipient of TALDF's complaint, stated that the company itself does not use this name in any of its product advertising. However, the name is still used by resellers.

== See also ==
- Anti-Turkism
- Turk's head knot
