= Soap shaker =

Washing implement

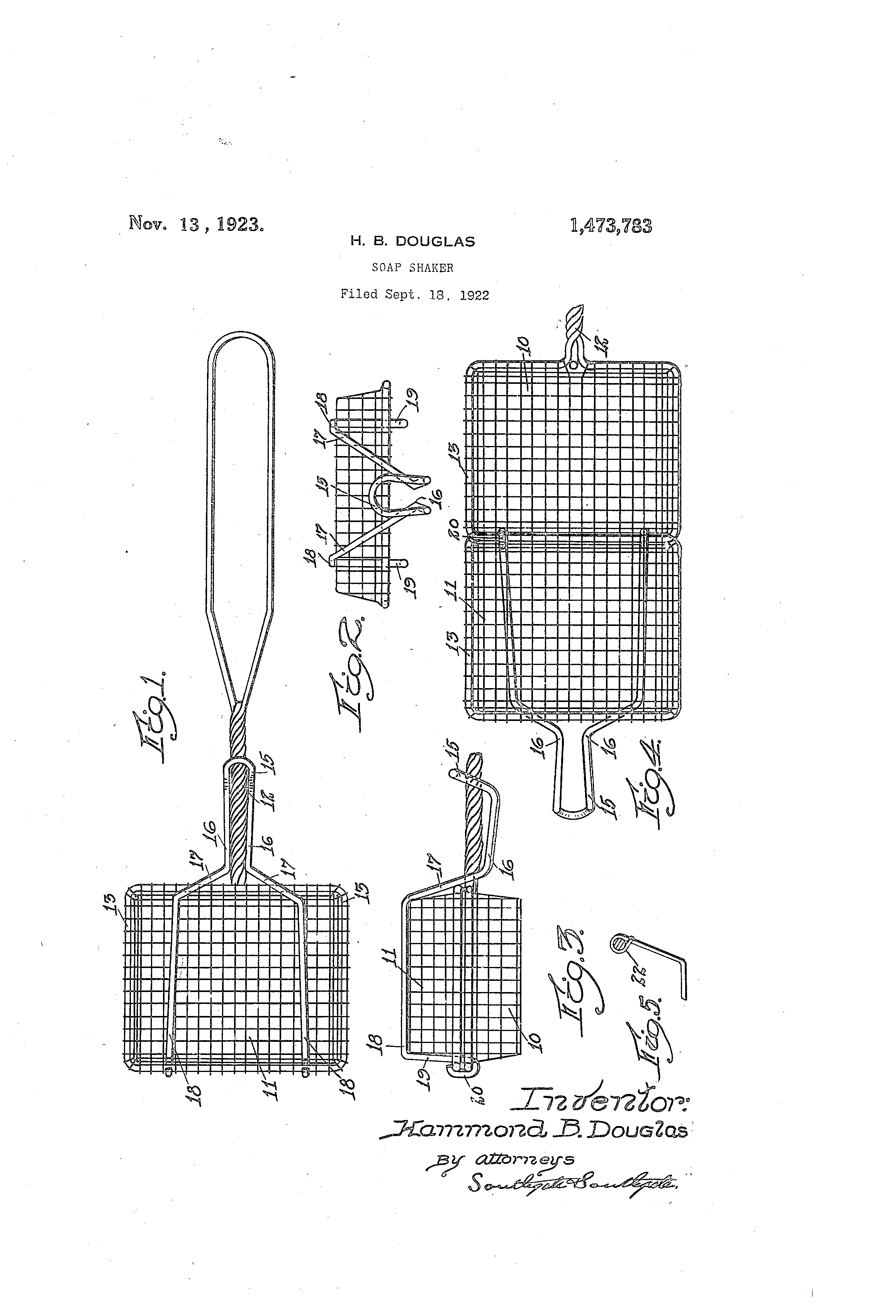
Soap shaker, drawing as part of its granted patent

A soap shaker is a wire metal mesh box with a handle. The box may be opened so as to be able to place pieces of bar soap inside, including fragments that have become too small to be used as hand soap.

The box may now be securely closed. Held by its handle the box may be vigorously shaken in a water filled bucket or other container. The shaking will move the water through the box. The result is that the water will become soapy, rich with suds to be used for cleaning purposes. This way even small pieces of bar soap could be re-used and are not wasted.

The use of a soap shaker was common early to mid 20th century. The invention and sale of powdered or liquid soap diminished its use.
