= Peg wood =

Watch cleaning tool

A peg wood (also pegwood) is a cleaning tool used in watchmaking to clean pivots and other small holes. Pegwood is made from a specially selected orangewood that has been dried and sheds very little. A peg wood consists of a thin piece or dowel of wood that the user shapes to be pointed. The standard length is 150 mm and the thickness varies from 2 to 6 mm.

They are also used to clean watch case backs and watch case rims, to dry hands and to clean between bracelet rings which might gather grease and dust when worn over a long period. The point is twirled around the hole to be cleaned to remove dirt. A new point is cut and the operation is repeated until the peg wood is clean when removed from the hole.
