= Soot blower =

Removes soot deposits inside a boiler

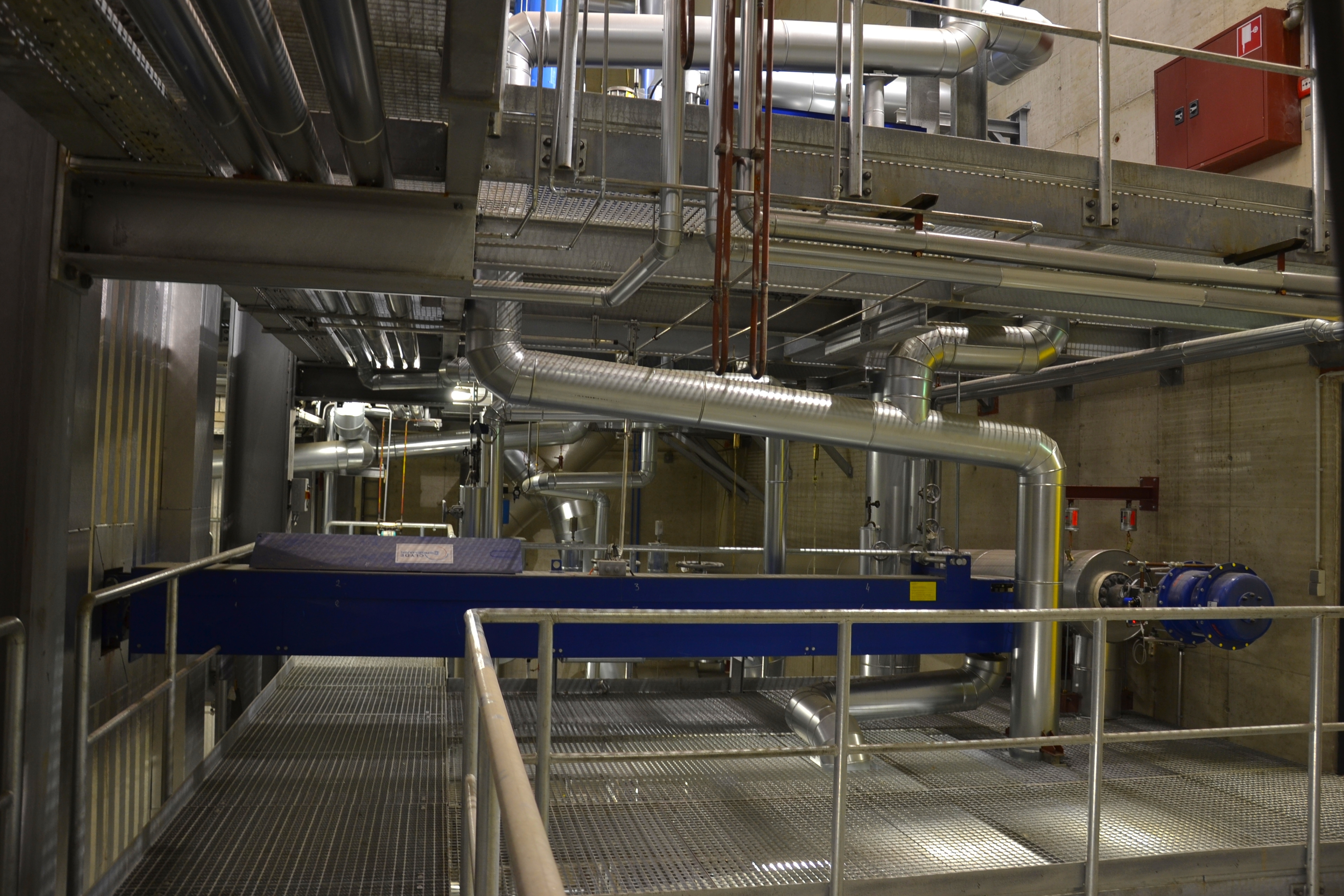
Long Retractable Sootblower utilizing steam as a cleaning medium.

A sootblower is a device for removing the soot that is deposited on the internal furnace tubes of a boiler during combustion to prevent plugging of the gas passes and maintain boiler efficiency. The world market leader is Clyde Bergemann Power Group.

Types of soot blowers:

1. Wall Blowers also known as IRs (Insertable Rotating)
2. Long Retractable Sootblower (LRSB) or IK (Insertable Kinetic)
3. Part-Retractable Sootblowers
4. Oscillating Sootblowers
5. Rake Sootblowers
6. Air Heater Blower
7. Rotating Element Sootblowers
8. Multi-Media Sootblowers
9. Fixed Rotating

Steam blowing medium:

- Steam
- Air
- High Pressure Water
- Dual-media air heater

Steam is normally used as a medium for blowing away the soot since capital cost of steam pressure reducing equipment and drain is less than the cost of compressors, motors and control of air systems.

== Benefits of Sootblowers ==
- Increased plant availability
- Improved boiler and fired heater efficiency
- Controlled deposit build-up
- Reduced CO_{2} emissions
- Steam savings
- Optimised combustion process
- Increased energy recovery effectiveness
- Flexible operation for changing fuel mixture and varying fuel quality

== Problems caused by soot ==
=== Reduced efficiency ===
Soot deposited on the heating surfaces of a boiler acts as a heat insulator. The result is that less heat is transferred to the water to raise steam and more heat is wasted up the chimney. This leads to higher fuel consumption and/or poor steaming.

=== Soot fires ===
A soot fire can be damaging to a boiler because it can cause localized hotspots to occur in the tubes. These hotspots may reach temperatures that weaken the materials of the tubes. Sootblowers reduce the risk of soot fires and their resulting damage.

== Operation ==
A sootblower may be operated manually or by a remotely controlled motor. The soot, which is removed from the heating surfaces, will be blown out with the flue gases. If the boiler is equipped with a dust collector, it will trap the soot. Otherwise, the soot will be ejected into the outside air through the chimney stack.

== Industries ==
A sootblower can make an important contribution for an optimised, more efficient and low-emission operation supporting clean energy generation in many industries, including:

- Power Industry
- Petrochemical Industry
- Waste-to Energy Plants
- Biomass Plants
- Marine
- Other Industrial Processes
