= Vacuum blasting =

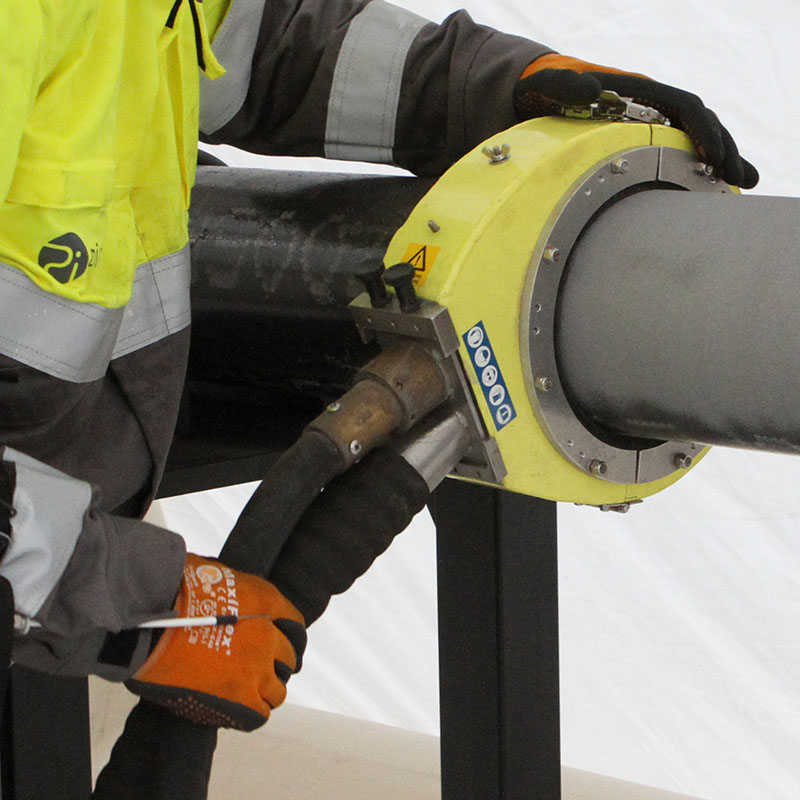
Example of tool used for vacuum blasting of pipes.

Vacuum blasting is an abrasive blasting method, also referred to as dustless blasting or closed loop abrasive blasting. The method is characterized by a blast tool that does abrasive blasting and collects both used blast media, and loosened particles from the surface to be treated, simultaneously.

== Procedure ==
The blast tool is equipped with a blast hose and a suction hose, that both run from the blast tool to a control unit. The control unit supplies the blast tool with pressurized air mixed with blast media, and sucks back dust, loosened particles and used blast media.

The control unit continuously separates dust and loosened particles from the used blast media, and sends used blast media back into the pressurized air flow. The dust and loosened particles are collected in a waste container.

== Applications ==
The method is typically used in areas where dust and spill from regular abrasive blasting is not wanted, for example due to HSE-considerations. The blast process itself is slower than regular abrasive blasting, but requires less sheeting and scaffolding
