= Wire brush =

Tool

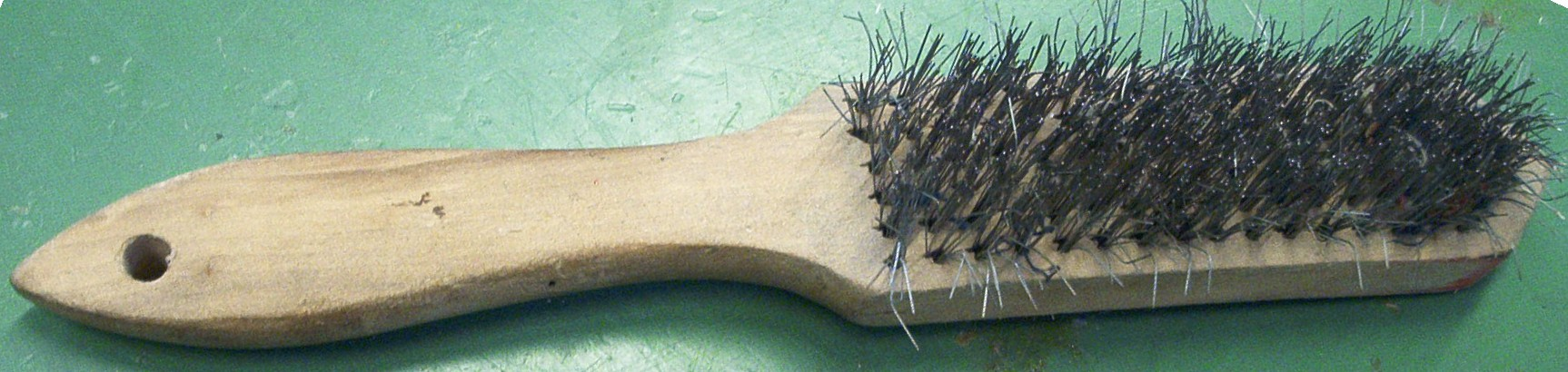
Wire brush

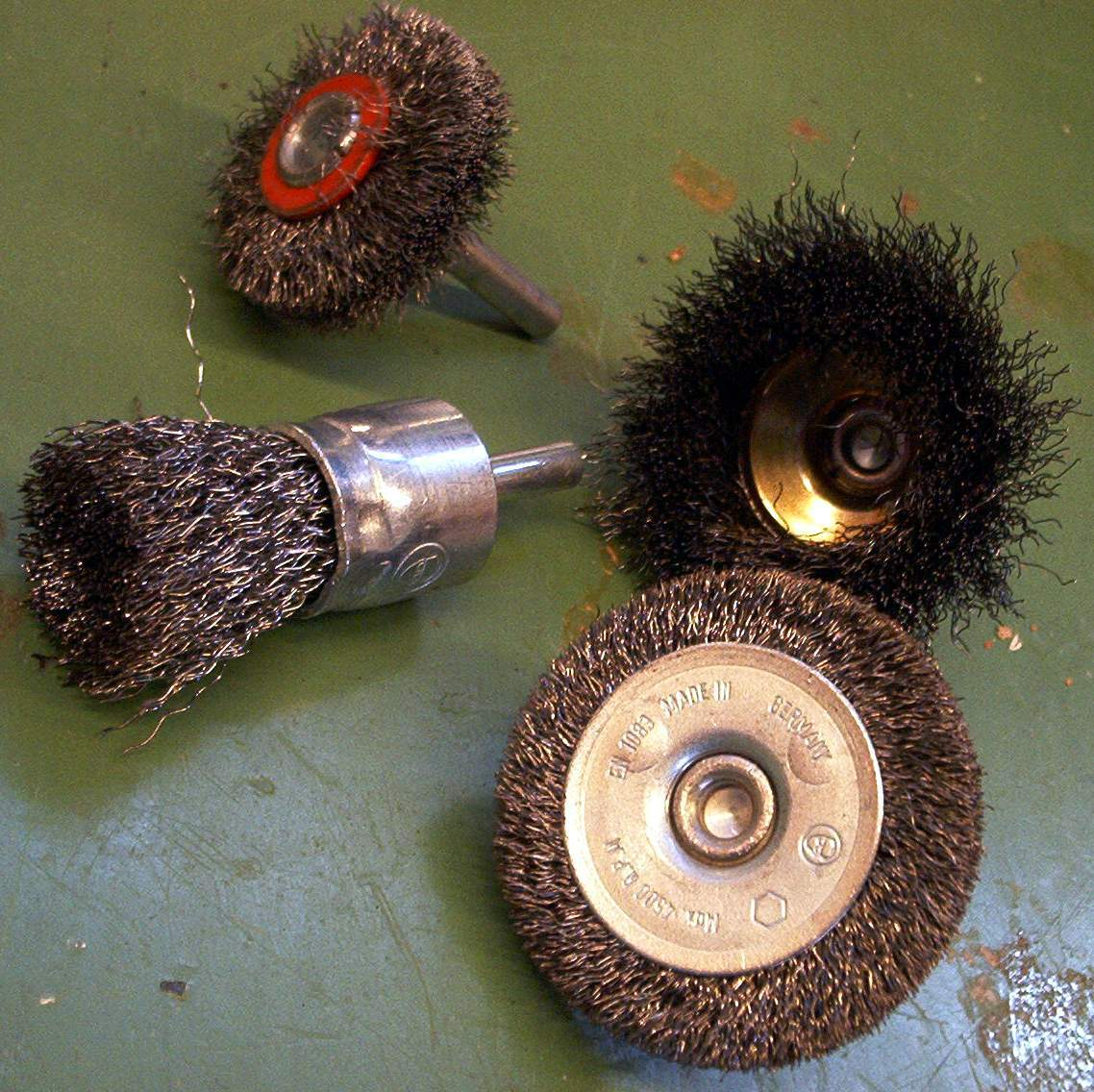
Round wire brushes

A wire brush is a tool consisting of a brush whose bristles are made of wire, most often steel wire. The steel used is generally a medium- to high-carbon variety and very hard and springy. Other wire brushes feature bristles made from brass or stainless steel, depending on application. Wires in a wire brush can be held together by epoxy, staples, or other binding. Wire brushes usually either have a handle of wood or plastic (for handheld use) or are formed into a wheel for use on angle grinders, bench grinders, pistol-grip drill motors, or other power tools.

== Uses ==
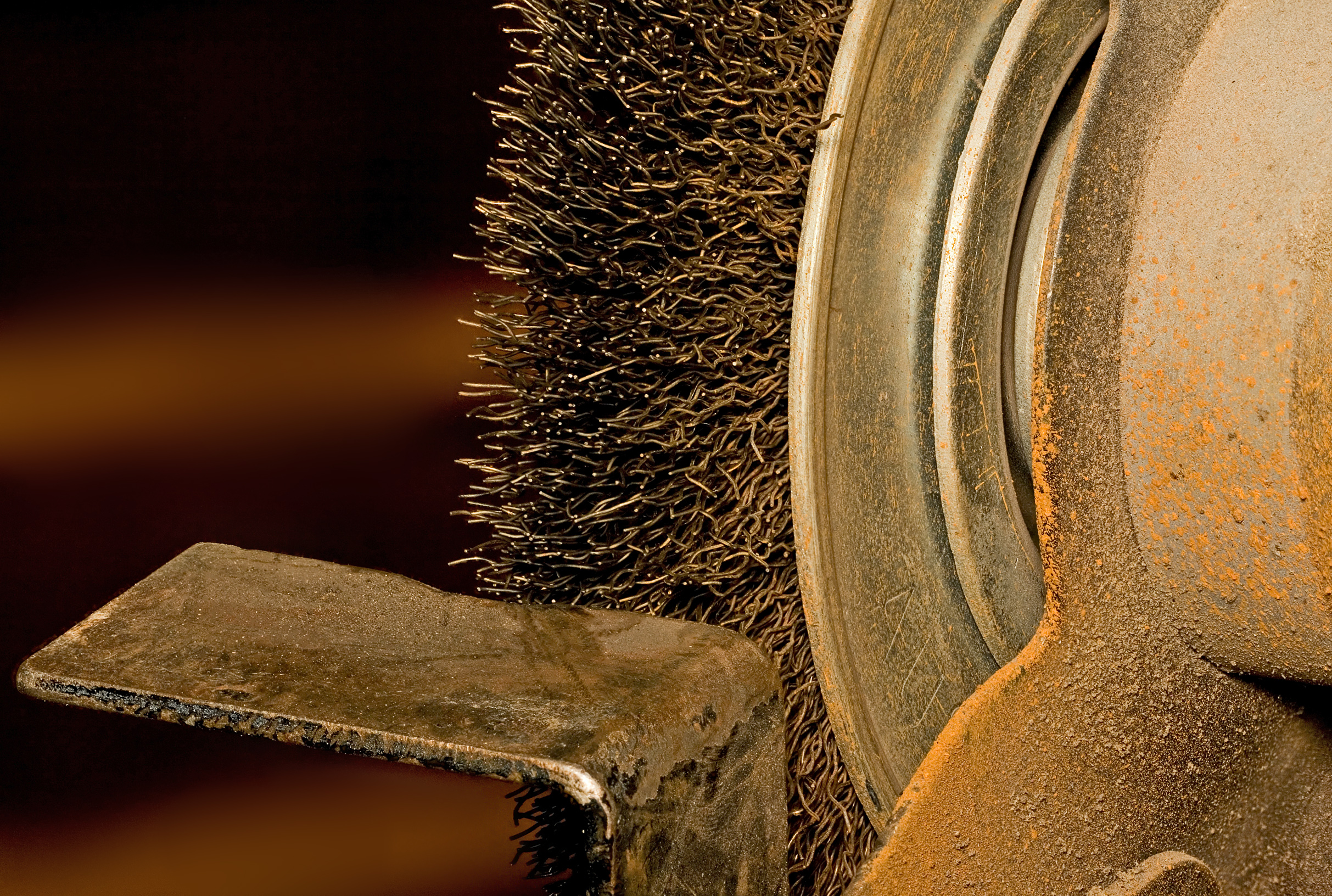
8 in (203 mm) wire brush mounted to a bench grinder

The wire brush is primarily an abrasive implement, used for cleaning rust and removing paint. It is also used to clean surfaces and to create a better conductive area for attaching electrical connections, such as those between car battery posts and their connectors, should they accumulate a build-up of grime and dirt. When cleaning stainless steel, it is advisable to use a stainless steel bristle wire brush, as a plain carbon steel brush can contaminate the stainless steel and cause rust spots to appear. Brass bristle brushes are used on softer surfaces or when it is necessary to clean a harder surface without marring it. Brass bristle brushes are also used in potentially flammable environments where non-sparking tools are required. Wire brushes are also used to clean the teeth of large animals, such as crocodiles and pigs. They are also used widely in surface engineering to clean the castings prior to painting.

== History ==
The origins of the wire brush are unknown, although it is believed that the Romans used similar tools in the manufacture of roof tiles. As the Roman Empire fell, the tool fell out of use.

== Barbeque grill cleaning ==
A number of surgeons recommend that wire brushes not be used to clean barbecue grills. In some cases, bristles break off the brush which then become deposited in food cooked on the grill. Ingestion of these bristles can cause gastrointestinal perforation.

On May 20, 2020, American food writer and grilling authority Derrick Riches called for a ban on the manufacture and sale of wire-bristle grill-cleaning brushes.

== See also ==
- Bristle blasting
- Metalworking hand tool
- Wire wheel
