= Silent butler =

Metal container for collecting ashes or crumbs

A silent butler, sometimes called an ash butler, is a small container, often of base metal, sometimes silver or silverplate, with a handle and hinged cover, used for collecting ashes or crumbs. They were more common during the 20th century, and enjoyed some popularity being made as a home construction project in the US. They are now often considered collector's items, or are valued for their retro appeal.

== See also ==
- Tableware
