= Wash rack =

American term for an area for washing vehicles

A wash rack is a partly enclosed platform that is used to wash vehicles, heavy equipment, tools, and parts by removing dirt, grime, chemicals, invasive species, and other contaminants with a pressure washer in order to prevent corrosion and promote longer equipment lifespan. Cars, trucks, boats, construction and maintenance equipment, and even aircraft and military vehicles can all be cleaned in a wash rack. Wash racks are usually mobile and constructed from steel, although plastic wash racks exist as well as concrete formed alternatives which are sometimes installed in permanent facilities.

== Overview ==
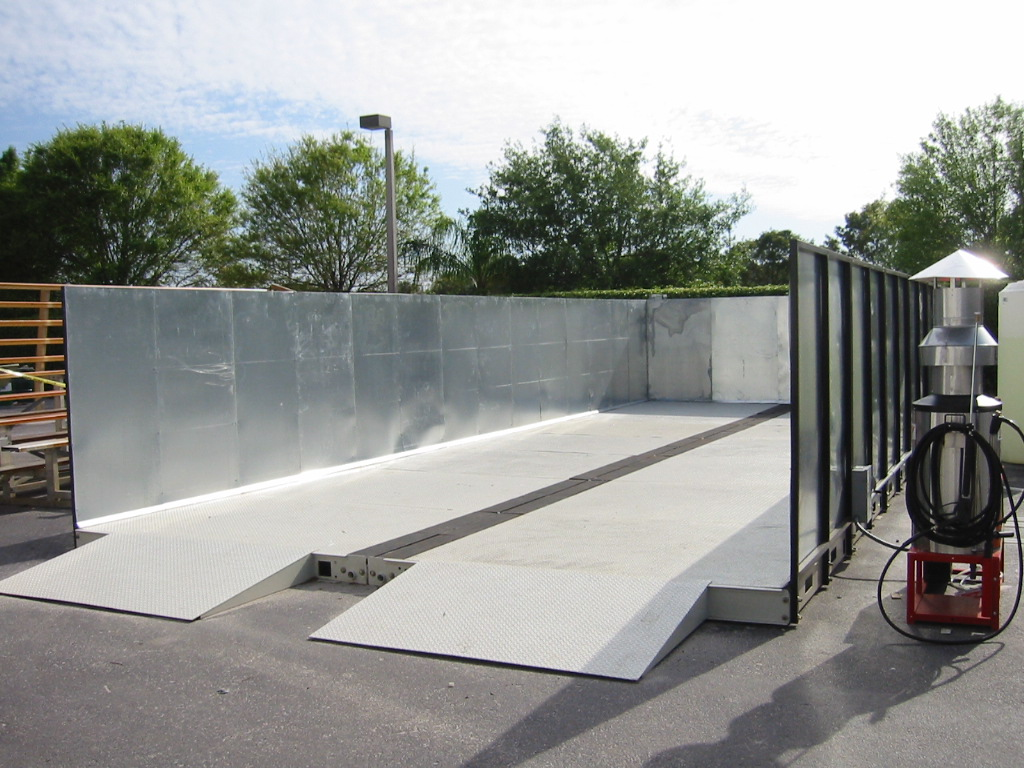
This wash rack was installed in West Palm Beach, Florida as a part of the city's Sustainability Action Plan in 2007 in order to provide a compliant wash area where they could clean their vehicles.

The term wash rack is also used to describe pads for washing horses. Wash racks for vehicle washing may be called closed-loop washing systems, heavy duty wash systems and degreasing pads.

Wash racks are often called "containment racks" or "containment pads" because their purpose is to contain effluent which often consists of hazardous materials that have been dislodged from the wash subject, and prevent it from draining off into the ground and causing stormwater contamination. Instead, the waste water is pumped out of the wash rack and into some sort of filtration system which removes the contaminants then sends the water either back into the pressure washer for reuse or into a sanitary sewer.

== Purpose ==
The main purpose of a wash rack is to clean equipment while protecting the environment from contaminants commonly found on construction, maintenance and military vehicles or equipment. To comply with U.S. Department of Agriculture (USDA) regulations, which are intended to prevent soil-borne insects or other potentially harmful organisms from entering the United States, U.S. military vehicles and equipment must be thoroughly washed before being shipped home. As such, wash racks are commonly used by the US military to ensure vehicles are clean and safe before they are brought back into the country.

According to statistics, wash racks help recycle thousands of gallons of water on a daily basis and are already part of many military construction projects around the world. Industrial water use was estimated at 18.5 billion gallons per day in the United States in 2005, a number that could be greatly reduced by using wash racks to recycle and reuse water.

According to the United States Department of Agriculture, wash racks are also important in controlling the spread of noxious weeds and invasive species in the agricultural industry, as well as forestry.
