= Feather duster =

Duster made out of animal feathers

A feather duster is a cleaning tool that is typically made from a wooden dowel handle onto which feathers are wound with a wire. The feathers are most often 14 to 32 inches (36 to 81 cm) long. Some dusters have a retractable casing instead of a dowel handle and these are typically used by rack-jobbers and truck drivers who need to clean store shelves, and can retract the feathers into the handle to avoid damage.

Feather dusters serve the same function as soft brooms or brushes, except that they are only meant to remove loose superficial dust from delicate surfaces (such as paintings and papercrafts) or around fragile items (such as porcelain and glassware). They are effective in cleaning tight areas, or areas where there are many odds and ends. The individual feathers are flexible and can reach into gaps and crevices without disturbing the surrounding, and the tiny barbules on the feathers themselves that act as "fingers" to collect and remove dust particles.

== History ==
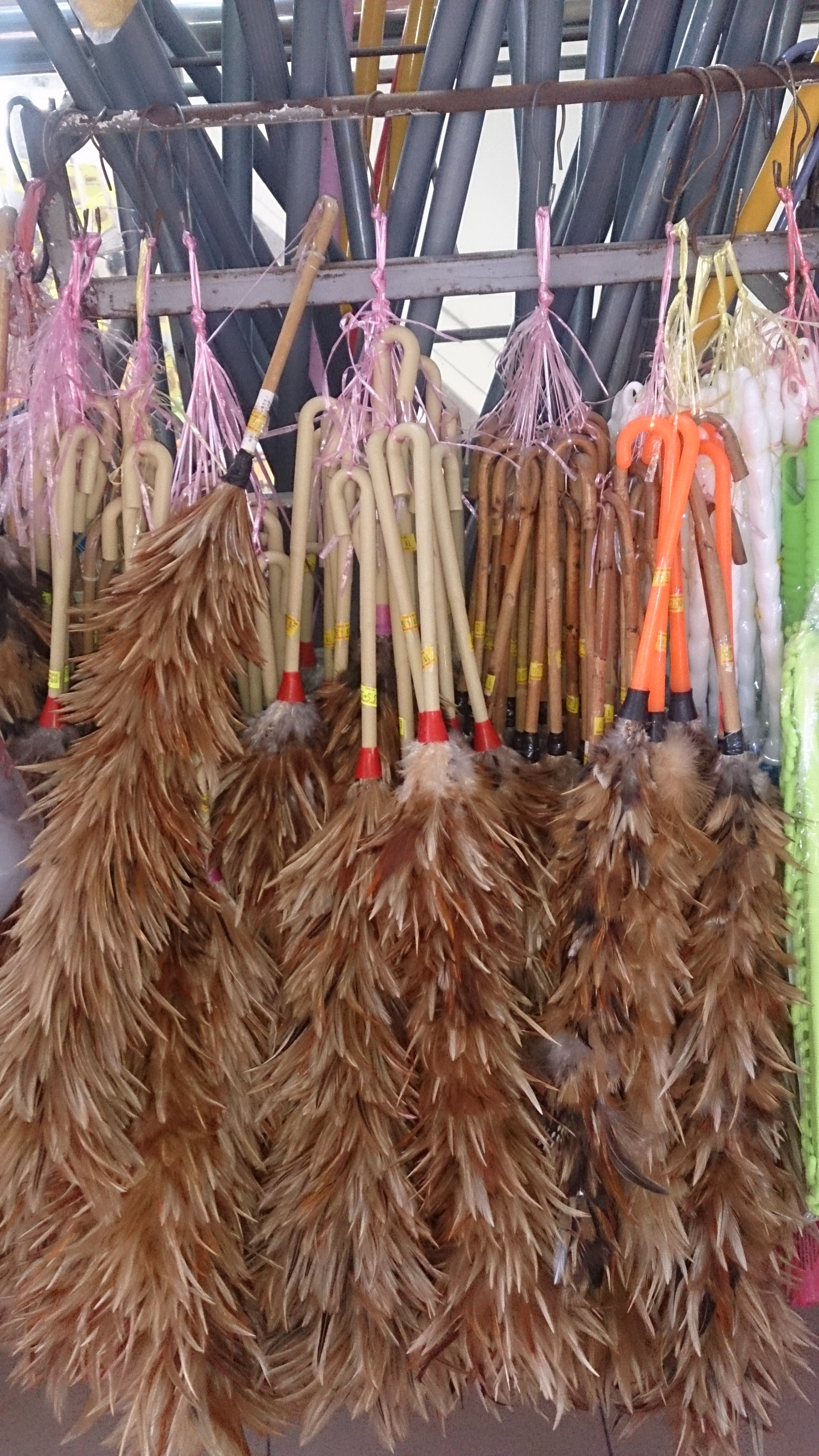
A common Asian feather duster made of chicken feathers attached to a bamboo stick

The first recorded use of the phrase "feather duster" in the Oxford English Dictionary is dated to 1801, but likely referred to a light brush made out of feathers.

One possible origin story for the modern form of the feather duster having a long handle and long feathers is as follows. In 1870 a farmer brought a bundle of turkey feathers into a broom factory in Jones County, Iowa, asking if they could be used to assemble a brush. E. E. Hoag split them with a pocket knife and mounted them on a short broomstick. But the result was too stiff for use. In 1874, the Hoag Duster Company was founded in Iowa.

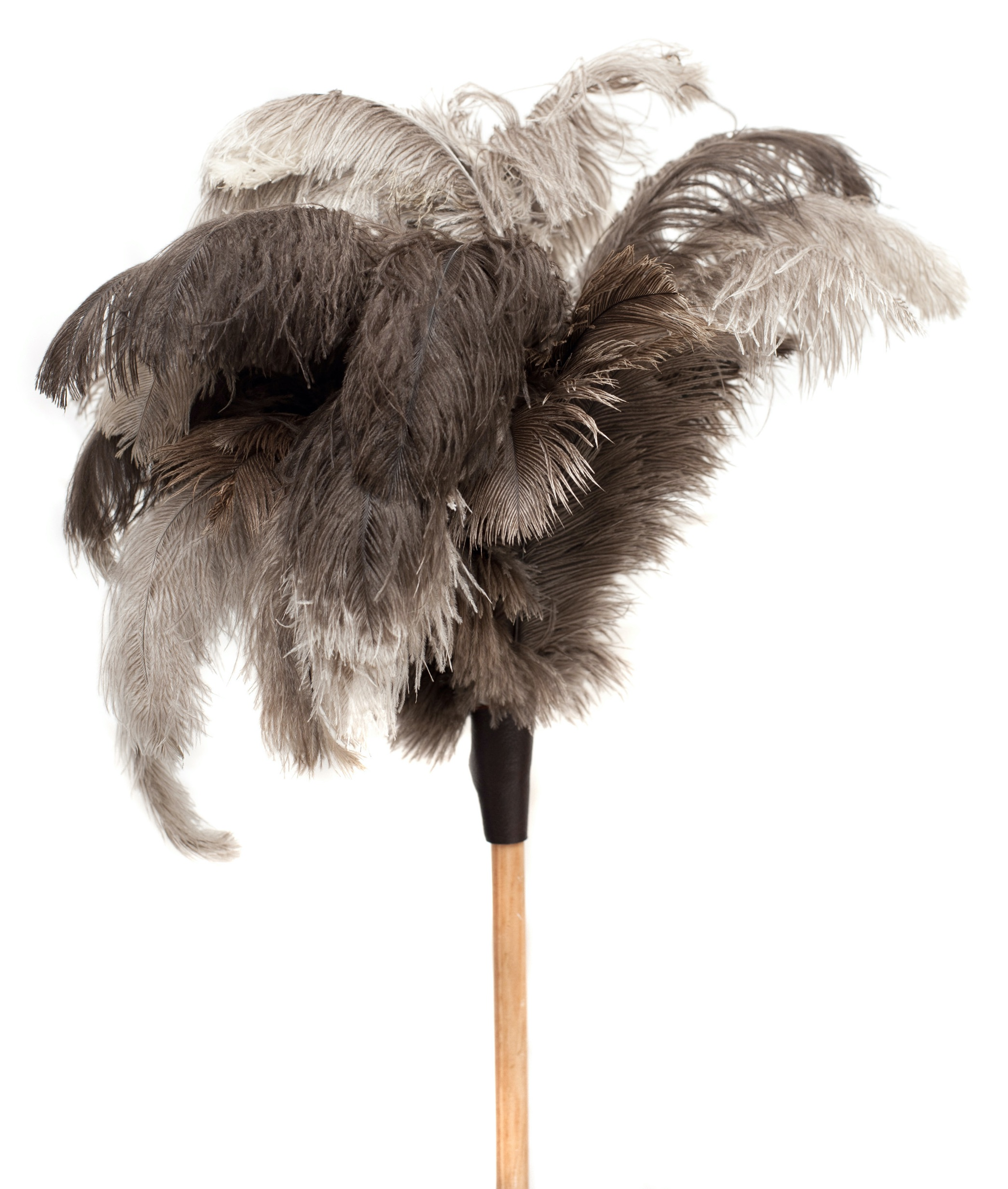
Picture showing the design of Beatrice Elenora’s 1876 feather duster.

In 1874, Beatrice Elenora of Geneva Lake, Wisconsin, U.S., used discarded turkey feathers in a feather duster. Elenora filed a patent (U.S. patent #177,939) on November 13, 1874 which was issued on May 30, 1876. After a hard-fought legal battle against her husband George, and the National Feather Duster Company in December 1881, the United States Court of Appeals for the Seventh Circuit in Chicago ruled in favor of Beatrice giving her priority of invention of the feather duster.

The Chicago Feather Duster Company was established in 1875. It received a patent for cuff on December 22, 1906, and for the head on September 17, 1907.

South African ostrich feather dusters were developed in Johannesburg in 1903 by Harry S. Beckner, a missionary and broom factory manager. He felt that ostrich feathers made a convenient tool for cleaning machines at the factory. His first ostrich feather dusters were wound on broom handles using the same foot-powered kick winders and wire used to attach broom straw.

The first ostrich feather duster company in the United States was formed in 1913 by brothers Harry and George Beckner in Athol, Massachusetts and is now run by George's great granddaughter, Margret Fish Rempher.

The largest manufacturer of ostrich feather dusters is Klein Karoo International (Feathers) in Oudtshoorn, South Africa.

== Types ==
There are several types of feathers used in feather dusters, but ostrich feathers are most often used.

Black ostrich feathers come from the male and are very soft with feathers that are more "stringy" in nature. Gray ostrich feathers are more stark than the black feathers and are often sold at grocery stores. Floss ostrich feathers are the most soft and delicate feathers and come from underneath the bird's wings. Floss ostrich feathers are more expensive. Chick feathers are more pointed and stark than ostrich feathers, are usually sold at very low prices.

In Indonesia and Thailand, feather dusters are normally made of chicken feathers. They are attached to a length of bamboo, and feathers are commonly present along most of the stick.

In popular culture, feather dusters are also well-known in Asia to be used as means of corporal punishment for young children.
