= Cleaner =

Person who cleans

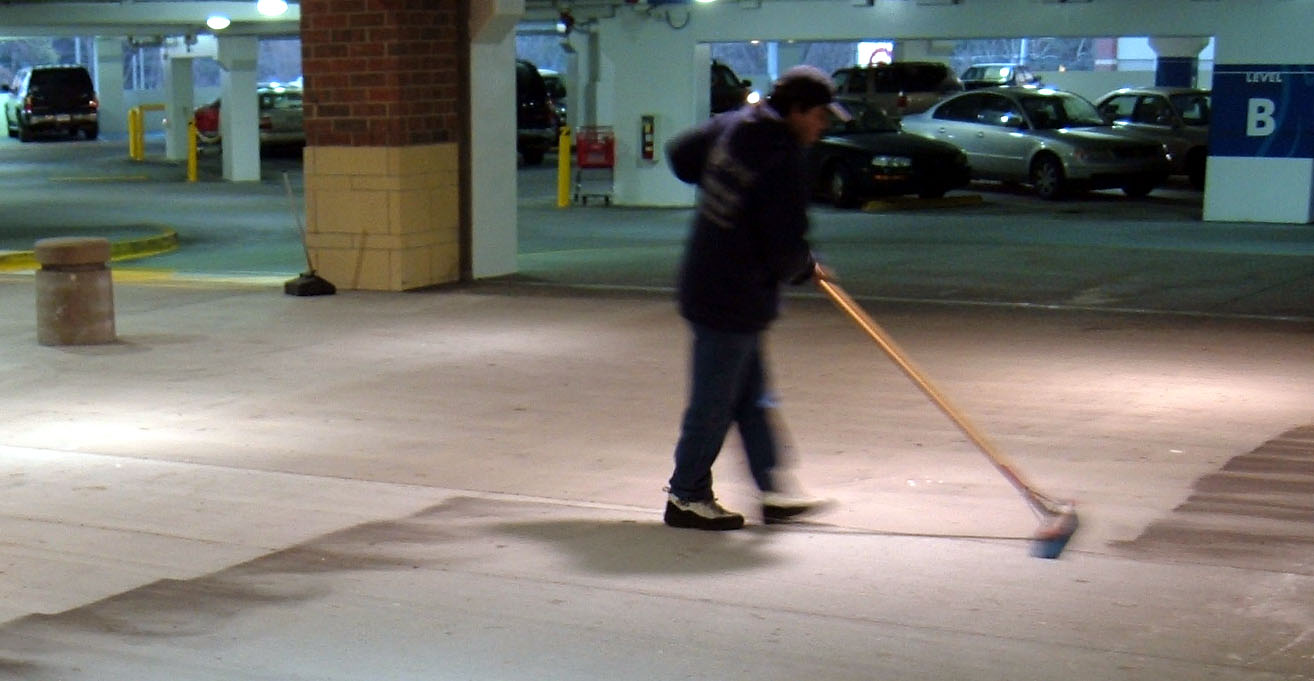
A cleaner sweeping the floor of a parking garage in Atlanta, Georgia.

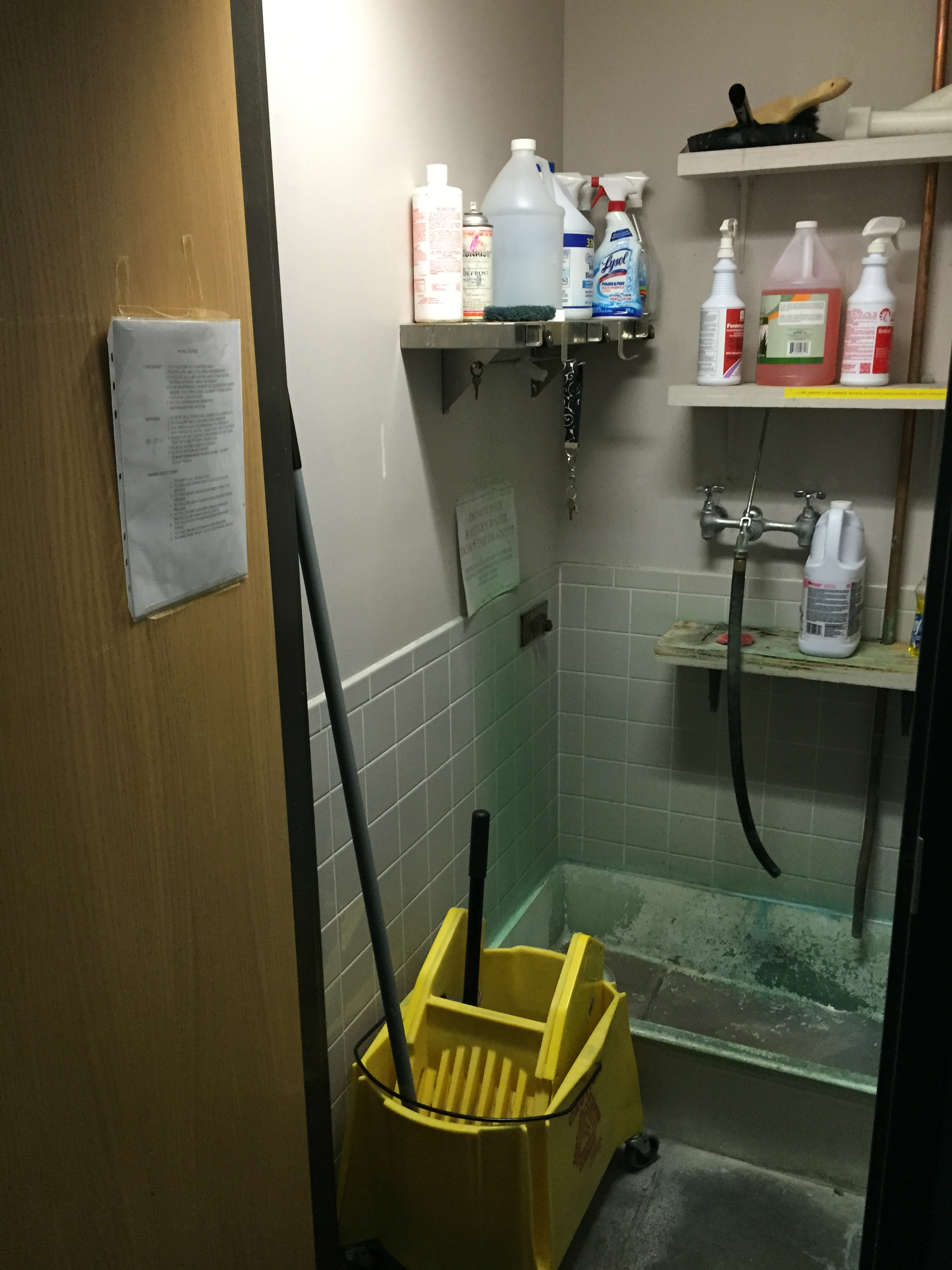
Janitorial closet in Elko, Nevada, United States

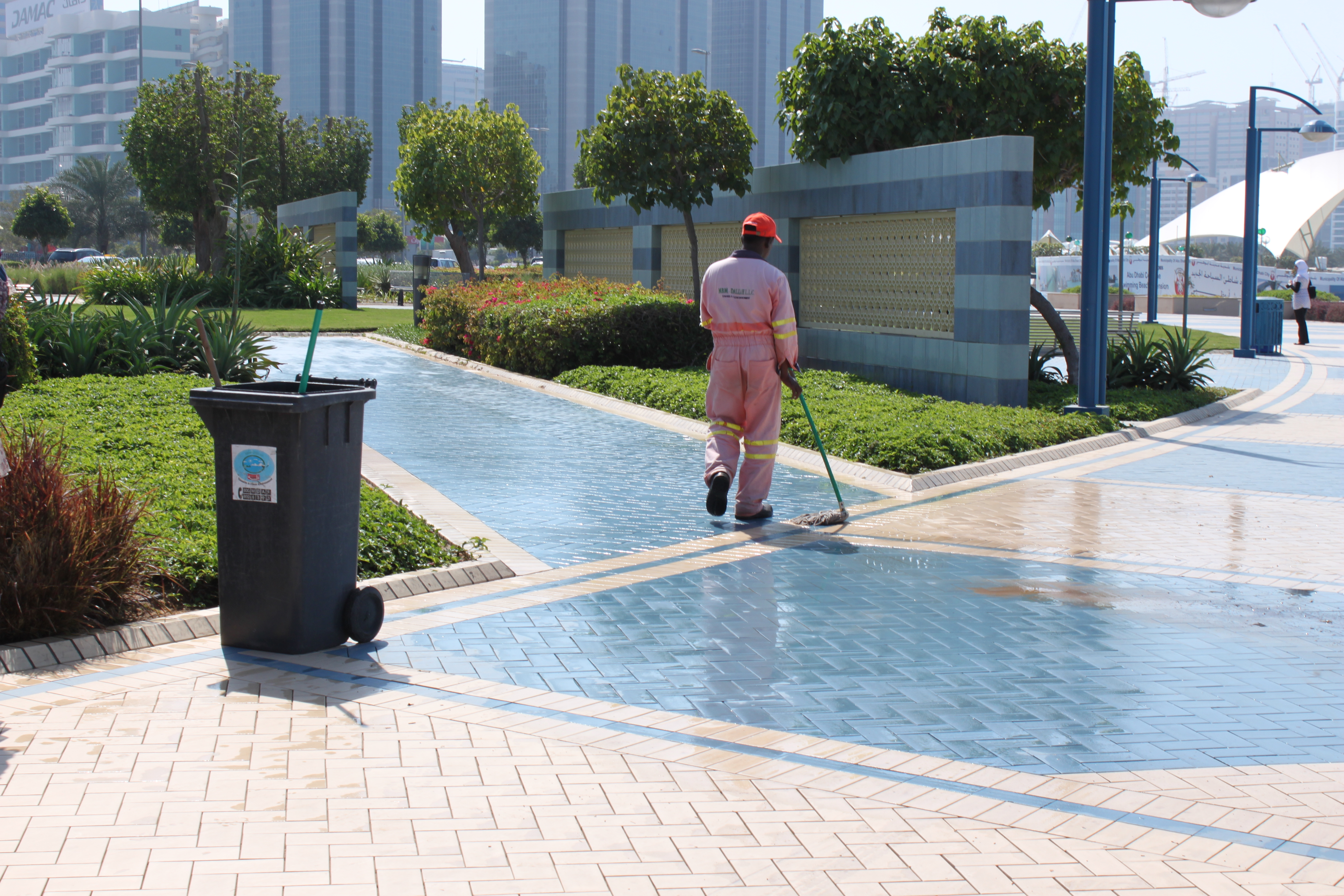
Cleaner cleaning the footpath in Abu Dhabi, UAE.

A cleaner, cleanser or cleaning operative is a type of industrial or domestic worker who is tasked with cleaning a space. A janitor (Scotland, United States and Canada), also known as a custodian, Facility Operator, porter or caretaker, is a person who cleans and might also carry out maintenance and security duties. A similar position, but usually with more managerial duties and not including cleaning, is occupied by building superintendents in the United States and Canada and by site managers in schools in the United Kingdom.

According to the Cambridge English dictionary a "cleaner" is "a person whose job is to clean houses, offices, public places, etc."; the Collins dictionary states that: "A cleaner is someone who is employed to clean the rooms and furniture inside a building." However, a cleaner does not always have to be employed and perform work for pay, such as in the case of volunteer work or community service. "Cleaner" may also refer to cleaning agents e.g. oven cleaner, or devices used for cleaning, e.g. vacuum cleaner.

Cleaning operatives may specialize in cleaning particular things or places, such as window cleaners, housekeepers, janitors, crime scene cleaners and so on. Cleaning operatives often work when the people who otherwise occupy the space are not around. They may clean offices at night or houses during the workday.

== Etymology ==
The word janitor derives from the Latin "ianitor", meaning doorkeeper or porter, itself from "ianua", meaning door, entrance or gate. Its first recorded use meaning "caretaker of a building, man employed to see that rooms are kept clean" was in 1708.

== Demography ==
Between 17% and 23% of the total illegal immigrant population living in the United States work in the cleaning industry (and growing at a rate of 1/2% to 1/3% per year). In addition to this population offering an abundant source of inexpensive labor, janitorial work is mostly undertaken at night, making it an appealing option for janitorial companies to employ illegal workers seeking clandestine employment. In the Netherlands, the number of cleaning companies grew from 5,000 in 2003 to 8,000 in 2008.

=== Pay scale ===
According to the U.S. Bureau of Labor Statistics, in 2023 the median pay of a janitor working in the US was $16.84 per hour.

== Outsourcing ==
Cleaning is one of the most commonly outsourced services.

Some of the reasons for this include:

- Basic cleaning tasks are standardised, with little variation among different enterprises.
- The nature of the job and required standard of performance can be clearly defined and specified in a contract, unlike more technical or professional jobs for which such specification is harder to develop.
- Some organizations prefer to outsource work unrelated to their core business in order to save additional salaries and benefits required to manage the work.
- Some organizations may feel uncomfortable dealing with labour relations related to low wage employees; by outsourcing, these labor relations issues are transferred to a contractor whose staff are comfortable and experienced in dealing with these issues, and their approach can benefit from economies of scale.
- If a janitor is unavailable due to sickness or leave, a contractor which employs many janitors can easily assign a substitute. A small organisation which employs one or a few janitors directly will have much more trouble with this.

== Occupation classification: types of cleaning operatives ==
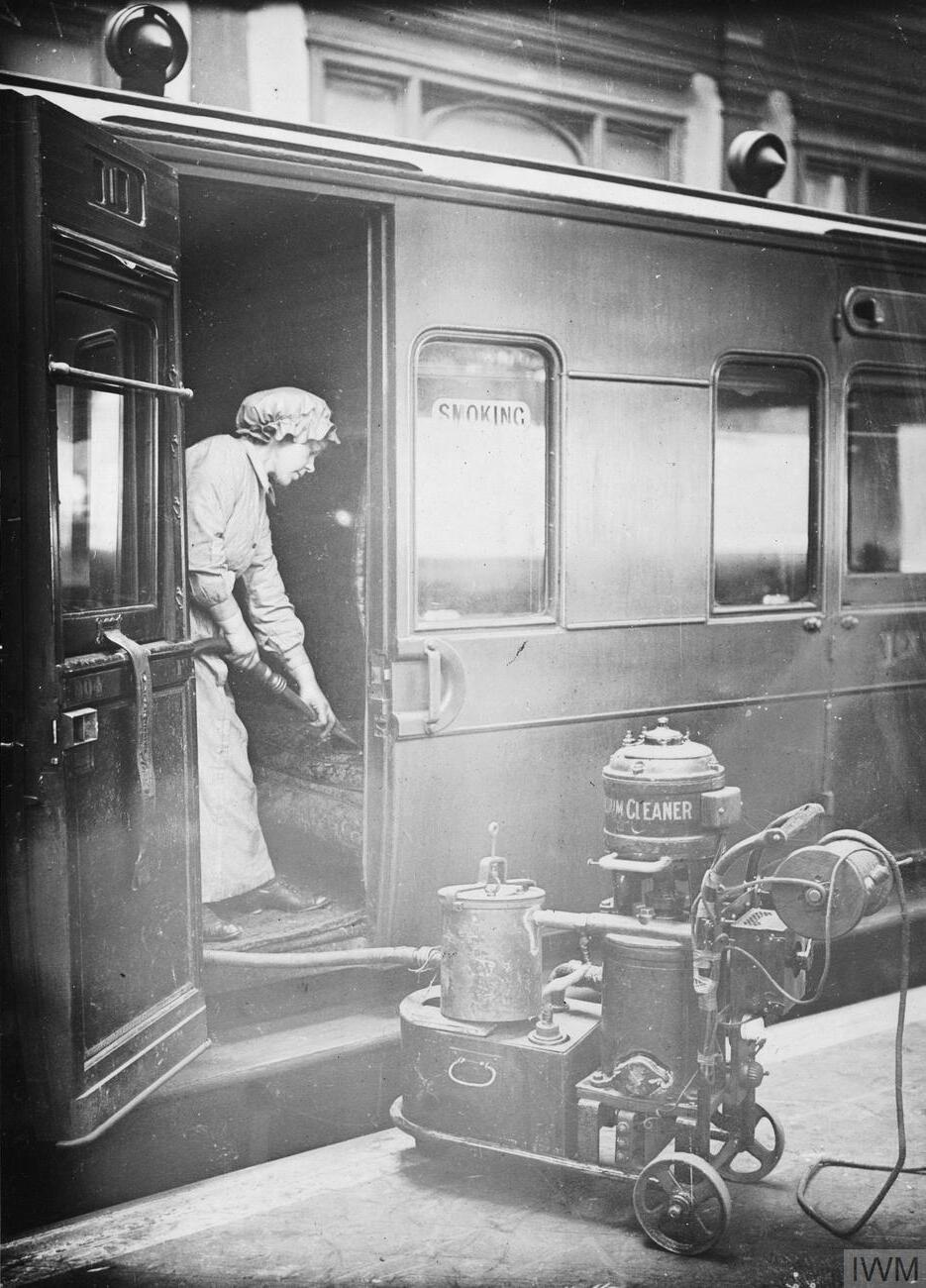
A train cleaner at work in London, 1918

The cleaning industry is quite big as different types of cleaning are required for different objects and different properties. For example, cleaning an office space requires the services of a commercial cleaner, whereas cleaning a house requires a residential cleaner or residential cleaning service. Depending on the task, even these categories can be subdivided even further. For example, end-of-lease cleaning, carpet cleaning, upholstery cleaning, window cleaning, car cleaning services, etc. Cleaners often specialize in a specific cleaning sector or even a specific task in a cleaning sector, and one cannot expect a window cleaner to be able or willing to clean a carpet. For example, according to International Standard Classification of Occupations and European Skills, Competences, Qualifications and Occupations, the profession of a cleaner can be divided into:

- 9112.6 - train cleaner: "Train cleaners keep the interiors of trains tidy and clean. They clean out the bins in the different compartments, and perform other cleaning activities such as hoovering, mopping and deep cleaning."
- 9123.1 - window cleaner: "Window cleaners use cleaning tools such as sponges and detergents to clean windows, mirrors and other glass surfaces of buildings, both on the interior and exterior. They use specific ladders to clean taller buildings, using safety belts for support."
- 9122.1 - vehicle cleaner: "Vehicle cleaners clean and polish surfaces of external parts and interiors of vehicles."
- 9111.1 - domestic cleaner: "Domestic cleaners perform all necessary cleaning activities in order to clean their clients' houses. They vacuum and sweep floors, wash dishes, launder clothes, dust, scrub and polish surfaces and disinfect equipment and materials."
- 9129.2 - sewerage cleaner: "Sewerage cleaners maintain and clean sewerage systems and their pipes within communities. They remove blockages that stop the sewerage flow to ensure the smooth running of the systems."
- 9112.2 - building cleaner: "Building cleaners maintain the cleanliness and overall functionality of various types of buildings such as offices, hospitals and public institutions. They perform cleaning duties like sweeping, vacuuming and mopping floors, empty trash and check security systems, locks and windows. Building cleaners check air conditioning systems and notify the appropriate persons in case of malfunctions or problems."
- 9112.3 - furniture cleaner: "Furniture cleaners maintain furniture items by removing dust, applying furniture polish, cleaning stains and maintaining colouring."
- 5153.1.1 - amusement park cleaner: "Amusement park cleaners work to keep the amusement park clean and take on small repairs. Amusement park cleaners usually work at night, when the park is closed, but urgent maintenance and cleaning is done during the day."
- 8160.10 - cacao beans cleaner: "Cacao beans cleaners operate machines for the removal of foreign materials such as stones, string and dirt from cacao beans. They operate silos as to move beans from there to hoppers. They direct the cleaned beans to specified silos. They operate air-cleaning system in order to remove further foreign materials."
- 7133.2 - building exterior cleaner: "Building exterior cleaners remove dirt and litter from a building's exterior, as well as perform restoration tasks. They ensure the cleaning methods are compliant with safety regulations, and monitor the exteriors to ensure they are in proper condition."
- 9129.1 - drapery and carpet cleaner: "Drapery and carpet cleaners clean draperies and carpets for their clients by removing stains, dust or odors. They do this by applying chemical and repellent solutions and with the use of brushes or mechanical equipment."
- 9112.5 - toilet attendant: "Toilet attendants clean and maintain toilet facilities in accordance with company standards and policies. They use cleaning equipment to clean mirrors, floors, toilets and sinks. They perform the cleaning activities before, during and after operational service hours. Toilet attendants refill the facility with supplies as needed and maintain records of their daily operations."
- 9129 - Other cleaning workers: cleaning workers not classified

In addition:

- 9112.1 - Aircraft Groomer can clean in airplanes: "Aircraft groomers clean aircraft cabins and airplanes after usage. They vacuum or sweep the interior of cabin, brush debris from seats, and arrange seat belts. They clean trash and debris from seat pockets and arranged in-flight magazines, safety cards, and sickness bags. They also clean galleys and lavatories."
- 8157.1.1 - Laundry ironer: "Laundry ironers re-shape clothing items and linen and remove creases from them by using irons, presses and steamers. They clean and maintain the ironing and drying area and organise the items accordingly."
- 9129.3 - Swimming Facility Attendant: "Swimming facility attendants handle the daily activities of a swimming facility such as a swimming pool, beach and lake. They clean the facility, maintain a good attitude towards the clients and ensure the overall safety within the facility."
- 9129.2 Sewerage Cleaner: "Sewerage cleaners maintain and clean sewerage systems and their pipes within communities. They remove blockages that stop the sewerage flow to ensure the smooth running of the systems."
- Charity / free social cleaning: Cleaning can be done freely, free of charge and without employment e.g. social cleaning of the forest from garbage.
- Cleaning by convicts: Cleaning is sometimes done by convicts for rehabilitation or leniency purposes; cleaning as a substitute punishment. However, in some cases, cleaners are checked against criminal records.
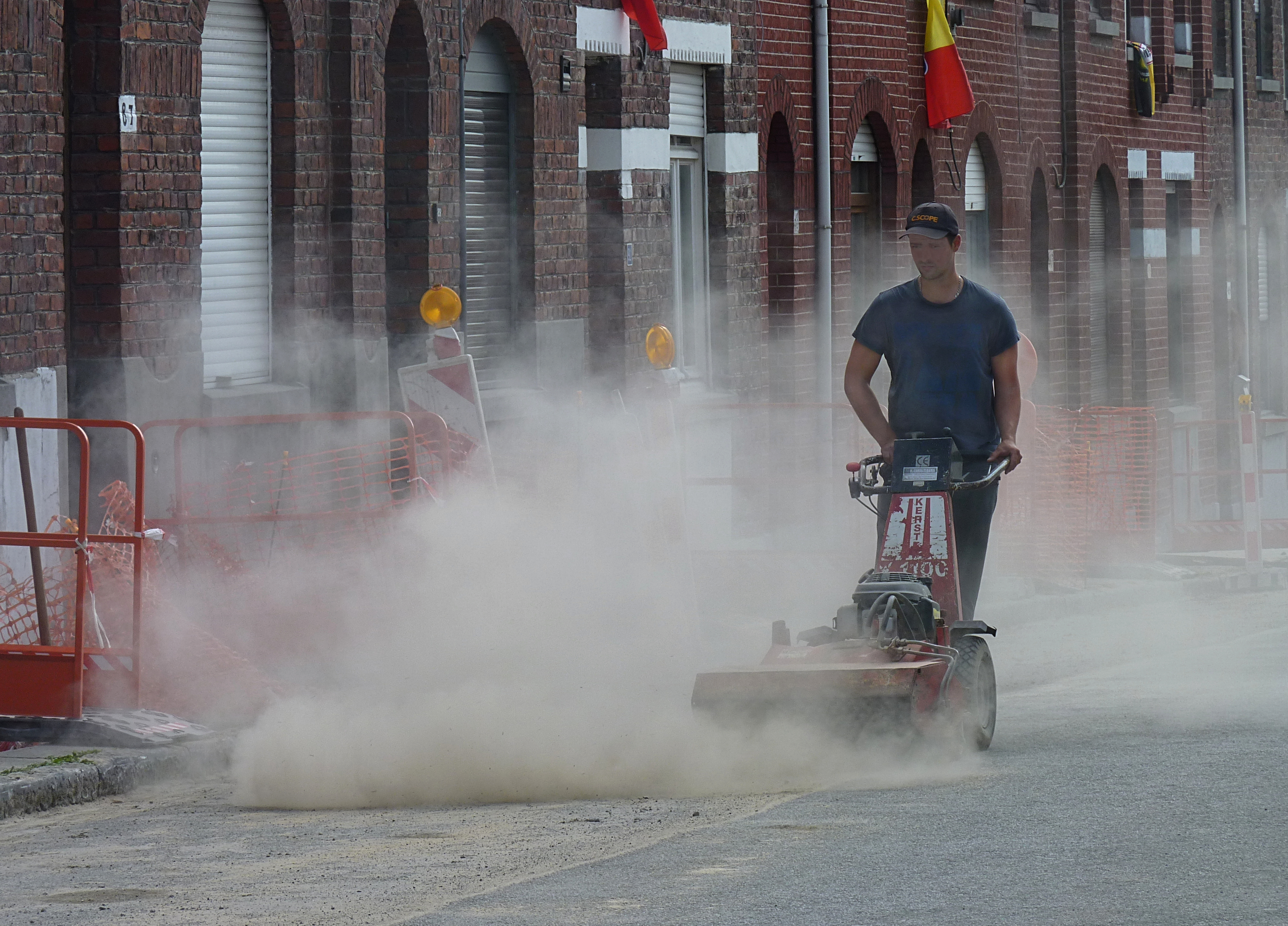
A cleaner using a mechanical sweeper to clean the street

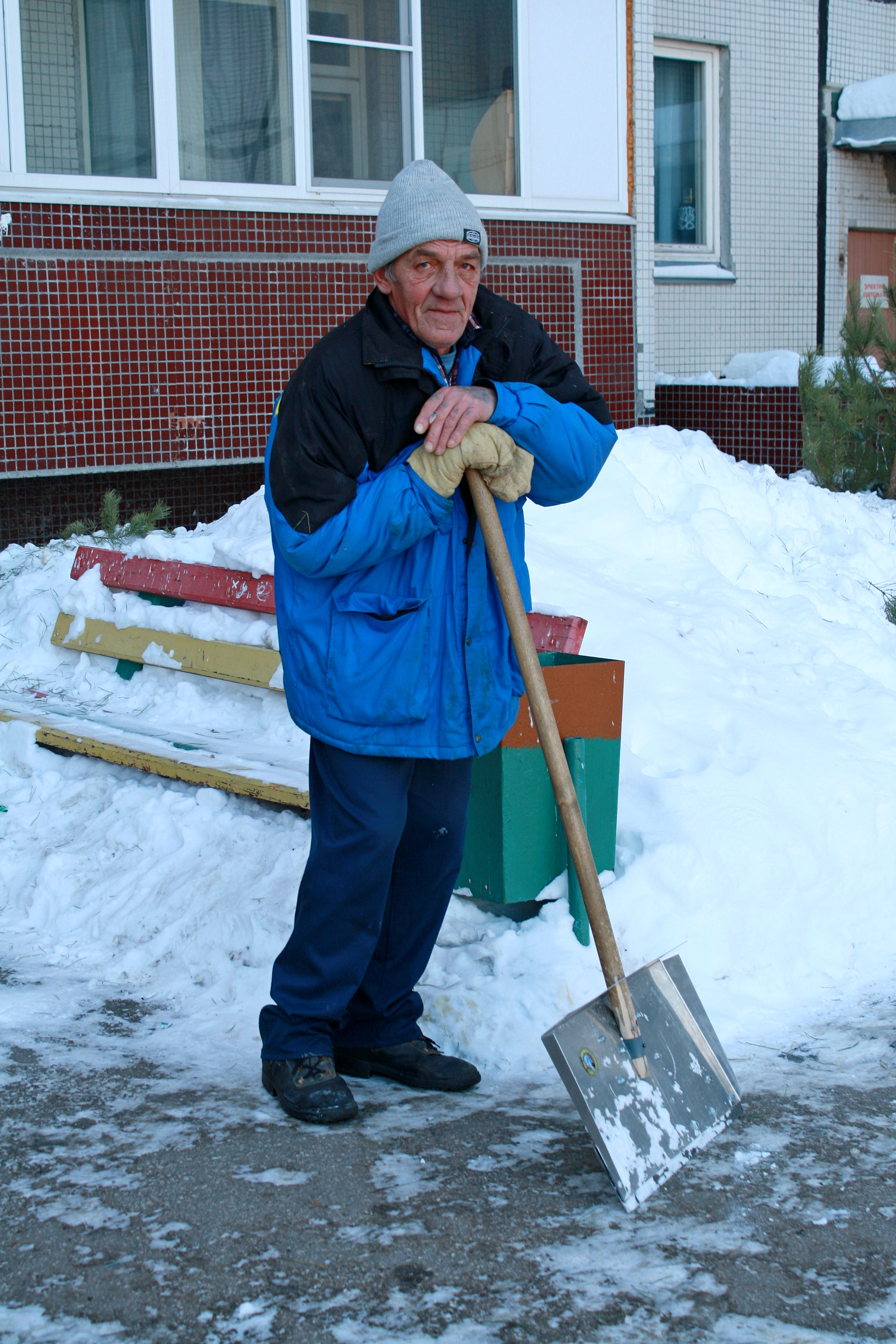
A cleaner shoveling snow off from the sidewalks.

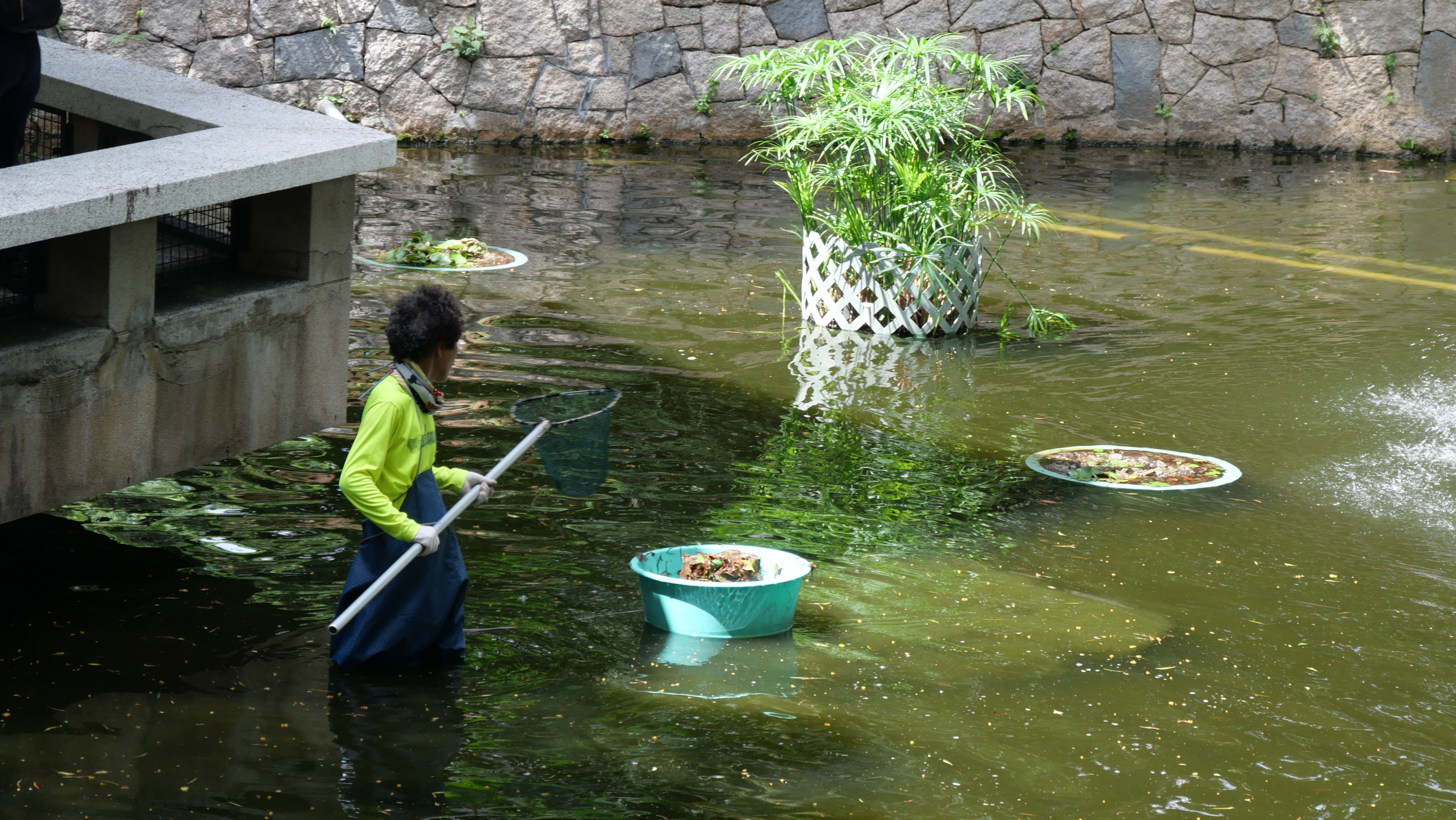
A Worker is cleaning pool at Kowloon Park

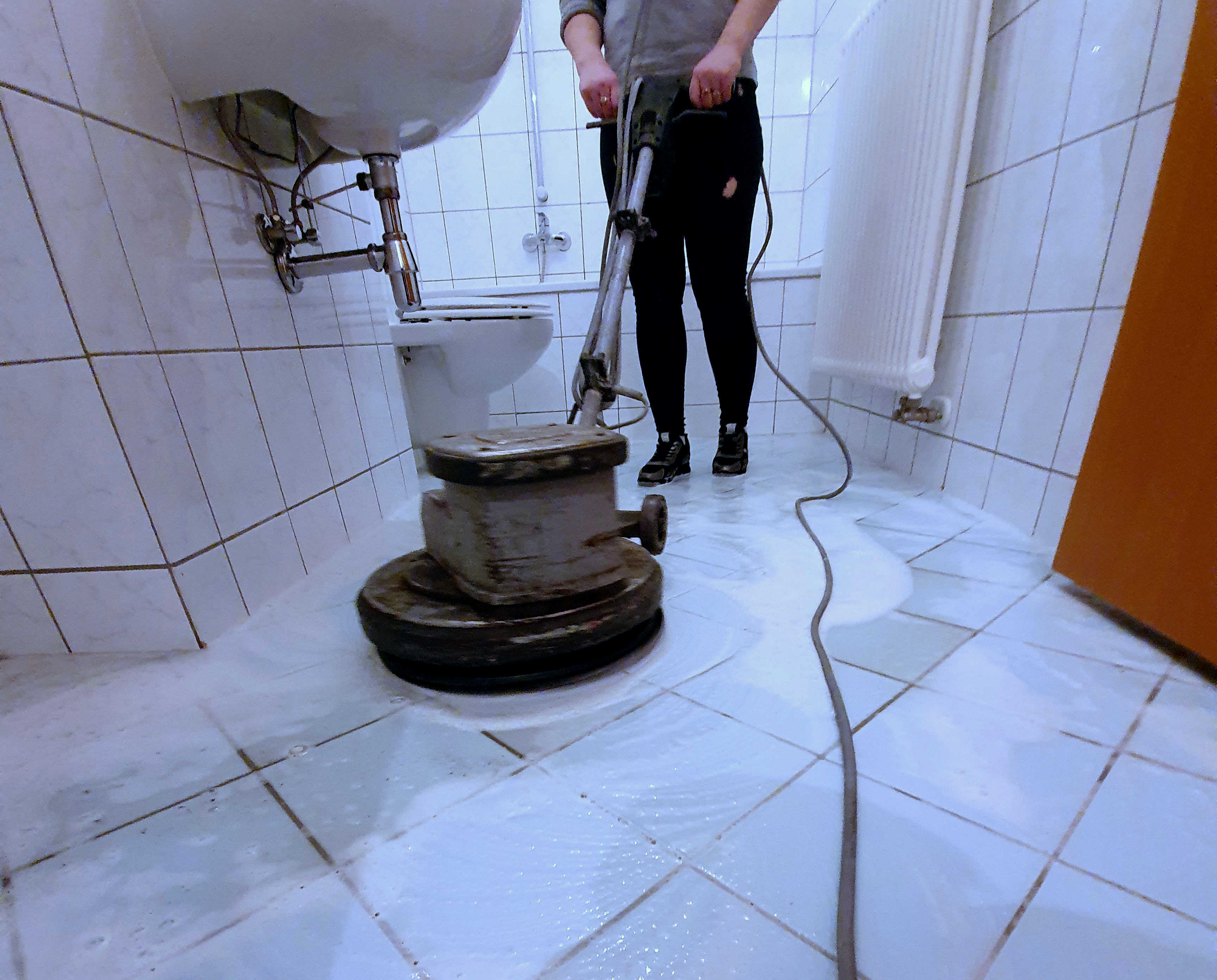
Cleaner cleaning the floor in the bathroom.

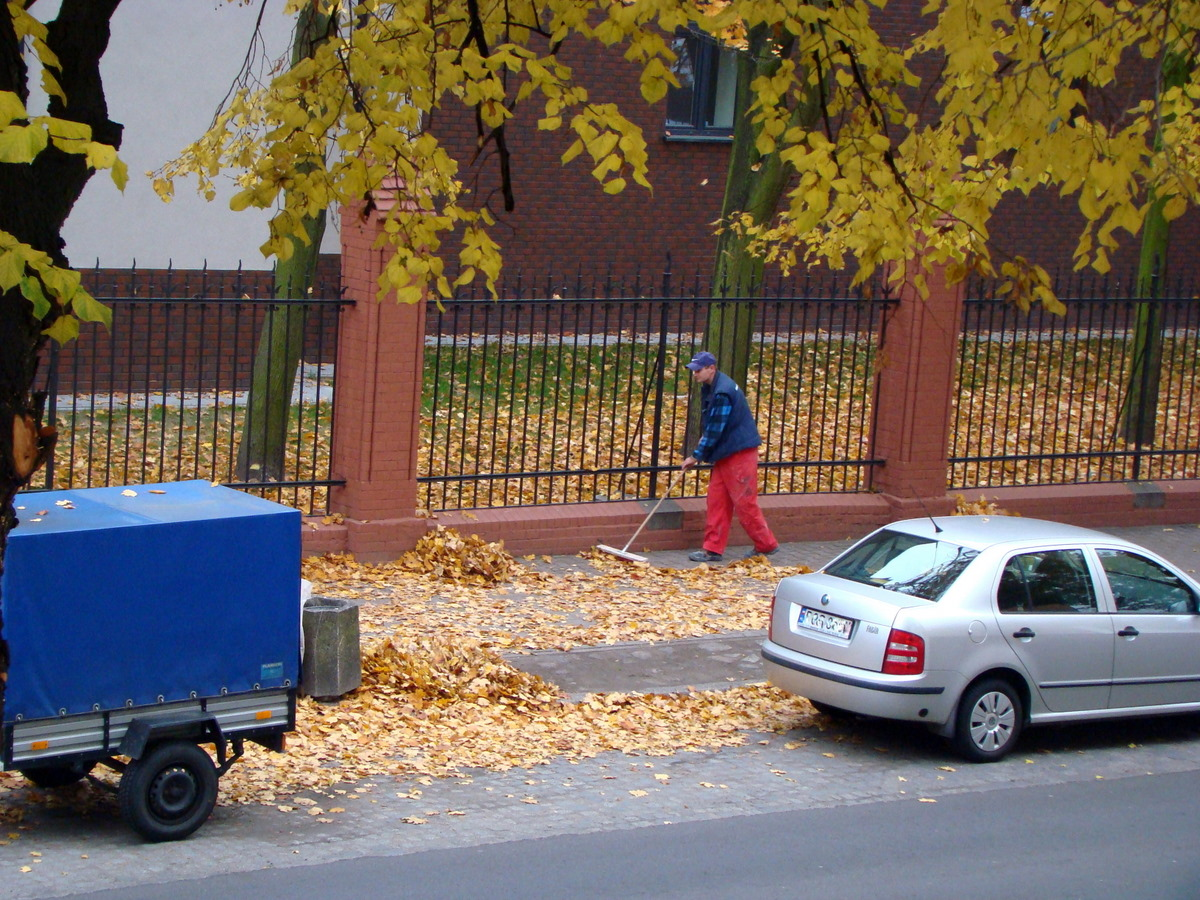
Cleaning the sidewalk from fallen leaves.

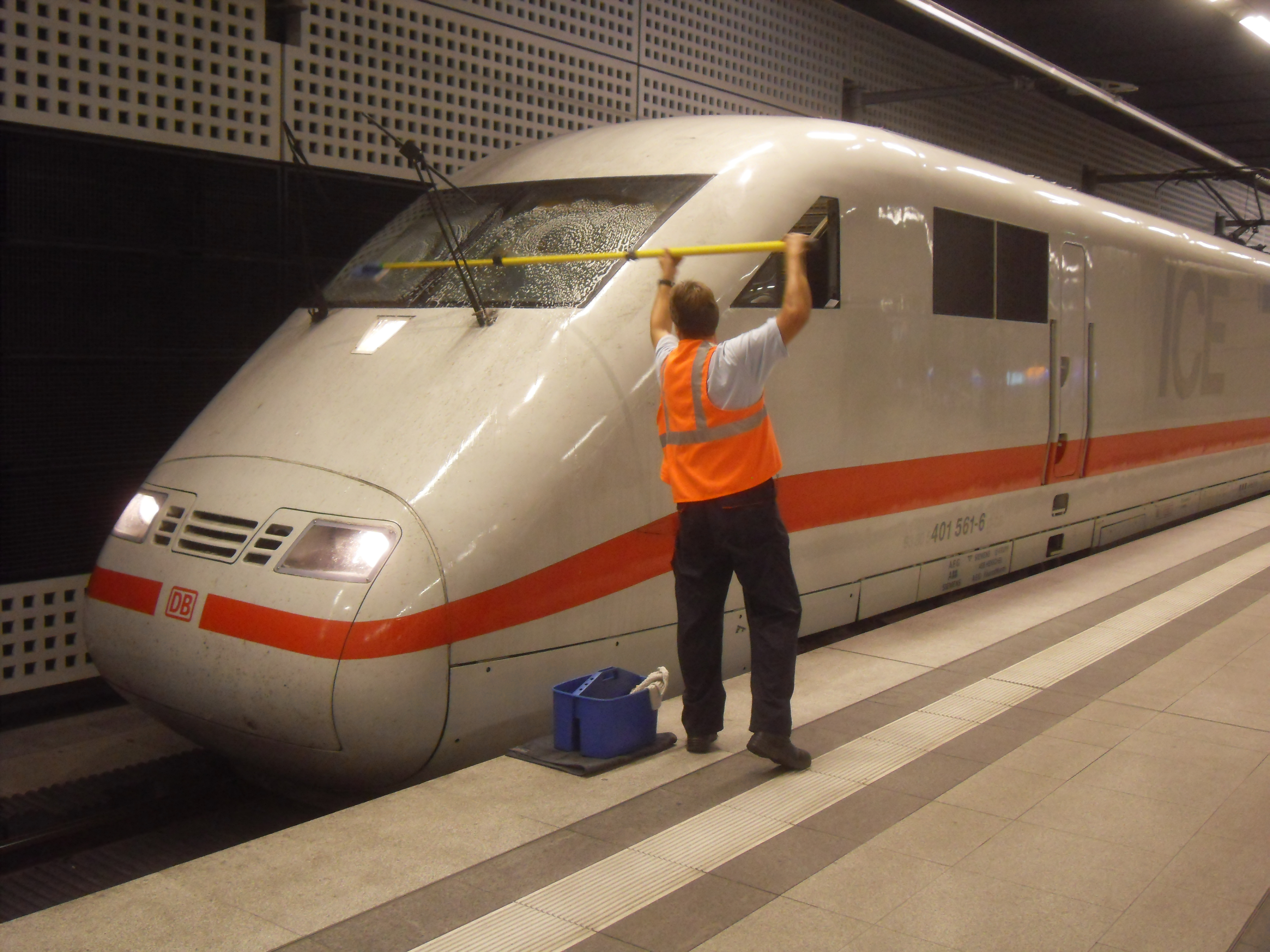
Train window cleaning.

=== Office cleaning ===
Office cleaning staff perform many of the same duties as janitors. However the tasks are divided among different members. Additional tasks can include:

- watering plants (pruning as well)
- cleaning sinks, refrigerators, microwave ovens, toasters in office kitchens, and clearing recycling / garbage bins
- dusting furniture, computer equipment (monitors and desk area, but excluding keyboards), and tables

== Occupational tasks ==
Most of the work performed by janitors and building cleaners is indoors. Office and school buildings are usually cleaned when they are vacant, so most of the office janitorial staff work during the evening. The work can be physically taxing and sometimes dirty and unpleasant.

General janitor duties often include the following tasks:

- Cleaning and restocking bathrooms
  - Sinks
  - Toilets
  - Urinals
- Cleaning floors (mopping, sweeping, polishing)
- Stripping and waxing floors using a floor buffer or Swing Machine
- Cleaning carpeting (vacuuming and/or extraction)
- Cleaning stainless steel and other special surfaces
- Clearing the lunch room/kitchen
- Cleaning tables in cubicles, meeting rooms, etc.
- Window washing
- Scrubbing concrete
- Emptying trash and recycling bins
- Unlocking and locking buildings at the beginning and end of the day
- Operation of building systems (turning on and off lights, setting thermostats, etc.) In some places, this may include testing/maintaining/setting building safety/security systems (fire alarms, burglar alarms, surveillance cameras, etc.)
- If the building is fitted with a Boiler system, then they may have to perform regular maintenance such as adding water softener salt, filling the feed tank, or ensuring the pressure is within regulation
- Cleaning air-conditioner vents
- Crime scene cleaning (requires being fully certified and pay scale starts from $300.00 to $700.00+ an hour)
- Room and event setups (tables and chairs, audio video equipment, etc.) (college/schools, etc.)
- Raising and lowering flags (schools)
- Removing graffiti or other forms of vandalism
- Minor maintenance work, such as: changing light bulbs and filters, replacing ceiling tiles, doing small repairs, fixing small leaks, performing testing and monitoring of building equipment, etc. In some places, other people may do these maintenance tasks.
- Outdoor work, such as: cleaning walkways, litter pickup, mowing lawns, tending to landscape plantings, leaf cleanup, snow removal, etc. In some places, groundskeepers or a separate company may do outdoor work.
- Porterage (internal deliveries; movement of equipment or people in hospitals, colleges, etc.)

== Typical cleaning equipment ==
The following are some items used by cleaning staff: However, the equipment depends on the situation and the type of cleaning.

- Broom/dustpan
- Bucket
- Cleaning agents
- Swing Machine/Burnisher
- Garbage bag
- Hand feather duster and/or microfiber floor duster
- Mop and mop bucket cart
- Towels
- Vacuum cleaner
- Wet floor sign

in addition: ladder, rake, bags for leaves.

Not always, but depending on the situation, (for example during cleaning dusty or dangerous substances or places, window cleaning at high heights, being on a busy street or in factories) items used by cleaning staff can include safety equipment such as:

- gloves
- overalls
- filter mask
- fitted hardhat
- height harness
- protective boots
- visibility clothing
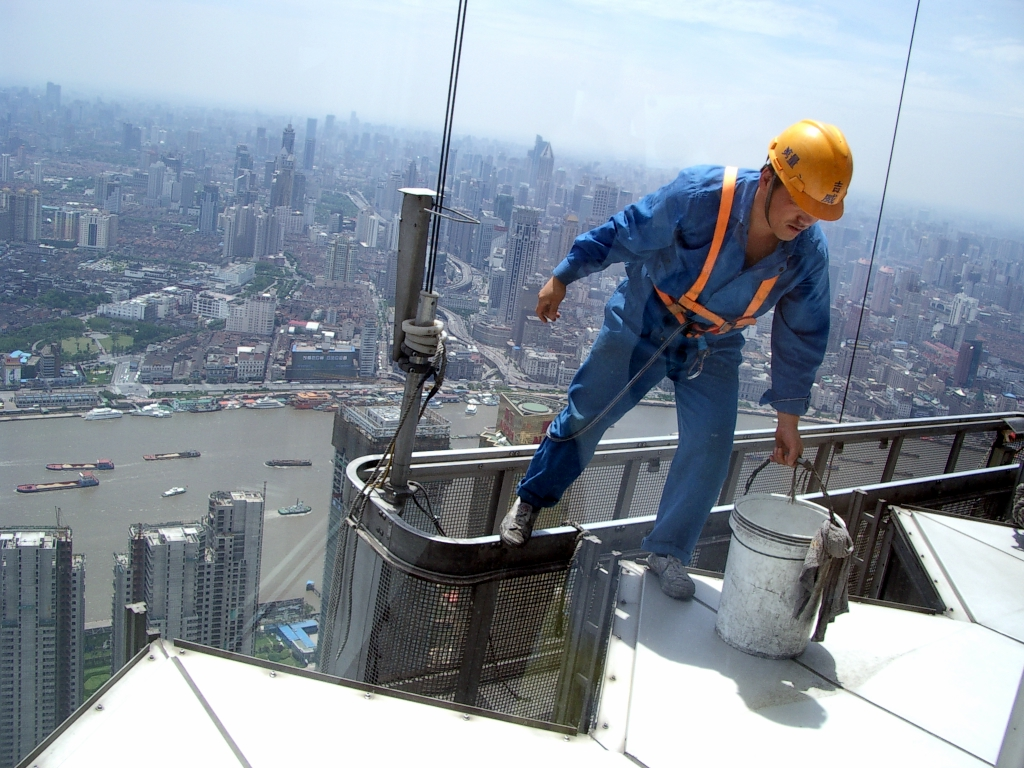
Window cleaner climbing out of a scaffold equipped with height harness and a fitted hardhat.

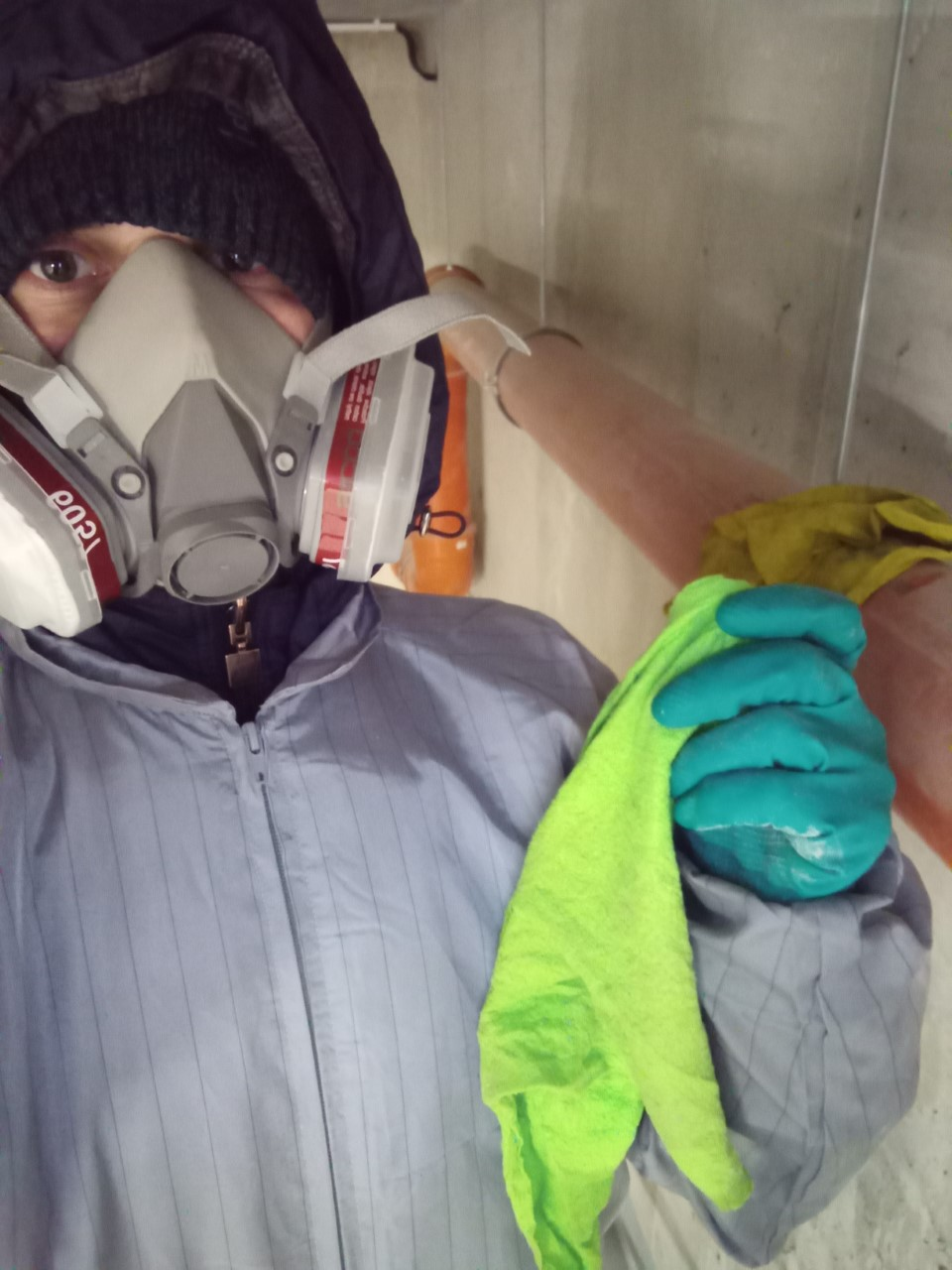
Cleaning a building in mask, overalls and gloves to prevent exposure to dust.

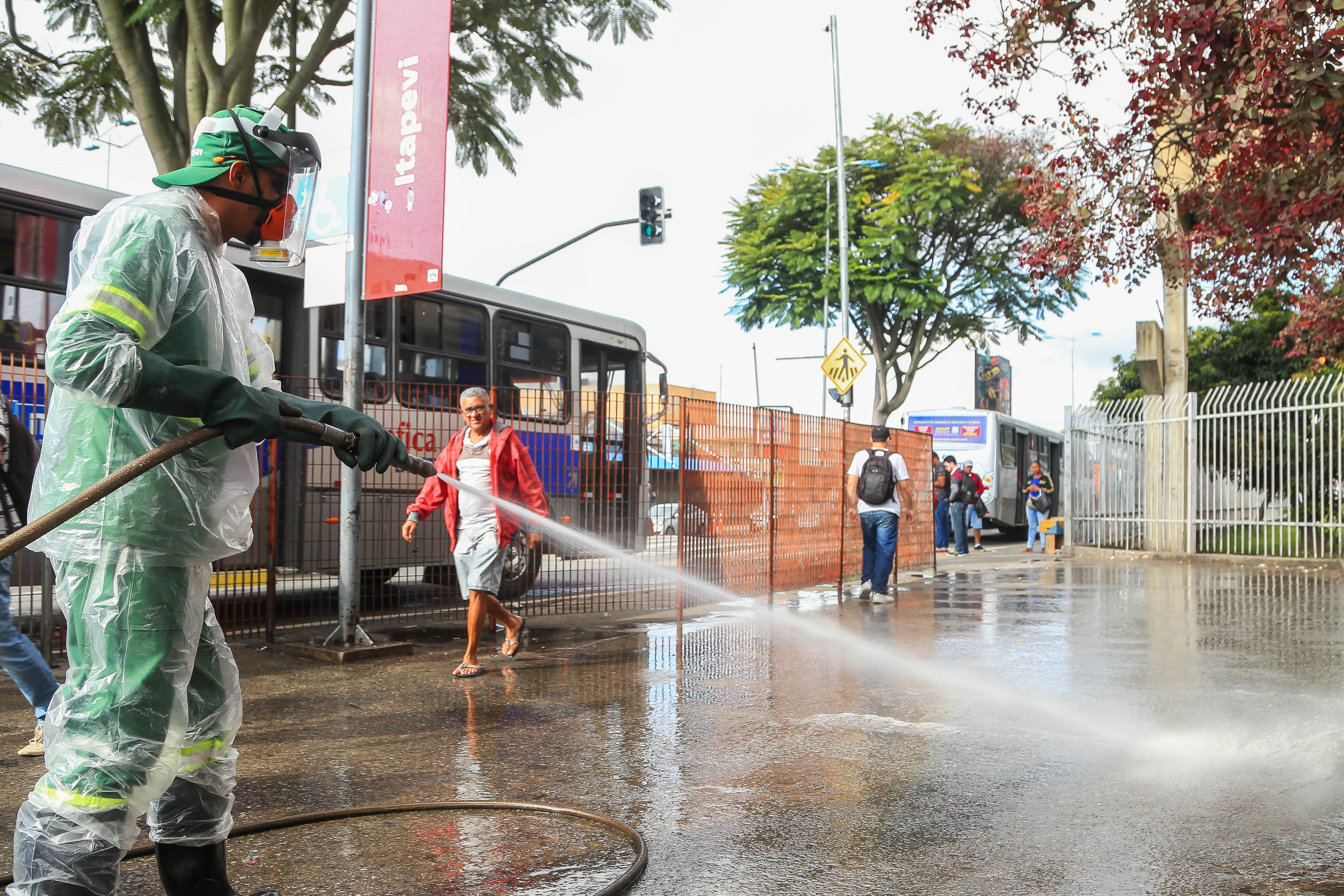
Washing and disinfection of the street during the COVID-19 pandemic with overalls, gloves, mask, and protective boots as protection against biohazards.

== Hazards ==
The exposure of a cleaner to hazards depends on the activity performed and the situation for example: allergens, dust, biohazards, fall, possibility of contact with electric shock, slipping on a slippery surface, so safety equipment should be adapted to the situation.

In addition: On the whole, it is not recommended to perform this work for a person with severe allergies.

== Working conditions ==
The 2000 film Bread and Roses by British director Ken Loach depicted the struggle of cleaners in Los Angeles, California, for better pay and working conditions and for the right to join a union. In an interview with the BBC in 2001, Loach stated that thousands of cleaners from around 30 countries have since contacted him with tales similar to the one told in the film.

== See also ==
- Building superintendent
- Charwoman
- Cleaning company
- Concierge
- Housekeeping
- Maid — In American English, the term "maid" is often used for any woman who cleans a home or hotel
- Property caretaker
- Sexton (office)
