= CCPR =

CCPR may refer to:

- Central Council of Physical Recreation
- International Covenant on Civil and Political Rights
- Chelatchie Prairie Railroad
- California Center for Population Research

== See also ==
- CPR
