= Donald Treiman =

American sociologist (born 1940)

Donald J. Treiman
- Born: October 13, 1940 (age 85)
- Awards: 2010 Robert M. Hauser Distinguished Career Award

Academic background
- Education: Reed College; University of Chicago

Academic work
- Discipline: Sociologist
- Institutions: University of California, Los Angeles

Donald J. Treiman (born October 13, 1940) is an American sociologist, currently the Distinguished Professor Emeritus at University of California, Los Angeles and an Elected Fellow of the American Association for the Advancement of Science. Treiman is known for his work on intergenerational mobility, occupational prestige, occupational socio-economic status scales, and the effects of internal migration on health.

== Education ==
Donald J. Treiman completed his Bachelor of Arts (B.A.) in Sociology at Reed College in 1962. Following his undergraduate studies, he attended the University of Chicago, where he completed his Master of Art (M.A.) in Sociology in 1965 and his Doctor of Philosophy (Ph.D.) in Sociology in 1967. During his graduate studies, Treiman developed his skills as a survey researcher at the National Opinion Research Center.

== Academic career ==
Treiman began his academic career after completing his doctorate at the University of Chicago.

=== Early Academic Roles (1967-1977) ===
Treiman's first academic appointment was as an assistant professor in the Department of Sociology at the University of Wisconsin (1967-1970). During his tenure, he focused on social demography and spent much time at the Center for Demography and Ecology, of which he served as the faculty associate (1967-1970). Later on, Treiman served as the co-director of the Methodology Training Program in the Department of Sociology (1969-1970).

In 1970, Treiman joined Columbia University as an associate professor in the Department of Sociology (1970-1973). While at the institution, he also served as senior research associate (1970-1976) and later the associate director (1971-1976) at the Center for Policy Research.

=== University of California, Los Angeles ===
In 1975, Treiman accepted a position as Associate Professor in the Department of Sociology at the University of California, Los Angeles (UCLA) (1975-1977). In 1977 he was promoted to Professor and in 2004 to Distinguished Professor. He formally retired in 2009 but has maintained an active research career since then, as Distinguished Professor Emeritus, as Distinguished Research Fellow, and as a Faculty Fellow of the UCLA's California Center for Population Research. He played several important administrative roles at UCLA, including serving as Associate Director of the Institute of Social Science Research (1975-1977), as Chair of the Department of Sociology (1977-1978), and as Director of the California Center for Population Research (2006-2008); he founded UCLA's Social Science Data Archive in 1977 and UCLA's Social Sciences Computing Center in 1982.

=== Leave Years ===
While at UCLA, Treiman enjoyed a number of sabbatical or similar leaves: ASA/NSF/Census Fellow, U.S. Bureau of the Census (1987-1988); Fellow, Center for Advanced Study in the Behavioral Sciences, Palo Alto (1992-1993); and Fellow, Netherlands Institute for Advanced Study in the Humanities and Social Sciences (1996-1997). He also took leave from UCLA to serve as Study Director for the Committee on Occupational Classification and Analysis (1978-1981) and the Committee on Basic Research in the Behavioral and Social Sciences (1979-1981), both at the National Academy of Sciences/National Research Council (United States). After his formal retirement he was appointed Visiting Research Professor, Asia Research Institute, National University of Singapore (Oct-Dec 2012).

=== Ancillary Teaching ===
Treiman also taught at other, mostly foreign, universities and research centers, mainly intensive short courses in quantitative data analysis and most after he formally retired from UCLA. These include a training seminar in cross-national data analysis, Vienna, Austria, 1997; the Winter School of the Human Sciences Research Council, Pretoria, South Africa, 1993 and 1994; Zhongshan University, People's Republic of China, 1997; the Winter School, University of Transkei, South Africa, 1998; the Winter School, University of Fort Hare, South Africa, 1998; University of Zurich, Switzerland, 1999; Stellenbosch University, South Africa, 1999; Pontifical Catholic University of Chile, Santiago, 2007; University of Michigan-Peking University Joint Institute Summer School, Beijing, 2008, 2012, 2014; Hong Kong University of Science and Technology, Fall 2010; Masaryk University, Brno, Czech Republic, 2012; Koç University, Istanbul, Turkey, 2012; Applied Research Methods Workshop (Summer), Shanghai University, 2015; and Yale University, Fall 2016.

== Research ==
Donald J. Treiman is known for his contributions to the field of social stratification, specifically his work in the areas of intergenerational mobility, occupational prestige, occupational socioeconomic status scores, and the impact of migration on child development. Treiman has published 13 books and 83 academic articles. He and colleagues also collected high quality national probability sample surveys in South Africa, six Eastern European Nations, and China.

=== Standard International Occupational Prestige Scale ===
Donald J. Treiman developed the Standard International Occupational Prestige Scale (SIOPS) in the 1970s. Treiman describes the development of the SIOPS in Occupational Prestige in Comparative Perspective (1977). In this book, Treiman introduced the concept that there is a high level of cross-national uniformity among evaluations of occupational prestige. This concept, sometimes referred to as the Treiman Constant, served as the basis for the SIOPS. Treiman used occupational prestige data on 509 occupations from 55 countries to produce prestige scores for each of the individual occupations as well as the unit, minor, and major group categories of the International Standard Classification of Occupations (ISCO). Treiman argued that the SIOPS is an accurate predictor of occupational prestige within each individual country and claimed a higher level of accuracy than alternative scales. This perspective challenges the assumption that occupational prestige hierarchies vary by time and place and instead emphasizes a common ground from the cross-national perspective.

=== International Socio-Economic Index of occupational status ===
Expanding upon his work on the SIOPS, Treiman worked with Harry Ganzeboom and Paul Graaf to develop the International Socio-Economic Index (ISEI) of occupational status. The ISEI was designed to capture occupational hierarchies among socio-economic scores rather than measures of prestige or class. Socio-Economic Index (SEI) scales are defined as "weighted sum[s] of the average education and average income of occupational groups." Treiman and his colleagues present occupation as the means through which education is related to income, and therefore SEI as an approximation of a given occupation's position in a hierarchy. Treiman and his colleagues employed data from 73,901 men from 16 countries to construct the ISEI, which they derived from the ISCO. Treiman and colleagues argued that the ISEI performs similarly to alternative scales, including the SIOPS, in explaining occupational hierarchies cross-nationally. The ISEI has been updated and is still in use.

=== Intergenerational Mobility ===
Treiman's contributions to the study of intergenerational mobility focus on cross-national comparisons and trends. Treiman and Ganzeboom created the International Stratification and Mobility File (ISMF), which serves as a comparative database. Treiman and colleagues employed 149 data sets from 35 countries, all of which contained information on connections between a son's current occupation and his father's occupation, which served to capture intergenerational mobility. Through the use of multiple intergenerational mobility tables from each country studied, Treiman and colleagues attempted to reduce the effects of measurement error. At the time of development, the major findings of the ISMF were that a high level of variation existed between the mobility patterns of different countries and that overall unequal mobility chances were declining. With their findings, Treiman and colleagues challenged the concept of common social fluidity, which suggests homogeneity among mobility structures both geographically and temporally. Currently, the ISMF contains over 250 surveys from 56 countries, which includes two million people.

In particular, Treiman has focused on how social mobility and status attainment are affected by variations across nations and over time in the way societies are organized. His first paper on this topic was a conceptual literature review, "Industrialization and Social Stratification," written in 1970 and still cited today; in 1989 he published an empirical test of some of the hypotheses in the 1970 paper. Since then, he and his colleagues have shown how China differs from other nations and how the Cultural Revolution in China and other changes over time affected the life chances of individuals; how Communist Eastern Europe differed from Western Democracies and changes with the collapse of Communism in 1989; and how and why racial variations in status attainment were particularly severe in South Africa.

=== Internal Migration and Effects on Health ===
Recently, Treiman has focused on the effects of internal migration on health of both children and adults in China. In 2008, Treiman conducted the Chinese Migration and Health Survey with colleagues William Mason, Shige Song, and Wang Wei. The survey collected educational, familial, residential, and employment data for 3,000 Chinese adults. Treiman and colleagues reported mixed conclusions on the relationship between migration and health, as they found that migrants had higher incomes on average than non-migrants and were more likely to access healthcare providers, but were less likely to be insured. Overall, Treiman and colleagues concluded that the patterns and consequences of internal migration in China were similar to trends observed in other countries.

Following this work, Treiman turned his attention to the impacts of internal migration on the health of Chinese children. With colleagues Yao Lu, Jean Wei-Jun Yeung, and Jingming Liu, Treiman indicated the negative psychological outcomes experienced by children left behind by both parents compared to children who migrated with their parents. Treiman and colleagues designed and utilized The Urbanization and Child Development Study to argue the existence of this disparity. Overall, Treiman and colleagues argue that internal migration patterns which disrupt family structures leave children developmentally vulnerable, therefore harming "the social development of the society."

== Honors and awards ==
Apart from sabbaticals and invited lectureships, Treiman was elected to the Sociological Research Association in 1980, was the President of the Research Committee on Social Stratification and Mobility of the International Sociological Association (1990-1998), and was elected as a Fellow of the American Association for the Advancement of Science in 1991. He was the NUSS Distinguished Professor (2011). In 2012, he was the recipient of the Robert M. Hauser Distinguished Career Award by the Poverty, Inequality, and Mobility Section of the American Sociological Association. In 2017, he was recognized as an Honored Colleague by the Population Association of America.

== Professional Memberships ==
Treiman is a member of the Sociological Research Association, the Population Association of America, the Research Committee on Social Stratification and Mobility of the International Sociological Association, the Sociological Research Association, and the American Association for the Advancement of Science.
