= Eparchy =

Diocese in Eastern Christianity

Eparchy (Greek: ἐπαρχία eparchía "overlordship") is an ecclesiastical unit in Eastern Christianity that is equivalent to a diocese in Western Christianity. An eparchy is governed by an eparch, who is a bishop. Depending on the administrative structure of a specific Eastern Church, an eparchy can belong to an ecclesiastical province (usually a metropolis), but it can also be exempt. Each eparchy is divided into parishes, in the same manner as a diocese in Western Churches. Historical development of eparchies in various Eastern Churches was marked by local distinctions that can be observed in modern ecclesiastical practices of the Eastern Orthodox Church, Oriental Orthodox Churches and Eastern Catholic Churches.

== Terminology ==
The English word eparchy is an anglicized term that comes from the original Greek word (Koine Greek: ἐπαρχία, romanized: eparchía, lit. 'overlordship', Byzantine Greek pronunciation: [e.parˈçi.a]). It is an abstract noun, formed with an intensive prefix (ἐπι-, epi-, lit. 'over-' + ἄρχειν, árchein, lit. 'to be ruler'). It is commonly Latinized as eparchia. The term can be loosely translated as the rule over something (literally: an overlordship). The term had various meanings and multiple uses throughout history, mainly in politics and administration, starting from the Hellenistic period, and continuing throughout the Roman era.

In the Greco-Roman world, it was used as a Greek equivalent for the Latin term provincia, denoting province, the main administrative unit of the Roman Empire. The same use was employed in the early Byzantine Empire until major administrative reforms that were undertaken between the 7th and 9th centuries, abolishing the old provincial system. In modern times, the term was also employed within administrative systems of some countries, like Greece and Cyprus.

Since it was commonly used as the main Greek designation for an administrative province of the Roman Empire, the term eparchy consequently gained an additional use among Greek-speaking Christians, denoting ecclesiastical structures on the provincial level of Church administration, within Eastern Christianity. Such terminological borrowing resulted from the final consolidation of the provincial (metropolitan) system in the 4th century. The First Ecumenical Council (325) confirmed (Canon IV) that all bishops of each civil province should be grouped in one ecclesiastical province, headed by a metropolitan (bishop of the provincial capital). Since civil provinces were called eparchies in Greek, the same term was used to define ecclesiastical provinces. Such use became customary, and metropolitan provinces came to be known as eparchies.

== Eastern Orthodox Church ==
Eparchies of the Russian Orthodox Church

Eparchies of the Serbian Orthodox Church

Throughout the late antiquity and the early medieval period, within Eastern Orthodox terminology, the term eparchy remained a common designation for a metropolitan province i.e. metropolis (Greek: μητρόπολις, Latin: metropolis).

During the later medieval period, terminology started to shift, particularly within the Patriarchate of Constantinople. The process of title-inflation that was affecting Byzantine bureaucracy and aristocracy also gained momentum in ecclesiastical circles. In order to promote centralization, patriarchal authorities started to multiply the numbers of metropolitans by elevating local bishops to honorary metropolitan ranks without giving them any real metropolitan powers, and making them directly appointed and thus more dependent on Constantinople. As a consequence, the use of the word eparchy was expanded to include not only proper metropolitan provinces, but also the newly created honorary metropolitan sees that were not real provinces, and thus no different from simple bishoprics except in honorary titles and ranks. In spite of that, such honorary metropolitan sees also came to be called eparchies. This process was systematically promoted, thus resulting in a major terminological shift.

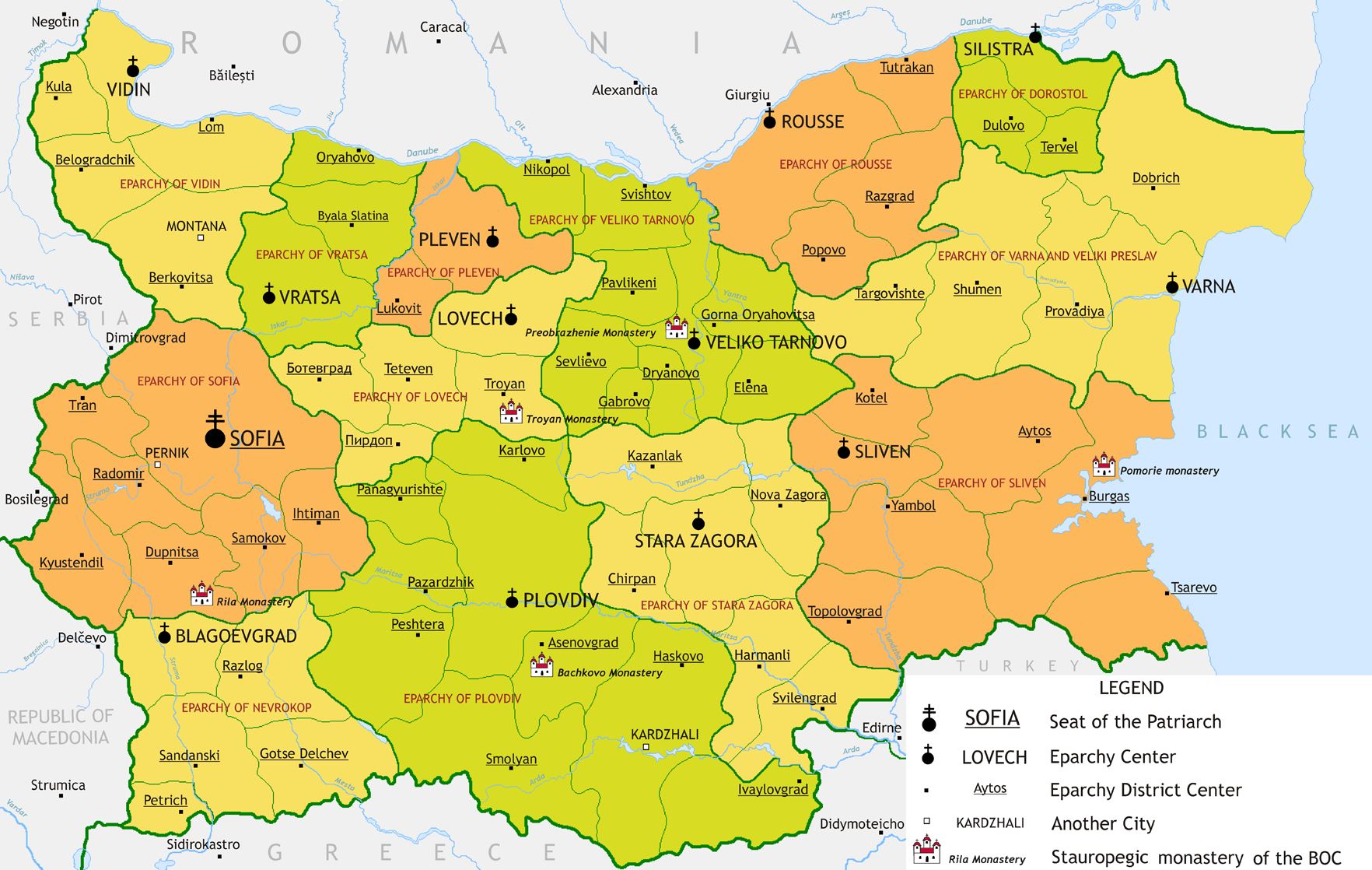
Eparchies of the Bulgarian Orthodox Church

Eparchies of the Georgian Orthodox Church

Since the fragmentation of the original metropolitan provinces into several titular metropolises that were also referred to as eparchies, the Patriarchate of Constantinople became more centralized, and such structure has remained up to the present day. Similar ecclesiastical terminology is also employed by other autocephalous and autonomous churches within Eastern Orthodox community. In those who are non-Greek, term eparchy is used in local variants, and also has various equivalents in local languages.

Eparchies of the main Eastern Orthodox churches:

- Eparchies of the Ecumenical Patriarchate of Constantinople
- Eparchies of the Greek Orthodox Patriarchate of Alexandria
- Eparchies of the Greek Orthodox Patriarchate of Antiochia
- Eparchies of the Greek Orthodox Patriarchate of Jerusalem
- Eparchies of the Russian Orthodox Church
- Eparchies of the Serbian Orthodox Church
- Eparchies of the Romanian Orthodox Church
- Eparchies of the Bulgarian Orthodox Church
- Eparchies of the Georgian Orthodox Church
- Eparchies of the Cypriot Orthodox Church
- Eparchies of the Orthodox Church of Greece
- Eparchies of the Polish Orthodox Church
- Eparchies of the Albanian Orthodox Church
- Eparchies of the Czech and Slovak Orthodox Church

== Eastern Catholic Churches ==
In the Eastern Catholic Churches, eparchy is equivalent to a diocese of the Latin Church, and its bishop can be called an eparch (equivalent to a diocesan of the Latin Church). Similarly, an archeparchy is equivalent to an archdiocese of the Latin Church and its bishop can be called an archeparch (equivalent to an archbishop of the Roman Rite).

Individual eparchies of some Eastern Catholic Churches may be suffragan to Latin Church metropolitans. For example, the Greek Catholic Eparchy of Križevci is suffragan to the Roman Catholic Archdiocese of Zagreb. Also, some minor Eastern Catholic churches have Latin prelates. For example, the Macedonian Greek Catholic Church is organized as a single Eparchy of Strumica-Skopje, whose present ordinary is the Roman Catholic bishop of Skopje.

== See also ==
- Eparchy (Roman province)
- Eparchy (Byzantine province)
- Eparchy (modern Greece)
- Eparchy (modern Cyprus)

== Sources ==
- Cross, Frank L.; Livingstone, Elizabeth A., eds. (2005) [1957]. The Oxford Dictionary of the Christian Church (3rd rev. ed.). Oxford: Oxford University Press. ISBN 978-0-19-280290-3.
- Kiminas, Demetrius (2009). The Ecumenical Patriarchate: A History of Its Metropolitanates with Annotated Hierarch Catalogs. Wildside Press LLC. ISBN 9781434458766.
- Mason, Hugh J. (1974). Greek Terms for Roman Institutions: A Lexicon and Analysis. Toronto: Hakkert. ISBN 9780888660138.
- Meyendorff, John (1989). Imperial unity and Christian divisions: The Church 450-680 A.D. Crestwood, NY: St. Vladimir's Seminary Press. ISBN 9780881410563. Archived from the original on 2024-12-12.
- Nedungatt, George, ed. (2002). A Guide to the Eastern Code: A Commentary on the Code of Canons of the Eastern Churches. Rome: Oriental Institute Press. ISBN 9788872103364.
- Ohme, Heinz (2012). "Sources of the Greek Canon Law to the Quinisext Council (691/2): Councils and Church Fathers". The History of Byzantine and Eastern Canon Law to 1500. Washington: CUA Press. pp. 24–114. ISBN 9780813216799.
- Ostrogorsky, George (1956). History of the Byzantine State. Oxford: Basil Blackwell. Archived from the original on 2024-09-30.
- Stevenson, Angus, ed. (2010) [1998]. Oxford Dictionary of English (3rd ed.). Oxford: Oxford University Press. ISBN 978-0-19-957112-3.
- Vitale, Marco (2012). Eparchie und Koinon in Kleinasien von der ausgehenden Republik bis ins 3. Jh. n. Chr. Bonn: Dr. Rudolf Habelt Verlag. ISBN 9783774937390.
- Vitale, Marco (2016). "Priest—Eparchy-arch—Speaker of the Ethnos: The Areas of Responsibility of the Highest Officials of the Eastern Provincial Imperial Cult". Mnemosyne. 69 (1): 82–111. doi:10.1163/1568525X-12341727.
