= Susan Short =

Sociology professor

- Education: University of North Carolina at Chapel Hill
- Scientific career
- Thesis: Birth planning, sterilization, and the care of children in China (1997)

Susan E. Short is the Robert E. Turner Distinguished Professor of Population Studies at Brown University who is known for her work on how gender, family, health and well-being are effected by social and political environments.

== Education ==
Short received her B.A. in Human Biology from Stanford University in 1986. She earned a Master's (1994) and a Ph.D. (1997) from the University of North Carolina, Chapel Hill.

== Career ==
After receiving her PhD in 1997, Short began in her role as assistant professor at Brown University. Short served as a visiting scholar at the National University of Lesotho from 2003 to 2004 studying the AIDS epidemic in Sub-Saharan Africa. Additionally, she was a visiting scientist at Harvard School of Public Health from 2008 to 2010. From 2011 to 2014, Short was Director of Graduate Studies for the Sociology Department at Brown University. In 2022, she was named the Robert E. Turner Distinguished Professor of Population Studies at Brown University.

== Research ==
Short's research highlights changing social and political environments and their implications for family dynamics, gender, health, and well-being. Her research examines a variety of issues, including, economic reform and the one child policy in China, the HIV/AIDS pandemic in Lesotho, and changes in the organization of women's work and parenting in the United States.

== Selected publications ==
- Short, Susan E; Mollborn, Stefanie (2015-10-01). "Social determinants and health behaviors: conceptual frames and empirical advances". Current Opinion in Psychology. 5: 78–84. doi:10.1016/j.copsyc.2015.05.002. ISSN 2352-250X. PMC 4511598. PMID 26213711.
- Torr, Berna Miller; Short, Susan E. (2004). "Second Births and the Second Shift: A Research Note on Gender Equity and Fertility". Population and Development Review. 30 (1): 109–130. doi:10.1111/j.1728-4457.2004.00005.x. ISSN 0098-7921.
- Short, Susan E.; Yang, Yang Claire; Jenkins, Tania M. (2013). "Sex, Gender, Genetics, and Health". American Journal of Public Health. 103 (S1): S93–S101. doi:10.2105/AJPH.2013.301229. ISSN 0090-0036. PMC 3786754. PMID 23927517.
- Short, Susan E.; Fengying, Zhai (1998). "Looking Locally at China's One-Child Policy". Studies in Family Planning. 29 (4): 373–387. doi:10.2307/172250. ISSN 0039-3665. JSTOR 172250. PMID 9919631.

== Awards and honors ==
In 2016, Short was elected to the Sociological Research Association. Short was elected a fellow of the American Association for the Advancement of Science in 2020.
