= Jennie Brand =

Jennie Brand may refer to:

- Jennie Brand-Miller (born 1952), Australian nutritionist
- Jennie E. Brand (born 1976), American sociologist and social statistician
