= Jennie E. Brand =

American sociologist (born 1976)

- Born: 1976 (age 49–50); Los Angeles
- Education: University of Wisconsin–Madison; University of California, San Diego
- Known for: Social stratification Sociology of education Quantitative methodology
- Scientific career
- Fields: Sociology, statistics
- Workplaces: University of California, Los Angeles; University of North Carolina at Chapel Hill; University of Michigan
- Thesis: Enduring effects of job displacement on career outcomes (2004)
- Doctoral advisors: Charles N. Halaby; Robert M. Hauser; Lincoln Quillian; Michael Handel; Karen Holden

Jennie E. Brand is an American sociologist and social statistician. She studies stratification, social inequality, education, social demography, disruptive events, and quantitative methods, including causal inference. Brand is currently Professor of Sociology and Statistics at the University of California, Los Angeles (UCLA), where she directs the California Center for Population Research and co-directs the Center for Social Statistics.

== Education and career ==
Brand received a B.A. in sociology and philosophy from the University of California, San Diego in 1997 and a Ph.D. in sociology from the University of Wisconsin–Madison in 2004.

Brand was a postdoctoral fellow at the University of Michigan from 2004 to 2006 and Carolina Population Center Fellow and assistant professor of Public Policy at the University of North Carolina at Chapel Hill from 2006 to 2007.

Brand moved to UCLA in 2007 as assistant professor of sociology. She was promoted to associate professor in 2010 and Professor in 2016.

Brand was elected to the Sociological Research Association in 2019. She was the first woman to receive the Leo A. Goodman Award for "an outstanding researcher within 10 years of their Ph.D." from the American Sociological Association (ASA). Until 2021, she chaired the Methodology Section of the ASA, currently chairs the Inequality, Poverty, and Mobility Section of the ASA, and sits on the boards of the International Sociological Association's Research Committee on Social Stratification and Mobility, the Bureau of Labor Statistics National Longitudinal Surveys Program Technical Review Committee, and the General Social Survey.

== Research ==
Brand has made notable empirical contributions in the subfields of social stratification and the sociology of education. In an influential 2010 study of returns to higher education, Brand and Yu Xie challenge the conventional economistic view that comparative advantage would make the individuals with the most to gain from a college degree more likely to seek one out. They argue instead that the individuals least likely to attend college benefit the most from it.

Brand has also made significant methodological contributions to quantitative sociology. She has published extensively on treatment effect heterogeneity and propensity score matching. She serves on the editorial board of Sociological Methods & Research.

=== Publications ===
Brand's most cited publications are:

- Brand, Jennie E. and Yu Xie. 2010. “Who Benefits Most from College? Evidence for Negative Selection in Heterogeneous Economic Returns to Higher Education.” American Sociological Review 75(2):273-302.
- Burgard, Sarah A., Jennie E. Brand, and James S. House. 2009. “Perceived Job Insecurity and Worker Health in the United States.” Social Science & Medicine 69(5):777-785.
- Brand, Jennie E. 2015. “The Far-Reaching Impact of Job Loss and Unemployment.” Annual Review of Sociology 41:359-375.
- Burgard, Sarah A., Jennie E. Brand, and James S. House. 2007. “Toward a Better Estimation of the Effect of Job Loss on Health.” Journal of Health and Social Behavior 48(4):369-384.
