= HISCO =

The Historical International Standard of Classification of Occupations or HISCO is a theoretical model used to code social class and occupational status. Formulated in 2002, the model complements the ILO's ISCO68 scheme, as it prescribes a universal code system for examining occupation descriptions. The book received a positive review in the Journal of Social History.
