= European Skills, Competences, Qualifications and Occupations =

European Skills, Competences, Qualifications and Occupations (ESCO) is a multilingual classification that identifies and categorises skills, competences, qualifications and occupations relevant for the EU labour market and education. ESCO has been developed by The European Commission since 2010.

== Overview ==
ESCO v1.2 contains about 3 039 occupations, each occupation is classified according to International Standard Classification of Occupations (version 2008).

ESCO is published in the 24 official languages of the European Union as well as in Norwegian, Icelandic, Ukrainian and Arabic.

ESCO is an extension of the ISCO scheme.

== See also ==
- Occupational Information Network
