= Job title inflation =

Phenomenon of increasingly grandiose job titles in organisations

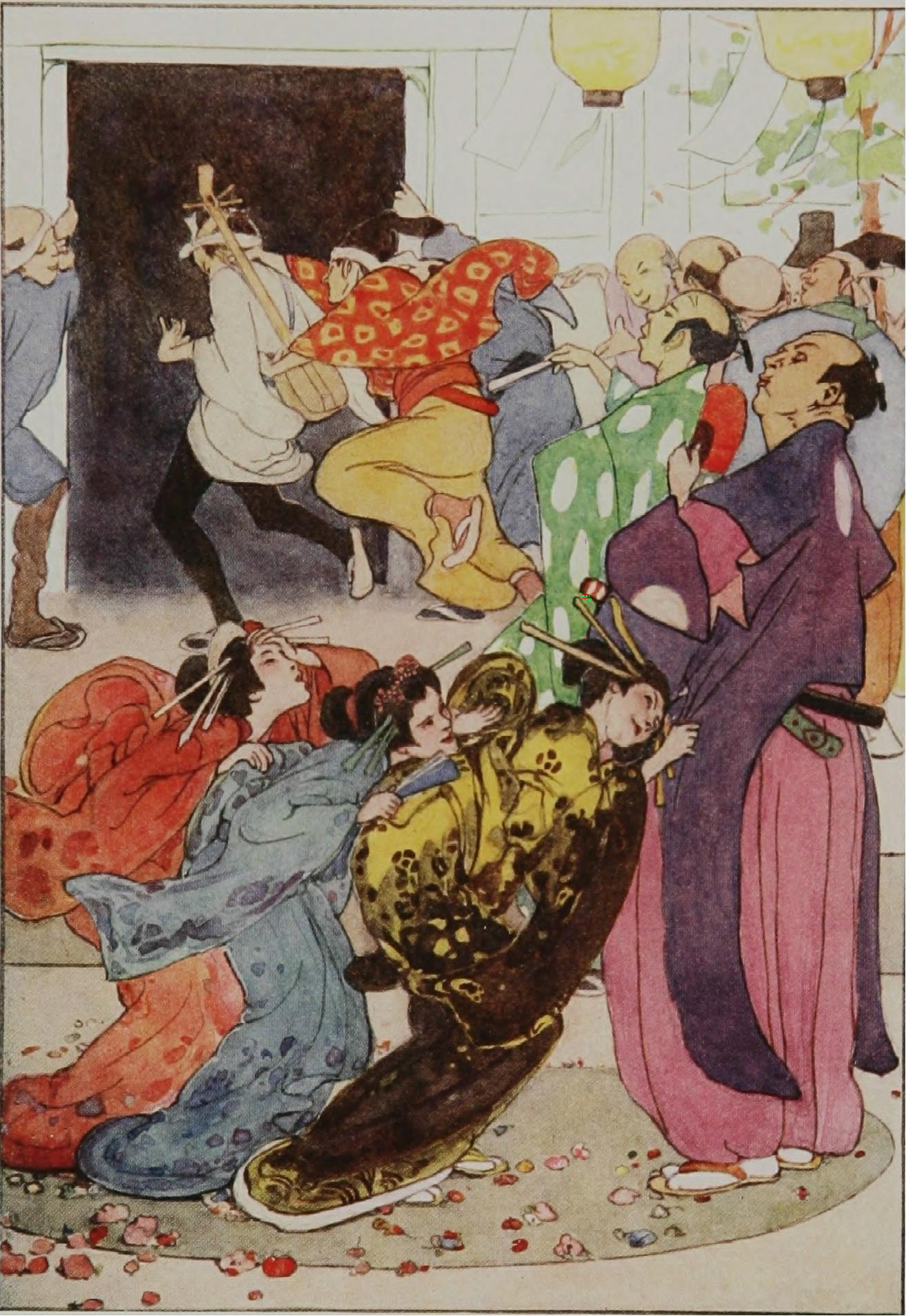
Poo-bah (right), in the comic opera The Mikado, holds many grand titles including First Lord of the Treasury, Master of the Buckhounds, Groom of the Backstairs and Lord High Everything Else.

Job title inflation is the increasing number and size of grandiose job titles in corporations and organisations, without a corresponding increase in pay or an increased importance of the job.

== Purpose ==
Job title inflation is most often used to attract innovation and talent in a workplace or by start-up companies to legitimize their organisation. Job title inflation may be also caused by employers who want to flatter their workers in a way that does not involve an increase in work responsibility or pay. The phenomenon is often used as a form of exploitation of the social value and common associations of a title to artificially increase the importance of a role or position, typically in relation to improving the optics of a company for a prospective client.

== Possible problems ==
Job title inflation is theorized to be detrimental to the performance of an employee. An inflated job title without added responsibility and a pay rise may impact the employee's ability to find employment: similar, uninflated roles at other companies may require qualifications that the employee does not possess. Employees with inflated titles may also be simply unable to perform the task of their counterpart, uninflated role at another company. Research suggests that employers are using job title inflation to cut cost in finding talent; job title inflation is shown to have cut employees of $4 billion in overtime pay.

Companies are believed to be additionally affected by job title inflation—once the inflated title of an employee is vacated, hiring for that same inflated position may be considerably more difficult competing with genuinely compensated market titles.

== See also ==
- Parkinson's law
- Credential inflation of job requirements
- Grade inflation in education
