= Mop bucket cart =

Wheeled bucket for mops

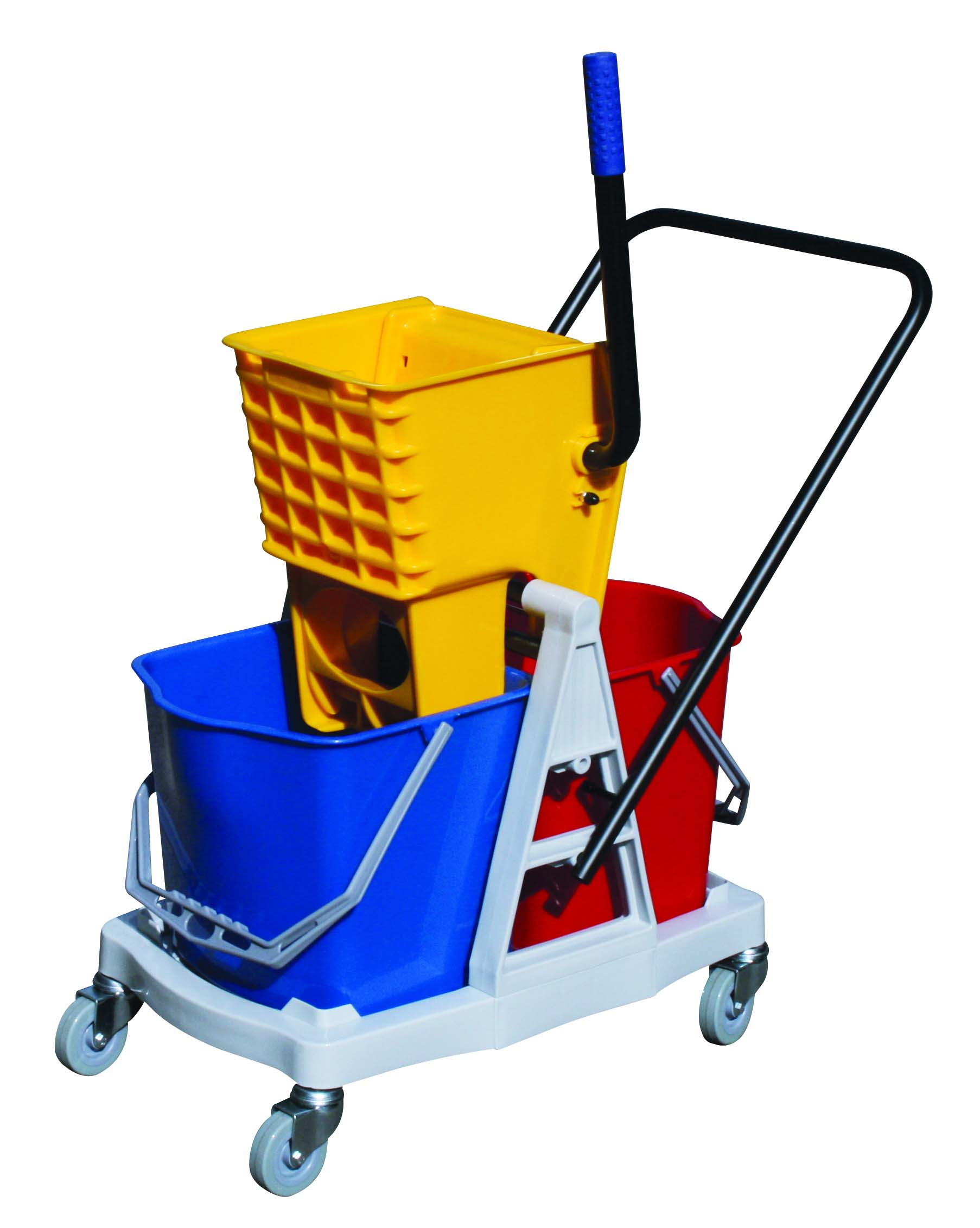
Mop bucket cart

A mop bucket cart (or mop trolley) is a wheeled bucket that allows its user to wring out a wet mop without getting the hands dirty. The cart has two buckets with the upper one usually clipped onto the lower.

The upper bucket is used to place the wet mop for storage and press handle to wring out the mop. Water trickles down to another bucket below, which collects the waste water. In some carts, there are separate lower front bucket to collect waste water. The smaller lower rear bucket is filled with a floor cleaning solution. Wheels are usually present to allow the user to push the cart around using the wring handle bar to steer, allowing complete mobility.

These carts are usually made of heavy duty plastic and usually found in institutional, commercial or industrial settings, but can be used in the home as a more convenient and less dirty tool for cleaning floors.
