= National Occupational Classification =

Canadian classification of occupations

National Occupational Classification Classification nationale des professions
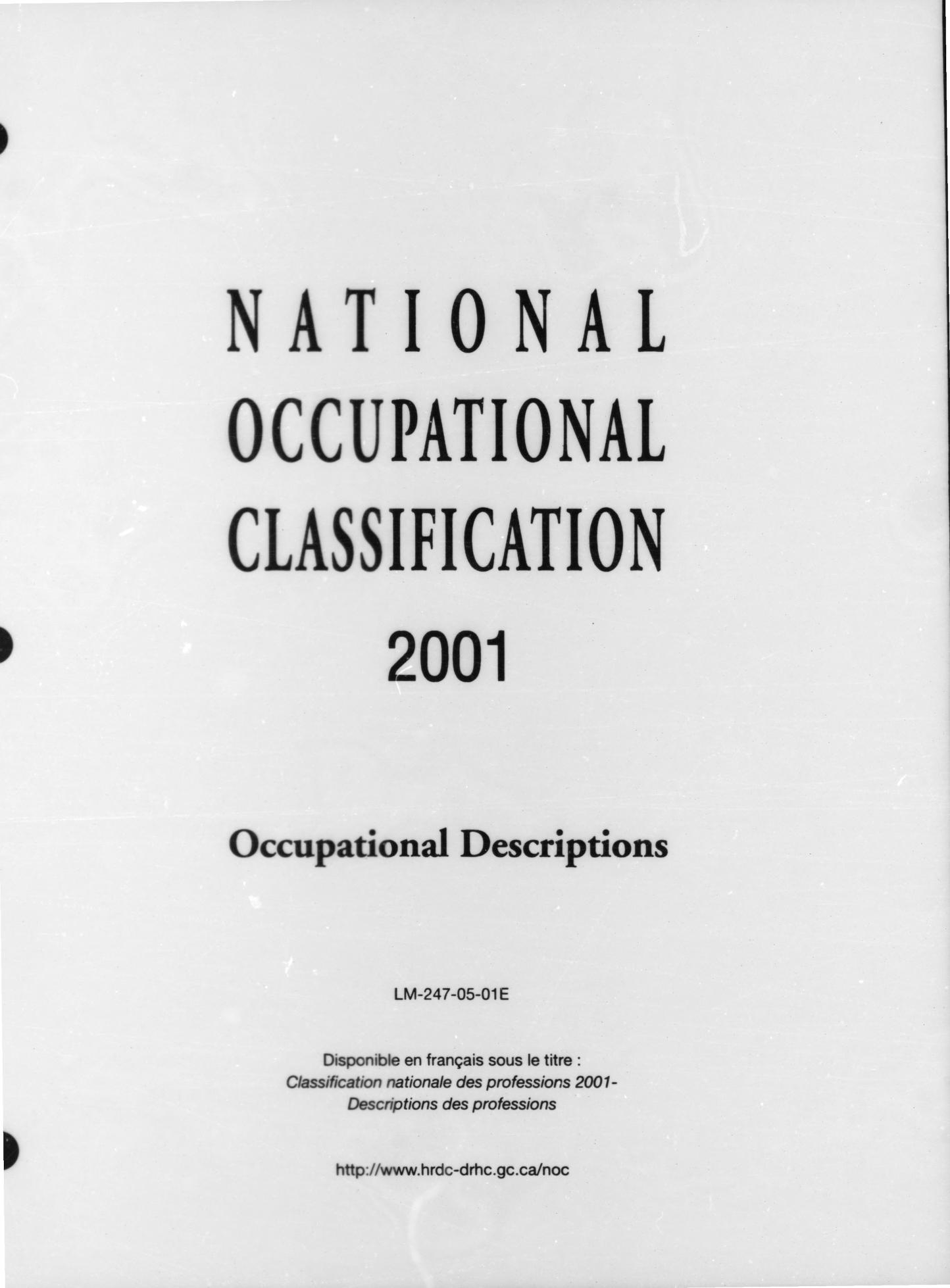
- Title page of the English 2001 edition
- Author: ESDC
- Language: English, French
- Subject: Employment occupations
- Published: 1992, 2001, 2006, 2011, 2018, 2021
- Publication place: Canada
- Media type: Online
- ISBN: 0-660-18377-3

National Occupational Classification, or NOC, is a systematic taxonomy of all occupations in the Canadian labour market. As a Canadian government publication it is concurrently published in French as Classification nationale des professions. The NOC a joint project between Employment and Social Development Canada (ESDC) and Statistics Canada and classifies over 30,000 occupational titles into 500 Unit Groups, organized according to 4 skill levels and 10 skill types.

The NOC is used by students, workers, employers, career and vocational counsellors, educational and training organizations. The first Edition of the NOC was published in 1992, and a Second Revised Edition was offered in 2001. Further minor revisions were made in 2006. The 2011 revision combined the variation National Occupational Classification for Statistics (NOC-S) and the 2006 NOC version into one system with structural changes. The 2016 revision was minor and the NOC content is now continually updated; however its structure is set to be revised every 10 years. It is available online. The 2021 version will be a structural revision.

The NOC supersedes the Canadian Classification Dictionary of Occupations (CCDO), which was published by the then Human Resources and Skills Development Canada (HRSDC) (now ESDC) in 1981.
