= California Center for Population Research =

Academic institution in United States of America

- Established: 1998
- Founders: Robert D. Mare
- Parent institution: University of California, Los Angeles
- Director: Jennie E. Brand
- Location: 337 Charles E Young Dr E, Los Angeles, 90095, United States
- Website: https://ccpr.ucla.edu/

The California Center for Population Research (CCPR) is an interdisciplinary research organization at the University of California, Los Angeles. CCPR supports and fosters innovative and ambitious research and training in demography and population science. CCPR trains the next generation of population scientists to carry out informed research in social, economic, and public health. CCPR seeks deeper understanding of the demographic and social determinants of health and the effects of health on population dynamics and socioeconomic well-being.

== Overview ==
The California Center for Population Research has over 140 faculty researchers representing several schools including the Division of Social Sciences, the UCLA College of Letters and Science, the School of Medicine, and the UCLA Luskin School of Public Affairs. According to the Mission Statement, CPPR aims to train population scientists and deepen understanding of social and demographic determinants of health. Research within CCPR is divided into four major themes:

- Demography of Family, Household, and Individual Well-Being
- Migration and Immigration
- Inequality and Health Disparities
- Fertility and Reproductive Health

Research by CCPR affiliates have been cited in popular media such as the LA Times, Washington Post, the New York Times, and organizations like the Population Council.

== History ==
The California Center for Population Research was founded in 1998 by Robert Mare when he joined the faculty at UCLA in sociology and founded the Center. He also held an appointment in statistics at the time. The current director is Jennie E. Brand, Professor of Sociology and Statistics and co-director of the Center for Social Statistics. Donald Treiman is another founding member of CCPR, and he served as Director 2006-2008. Additional past directors of CCPR include Anne R. Pebley, Judith A. Seltzer, and Duncan Thomas. Pebley, Seltzer, and Mare were all founding members who also served as presidents at the Population Association of America (PAA).

List of past CCPR Directors:

- Martha Bailey (2023 July – Present)
- Jennie Brand (2018 July – 2023 June)
- Judith A. Seltzer (2013 July – 2018 June)
- Anne R. Pebley (2008 July – 2013 June)
- Donald Treiman (2006 July – 2008 June)
- Duncan Thomas (2004 July – 2006 June)
- Robert D. Mare (1998 July – 2004 June)

== Membership ==
Members of CCPR are knowns as affiliates. CCPR is composed of over 200 affiliates (2021). There are four types of membership affiliation:

- Faculty Affiliates
- Faculty Fellows
- Graduate Student Affiliates
- Non-resident Affiliates
