= International Standard Classification of Occupations =

International Labour Organization standard for job names

The International Standard Classification of Occupations (ISCO) is a system developed by the International Labour Organization (ILO) to classify and organize occupations into a structured hierarchy. It serves to facilitate international communication about occupations by providing a framework for statisticians to make internationally comparable occupational data available.

The ILO describes the purpose of the ISCO as:

seek[ing] to facilitate international communication about occupations by providing statisticians with a framework to make internationally comparable occupational data available, and by allowing international occupational data to be produced in a form that can be useful for research as well as for specific decision-making and action-oriented activities.

According to the ILO, a job is defined as "a set of tasks and duties performed, or meant to be performed, by one person, including for an employer or in self-employment." Occupation refers to the kind of work performed in a job, and the concept of occupation is defined as "a set of jobs whose main tasks and duties are characterized by a high degree of similarity." A person may be associated with an occupation through the main job currently held, a second job, a future job, or a job previously held. Skill, in this context, is the ability to carry out the tasks and duties of a job.

The latest version, ISCO-08, was adopted in 2008 and includes four classification levels: major groups, sub-major groups, minor groups, and unit groups. It is widely used for comparative labor market studies, policy development, and international reporting, including within the European Union, the United Nations, and other global institutions.

== History and development ==
The origins of ISCO trace back to the mid-20th century when the need for a global occupational classification system became evident at the First International Conference of Labour Statisticians (ICLS) in 1923. The first complete version, ISCO-58, was adopted in 1957 by the Ninth ICLS and published in 1958, providing a systematic method for grouping occupations to support labor market analysis and facilitate international comparisons. Subsequent revisions, including ISCO-68, ISCO-88, and ISCO-08, refined the classification criteria to reflect changing labor market structures, technological advancements, and evolving job roles. Notably, ISCO-88 marked a major departure from the earlier versions by organizing similar occupations into increasingly larger groups based on skill level and specialization.

ISCO has since been widely adopted by national governments and international organizations to align workforce data with global labor market trends. ISCO has been continuously adapted to ensure its relevance amid shifts in employment patterns, technological progress, and the emergence of new economic sectors. Moreover, its role in international labor statistics enables cross-country comparisons, aiding in policy formulation and economic planning.

The ISCO-08 revision was developed through consultations with national governments, labor organizations, and international experts to ensure relevance and adaptability. Key issues addressed in the ISCO-08 revision included the impact of information and communications technology on the labor market's occupational structure, the need for better representation of health organizations, and the lack of detail in ISCO-88 for clerical and service-related occupations, which are predominantly held by women. Looking ahead, future iterations of ISCO are expected to incorporate new occupational categories reflecting automation, digital transformation, and emerging industries.

The adaptation of ISCO-08 for national use is a critical process to ensure its applicability across diverse labor markets. Countries often modify ISCO-08 to align with national occupational classifications while maintaining international comparability. For instance, the European Union, through the European Skills, Competences, Qualifications and Occupations (ESCO) framework, has built upon ISCO-08 by incorporating more detailed competencies and qualifications for cross-border labor mobility. This adaptation process involves mapping national job structures to ISCO categories, refining classifications to reflect local labor market conditions, and ensuring consistency in data reporting for global labor statistics. Of note, Donald Treiman developed the Standard International Occupational Prestige Scale using the ISCO.

== The ISCO-08 structure ==
ISCO-08 organizes occupations into a four-level hierarchical system:

1. Major Groups (10 broad occupational categories)
2. Sub-Major Groups (43 broader occupational categories within the major groups)
3. Minor Groups (130 more specific job groupings)
4. Unit Groups (436 detailed occupational categories)

The ISCO-08 divides jobs into 10 major groups:

1. Managers
2. Professionals
3. Technicians and associate professionals
4. Clerical support workers
5. Service and sales workers
6. Skilled agricultural, forestry and fishery workers
7. Craft related trades workers
8. Plant and machine operators, and assemblers
9. Elementary occupations
10. Armed forces occupations

=== Major group 1 ===
Managers

- 11 Chief executives, senior officials and legislators
  - 111 Legislators and senior officials
  - 112 Managing directors and chief executives
- 12 Administrative and commercial managers
  - 121 Business services and administration managers
  - 122 Sales, marketing and development managers
- 13 Production and specialized services managers
  - 131 Production managers in agriculture, forestry and fisheries
  - 132 Manufacturing, mining, construction, and distribution managers
  - 133 Information and communications technology service managers
  - 134 Professional services managers
- 14 Hospitality, retail and other services managers
  - 141 Hotel and restaurant managers
  - 142 Retail and wholesale trade managers
  - 143 Other services managers

=== Major group 2 ===
Professionals

- 21 Science and engineering professionals
  - 211 Physical and earth science professionals
  - 212 Mathematicians, actuaries and statisticians
  - 213 Life science professionals
  - 214 Engineering professionals (excluding electrotechnology)
  - 215 Electrotechnology engineers
  - 216 Architects, planners, surveyors and designers
- 22 Health professionals
  - 221 Medical doctors
  - 222 Nursing and midwifery professionals
  - 223 Traditional and complementary medicine professionals
  - 224 Paramedical practitioners
  - 225 Veterinarians
  - 226 Other health professionals
  - 227 Medical Assistant professionals
- 23 Teaching professionals
  - 231 University and higher education teachers
  - 232 Vocational education teachers
  - 233 Secondary education teachers
  - 234 Primary school and early childhood teachers
  - 235 Other teaching professionals
- 24 Business and administration professionals
  - 241 Finance professionals
  - 242 Administration professionals
  - 243 Sales, marketing and public relations professionals
- 25 Information and communications technology professionals
  - 251 Software and applications developers and analysts
  - 252 Database and network professionals
- 26 Legal, social and cultural professionals
  - 261 Legal professionals
  - 262 Librarians, archivists and curators
  - 263 Social and religious professionals
  - 264 Authors, journalists and linguists
  - 265 Creative and performing artists

=== Major group 3 ===
Technicians and associate professionals

- 31 Science and engineering associate professionals
  - 311 Physical and engineering science technicians
  - 312 Mining, manufacturing and construction supervisors
  - 313 Process control technicians
  - 314 Life science technicians and related associate professionals
  - 315 Ship and aircraft controllers and technicians
- 32 Health associate professionals
  - 321 Medical and pharmaceutical technicians
  - 322 Nursing and midwifery associate professionals
  - 323 Traditional and complementary medicine associate professionals
  - 324 Veterinary technicians and assistants
  - 325 Other health associate professionals
- 33 Business and administration associate professionals
  - 331 Financial and mathematical associate professionals
  - 332 Sales and purchasing agents and brokers
  - 333 Business services agents
  - 334 Administrative and specialized secretaries
  - 335 Regulatory government associate professionals
- 34 Legal, social, cultural and related associate professionals
  - 341 Legal, social and religious associate professionals
  - 342 Sports and fitness workers
  - 343 Artistic, cultural and culinary associate professionals
- 35 Information and communications technicians
  - 351 Information and communications technology operations and user support technicians
  - 352 Telecommunications and broadcasting technicians

=== Major group 4 ===
Clerical support workers

- 41 General and keyboard clerks
  - 411 General office clerks
  - 412 Secretaries (general)
  - 413 Keyboard operators
- 42 Customer services clerks
  - 421 Tellers, money collectors and related clerks
  - 422 Client information workers
- 43 Numerical and material recording clerks
  - 431 Numerical clerks
  - 432 Material-recording and transport clerks
- 44 Other clerical support workers
  - 441 Other clerical support workers

=== Major group 5 ===
Service and sales workers

- 51 Personal service workers
  - 511 Travel attendants, conductors and guides
  - 512 Cooks
  - 513 Waiters and bartenders
  - 514 Hairdressers, beauticians and related workers
  - 515 Building and housekeeping supervisors
  - 516 Other personal services workers
- 52 Sales workers
  - 521 Street and market salespersons
  - 522 Shop salespersons
  - 523 Cashiers and ticket clerks
  - 524 Other sales workers
- 53 Personal care workers
  - 531 Child care workers and teachers' aides
  - 532 Personal care workers in health services
- 54 Protective services workers
  - 541 Protective services workers

=== Major group 6 ===
Skilled agricultural, forestry and fishery workers

- 61 Market-oriented skilled agricultural workers
  - 611 Market gardeners and crop growers
  - 612 Animal producers
  - 613 Mixed crop and animal producers
- 62 Market-oriented skilled forestry, fishery and hunting workers
  - 621 Forestry and related workers
  - 622 Fishery workers, hunters and trappers
- 63 Subsistence farmers, fishers, hunters and gatherers
  - 631 Subsistence crop farmers
  - 632 Subsistence livestock farmers
  - 633 Subsistence mixed crop and livestock farmers
  - 634 Subsistence fishers, hunters, trappers and gatherers

=== Major group 7 ===
Craft and related trades workers

- 71 Building and related trades workers, excluding electricians
  - 711 Building frame and related trades workers
  - 712 Building finishers and related trades workers
  - 713 Painters, building structure cleaners and related trades workers
- 72 Metal, machinery and related trades workers
  - 721 Sheet and structural metal workers, moulders and welders, and related workers
  - 722 Blacksmiths, toolmakers and related trades workers
  - 723 Machinery mechanics and repairers
- 73 Handicraft and printing workers
  - 731 Handicraft workers
  - 732 Printing trades workers
- 74 Electrical and electronic trades workers
  - 741 Electrical equipment installers and repairers
  - 742 Electronics and telecommunications installers and repairers
- 75 Food processing, wood working, garment and other craft and related trades workers
  - 751 Food processing and related trades workers
  - 752 Wood treaters, cabinet-makers and related trades workers
  - 753 Garment and related trades workers
  - 754 Other craft and related workers

=== Major group 8 ===
Plant and machine operators and assemblers

- 81 Stationary plant and machine operators
  - 811 Mining and mineral processing plant operators
  - 812 Metal processing and finishing plant operators
  - 813 Chemical and photographic products plant and machine operators
  - 814 Rubber, plastic and paper products machine operators
  - 815 Textile, fur and leather products machine operators
  - 816 Food and related products machine operators
  - 817 Wood processing and papermaking plant operators
  - 818 Other stationary plant and machine operators
- 82 Assemblers
  - 821 Assemblers
- 83 Drivers and mobile plant operators
  - 831 Locomotive engine drivers and related workers
  - 832 Car, van and motorcycle drivers
  - 833 Heavy truck and bus drivers
  - 834 Mobile plant operators
  - 835 Ships' deck crews and related workers

=== Major group 9 ===
Elementary occupations

- 91 Cleaners and helpers
  - 911 Domestic, hotel and office cleaners and helpers
  - 912 Vehicle, window, laundry and other hand cleaning workers
- 92 Agricultural, forestry and fishery labourers
  - 921 Agricultural, forestry and fishery labourers
- 93 Labourers in mining, construction, manufacturing and transport
  - 931 Mining and construction labourers
  - 932 Manufacturing labourers
  - 933 Transport and storage labourers
- 94 Food preparation assistants
  - 941 Food preparation assistants
- 95 Street and related sales and service workers
  - 951 Street and related service workers
  - 952 Street vendors (excluding food)
- 96 Refuse workers and other elementary workers
  - 961 Refuse workers
  - 962 Other elementary workers

=== Major group 10 ===
Armed forces occupations

- 101 Commissioned armed forces officers
  - 1011 Commissioned armed forces officers
- 102 Non-commissioned armed forces officers
  - 1021 Non-commissioned armed forces officers
- 103 Armed forces occupations, other ranks
  - 1031 Armed forces occupations, other ranks

== Methodology ==
=== Collection and coding of occupational data ===
The process of assigning occupational responses to ISCO-08 categories is known as coding, which follows specific guidelines to ensure consistency and accuracy. For precise classification, the following core information is required:

- Job title or occupation name, and
- Main takes or duties performed.

Additional information can enhance coding accuracy, such as:

- The economic activity of the employer or establishment, and
- Whether the activity is primarily for market production or subsistence.

While details about the industry of employment may be useful, they are generally not sufficient for occupational coding on their own. In cases where subsistence farming or fishing plays a major role in a country’s economy, additional data may be collected to distinguish between market-oriented work and own-consumption production. Notably, formal qualifications or skill levels of workers are not always relevant for occupational classification, as individuals often hold qualifications higher or lower than those required for their job. Relying on such information could introduce biases when analyzing the relationship between occupation and education.

=== Types of occupational questions ===
Occupational information is typically collected through national censuses and household surveys using three types of questions:

1. Pre-coded (tick box) questions – Respondents select their job from a list of predefined options (not generally recommended due to limited accuracy).
2. Single write-in question – Individuals describe their occupation in their own words.
3. Two or more write-in questions – These include a job title question followed by a description of main tasks performed, ensuring greater detail and classification accuracy.

In establishment surveys and administrative data collection, job descriptions or duty statements may be coded directly into ISCO-08 categories using official classification indexes.

==== Pre-coded and open-ended questions ====
Pre-coded questions offer quick and cost-effective processing but have limitations. They do not always align with real-world job terminology and often lack the detail needed for effective classification. Although they take up significant space on survey forms, they can be improved through careful refinement of response categories, particularly for high-priority groups.

Open-ended responses provide more detailed and accurate data, allowing for the assignment of a 4-digit ISCO-08 code. However, they require significant effort to process, as responses must be manually coded using occupational title indexes. Despite the cost, this method remains the most reliable way to obtain precise statistical and administrative data. Common open-ended questions include:

- What is the main occupation of this person in the workplace?
- What kind of work does this person do?

While these questions can yield useful responses, they may also generate vague answers like "manager", "consultant", or "farm work", which are difficult to code reliably. When such responses occur, they should be coded to the highest supported level rather than forced into arbitrary categories. For example, "teacher" may be coded as "2300: Teaching Professionals Not Further Defined." Similarly, if only "medical doctor" is provided, it may be classified as "2210: Medical Doctors Not Further Defined."

=== Assigning classification codes to survey responses ===
Assigning classification codes to open-ended survey responses is a complex process, requiring analysis of job titles, tasks, industry, and workplacengesas. To ensure accuracy, three key documents are needed: coding instructions, a coding index, and query resolution procedures. The coding index, available in various formats, helps match responses to ISCO-08 codes, as natural job descriptions often differ from formal classification names. While national coding indexes should reflect local language use, the ISCO-08 Index of Occupational Titles provides a valuable starting point.

== ISCO-08 skill model ==
ISCO-08 classifies skills into two key dimensions:

1. Skill level – The complexity and range of tasks required to perform an occupation, usually linked to educational qualifications or vocational training.
2. Skill specialization – The field of knowledge required, the necessary tools and machinery used, and the specific nature of the work performed.

The ISCO-08 skill levels correspond to the International Standard Classification of Education (ISCED-97) groups as follows:

- Skill Level 1: Corresponds to primary education (ISCED-97 Level 1) and lower secondary education (ISCED-97 Level 2).
- Skill Level 2: Corresponds to upper secondary education (ISCED-97 Level 3) and post-secondary non-tertiary education (ISCED-97 Level 4).
- Skill Level 3: Corresponds to the first stage of tertiary education (ISCED-97 Level 5B), which includes vocational education and training.
- Skill Level 4: Corresponds to the first and second stages of tertiary education (ISCED-97 Levels 5A and 6), which includes university degrees and advanced research qualifications.

Skill level is typically assigned at the ISCO Major Group level, except for Major Group 1: Managers and Major Group 0: Armed Forces Occupations, where it is primarily applied at the second hierarchical level (Sub Major Group level). Within each major group, organizing occupations into sub-major, minor, and unit groups is mainly based on skill specialization.

== Comparison with other classification systems ==
ISCO is one of several major occupational classification systems used worldwide. Other prominent systems include the U.S. Standard Occupational Classification (SOC), the European Skills, Competences, Qualifications and Occupations (ESCO), and national classification systems used in various countries.

- U.S. Standard Occupational Classification (SOC): Developed by the U.S. Bureau of Labor Statistics, the SOC system categorizes occupations based on work performed and required skills. Unlike ISCO, which is designed for international comparisons, SOC is tailored for national employment analysis and policy-making in the U.S.
- European Skills, Competences, Qualifications and Occupations (ESCO): Managed by the European Commission, ESCO provides a more detailed classification system incorporating skills and qualifications. ESCO is linked to ISCO but includes a greater focus on skills mapping, making it particularly useful for workforce development and mobility within the EU.
- National Occupational Classification (NOC): Used in Canada, NOC aligns with ISCO but reflects country-specific labor market trends, industry demands, and workforce regulations.
- Occupational Information Network (O*NET): O*NET is a U.S.-specific system developed by the Department of Labor, offering detailed information on a wide range of occupations, including skills, knowledge, and abilities. The Institute for Structural Research created a "crosswalk" from O*NET to ISCO-88 and ISCO-08 coding (O*NET has official crosswalks to SOC and ESCO). Regarding skill models, both systems aim to capture the skills required for various occupations. However, O*NET provides a much more granular and comprehensive analysis of skills, including detailed ratings of their importance and level, while ISCO-08 focuses more on broader occupational categories.

== Criticisms and limitations ==
ISCO is widely used for categorizing jobs across different sectors and countries. However, it has been subject to various criticisms and limitations. One major criticism is the challenge of cross-national comparability. Studies indicate that occupational titles coded under ISCO-08 often vary significantly between countries, raising concerns about the consistency and reliability of classifications. A study found that only 64% of job titles retained the same ISCO-08 4-digit code across multiple countries, highlighting inconsistencies in occupational classification.

Evolving occupational characteristics have also posed challenges to ISCO, which relies on task similarity, duties, and required skills. Factors such as working conditions (including hours, schedules, and remote work) and the work environment (encompassing safety, health considerations, and workplace interpersonal networks) significantly influence occupational categorization.

Moreover, the ISCO framework, which consists of at least ten major occupational groups, is often difficult to apply in small-scale workforce studies or in reporting partial workforce data. As a result, professionals frequently use modified classification systems tailored to specific contexts, such as distinctions between manual and non-manual labor, white- and blue-collar jobs, office-based and outdoor work, or knowledge-based and physical labor.

The ISCO has been criticized for its broad categorization, which can group together jobs with significant differences in tasks, skills, and working conditions. For instance, the ISCO-88 version was noted to have excessive detail in some areas, such as plant and machinery operators, while providing inadequate detail in others, like service-related occupations and those prevalent in the informal sector. Additionally, there was a wide variation in the size of some sub-major and minor groups.

== See also ==
- HISCO - Historical International Standard of Classification of Occupations
- International Standard Industrial Classification – United Nations industry classification system
- International Statistical Classification of Diseases and Related Health Problems – International standard diagnostic tool
- International Standard Classification of Education – Education levels
- National Occupational Classification – Canadian classification of occupations (of Canada)
- Standard Occupational Classification System – United States government system (of the United States)
- Job title inflation – Phenomenon of increasingly grandiose job titles in organisations
