= Sociological Research Association =

American sociology honor society

The Sociological Research Association is an honor society of sociological scholars founded in 1936.

It was founded in the 1930s in opposition to the dominant Chicago school of sociology. And in the late 1960s, it was seen by some as a counterweight to the radical and anti-empirical activity of some leading sociologists.

== Sources ==
- Robert C. Banister (1991). Sociology and Scientism: The American Quest for Objectivity, 1880-1940. Chapel Hill: University of North Carolina Press, 1991.
- "Current Items" (1936). American Sociological Review, 1(4): 650-651
- [Statement by American Sociological Review Editorial Board about the new Sociological Research Association.] (December 1936)." Editorial Notes." American Sociological Review, 1(6): 967–968.
- https://www.sociological-research-assoc.org/
