= Julia Rodríguez-Maribona =

Spanish nurse and inventor

Julia Rodríguez-Maribona (November 12, 1923, in Avilés – March 16, 2005, in Neuchâtel) was a Spanish nurse, who was considered the inventor of the mop, along with her mother Julia Montoussé Fargues.

== Inventing the Mop ==
Rodríguez was born in Avilés in 1923. Her parents were Julia Montoussé and the industrialist, José Maribona. In the 1980s, she emigrated to Switzerland where she met her second husband, Albert, and worked as a nurse. She died of leukemia in the Swiss city of Neuchatel on March 16, 2005 without descendants. She and Albert's ashes were interred in Spain.

Rodríguez and her mother designed a cleaning device that combined a bucket, stick and rag, which later became known as a mop. In 1953 they acquired the utility model (a type of right that is granted to an invention and that prevents third parties from commercially using the protected invention, without authorization) No. 34,262, with the title "Device attachable to any class of containers such as buckets, buckets, cauldrons and the like, to facilitate the scrubbing, washing and drying of floors, floors, corridors, skirting boards and premises in general".

The design was later acquired by the Manufacturas Rodex household goods factory, from the engineer Manuel Jalón. He was looking for a round wringer and mop system, and developed it by improving the invention of Julia and Julina. Manuel was granted sole recognition for the invention by patent number 298,240 eleven years later in 1964. Rodríguez and Montoussé are still not recognized as inventors of the mop due to the legal difference between utility model and invention patent.
