= Floor cleaning =

Occupation

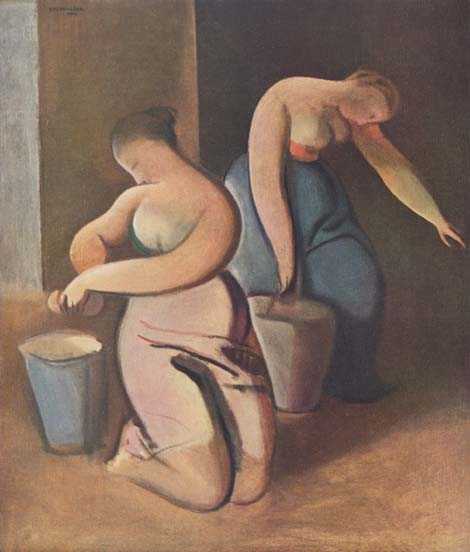
Swabbing by Rudolf Kremlička

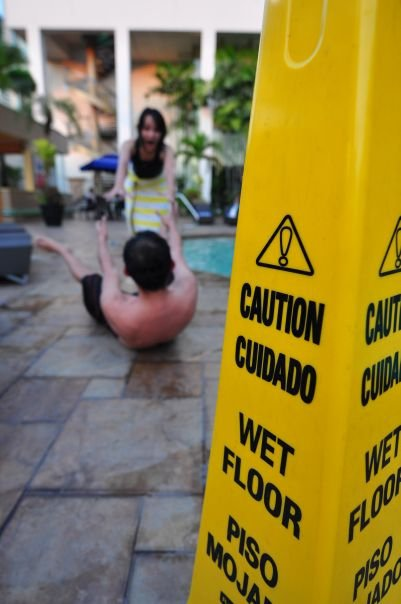
A wet floor sign

Floor cleaning is a major occupation throughout the world. The main job of most cleaners is to clean floors.

== Reasons for cleaning floors ==
The principal reasons for floor cleaning are:

- To prevent injuries due to tripping or slipping. Injuries due to slips and trips on level floors are a major cause of accidental injury or death. Bad practice in floor cleaning is itself a major cause of accidents.
- To beautify the floor.
- To remove stains, dirt, litter and obstructions.
- To remove grit and sand which scratch and wear down the surface.
- To remove allergens, in particular dust.
- To remove sick building syndrome.
- To prevent wear to the surface (e.g. by using a floor wax or protective sealant).
- To make the environment sanitary (e.g. in kitchens).
- To reduce ingestion/inhalation rates of microplastics.
- To maintain an optimum traction (e.g. for dance floors).
- Reduce workload in between shifts (e.g. dedicated cleaning crew).

== Methods of floor cleaning ==
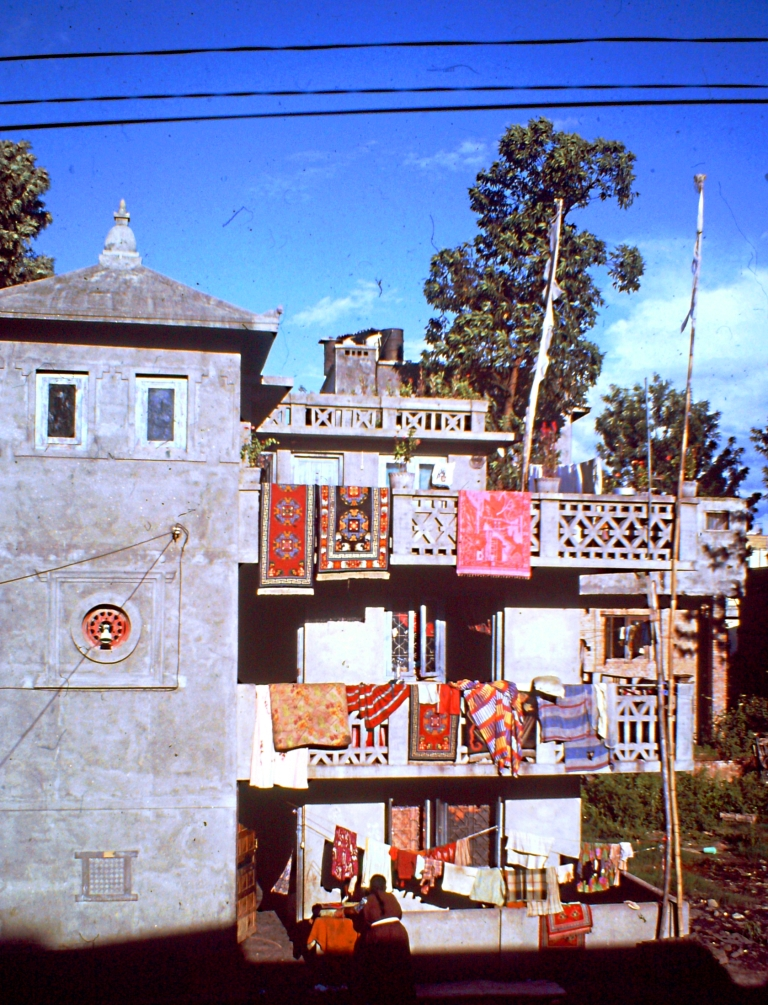
Carpets cleaned and hung out to air. Kathmandu, 1979

The treatment needed for different types of floors is very different.

Slipping is a common safety hazard for cleaning methods that involve water or other liquids, especially if the floor is left wet.

Sawdust is used on some floors to absorb any liquids that fall rather than trying to prevent them being spilt. The sawdust is swept up and replaced each day. This was common in the past in pubs and is still used in some butchers and fishmongers.

It used to be common to use tea leaves to collect dirt from carpets and remove odours.

There are also a wide variety of floor cleaning machines available today such as floor buffers, automatic floor scrubbers and sweepers, and carpet extractors that can deep clean almost any type of hard floor or carpeted flooring surface in much less time than it would take using a traditional cleaning method.

=== Wood flooring ===
Different types of wood flooring may require completely different care depending on whether they are waxed, oiled or have a polyurethane coating. It is important to determine the type of finish of a wood floor and always treat it in the proper manner, for instance it is difficult to clear wood floor wax from a floor coated with polyurethane. Simple cleaning instructions:

1. Clear the floor of any furniture that is easy to move.
2. Sweep or vacuum all loose dirt and debris.
3. Mop the floor, going along with the grain. For a polyurethane coated floor, dampen a mop with water and a few drops of dishwashing liquid. Be sure to ring out the mop thoroughly before using it on the floor. Run the mop back and forth, going with the grain of the wood in smooth strokes. Do not use water for lacquered or shellacked floors, as it can stain the wood and cause buckling.
4. Buff the floor with a soft cloth to remove any soapy residue. Cloth diapers work well for buffing since they are very soft and absorbent.

=== Tile and stone ===
Tile and stone flooring is common in kitchens, stairs, and bathrooms. Its cleaning process can be divided into three steps:

1. Dirt or dust should first be removed with a vacuum cleaner or a broom.
2. Have a floor cleaning solution or spray bottle for the appropriate floor. If you are cleaning stone floors (marble, granite, travertine, etc.), make sure the cleaning agent states that it is for stones. An acidic tile cleaning solution can be used on ceramic and porcelain floors
3. After spraying the tile or stone floors in a small area, use a mop to clean and scrub floors. Then wipe it with dry cloth.

=== Vinyl composition tile ===
Vinyl composition tile or VCT is a common commercial floor type. Cleaning this type of floor is done with either a mop and bucket or with a floor scrubber.

VCT requires a polymer coating or floor finish to protect it. This needs to be kept clean with dust mopping and wet cleaning (i.e. wet mopping or floor scrubber).

=== Cleaning agents ===
For cleaning floors, when a type of floor wiper is used, liquid cleaning agents are usually added to the water that is used with it. The product used may also depend on the floor-type such as parquet or tiles as some products can damage the floor.

One study found that floor cleaners whose formulation includes certain monoterpenes can cause indoor levels of air pollution equivalent to or exceeding respiratory harm compared to time spent near busy roads.

== Reducing the need for cleaning ==
A well-maintained entrance matting can dramatically reduce the need for cleaning. For public and office buildings, about 80 to 90% of the dirt is tracked in from outside. Installing a total of 15 feet of matting consisting of both indoor and outdoor sections will remove about 80% of this. Thus, about two-thirds of the dirt can be removed at the entrance.

== See also ==
- Carpet cleaning
- Floor buffer
- Floor scrubbers
- Scrubber (brush)
- Spray-and-vac cleaning
- Terminal cleaning
