= Scrubber (brush) =

Wide brush with a long shaft used for cleaning hard surfaces

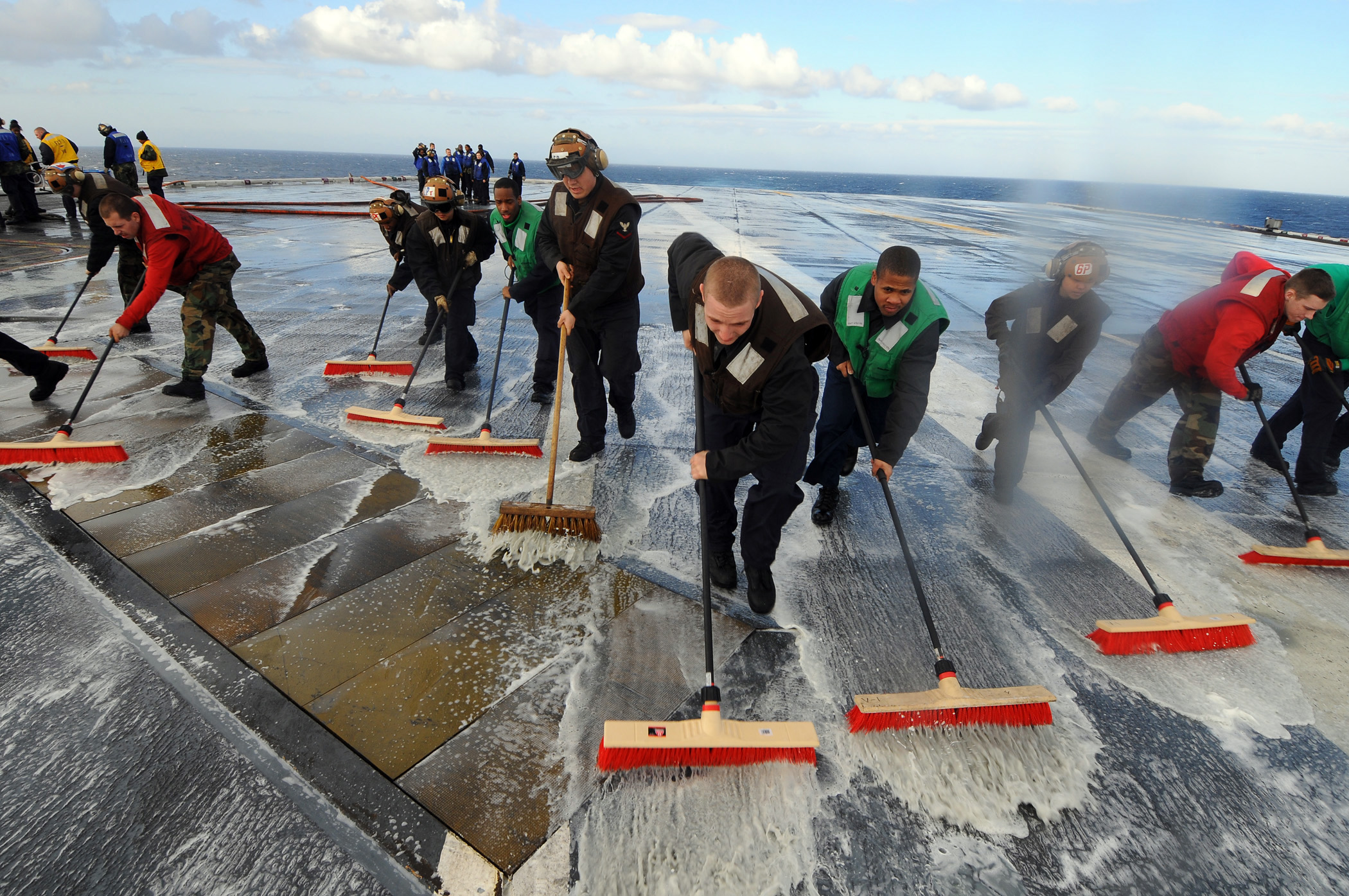
Sailors scrubbing the deck on the USS Dwight D. Eisenhower

A scrubber (German: Schrubber), is a type of wide brush with a long shaft used for cleaning hard floors or surfaces. Unlike a broom, which has soft bristles to sweep dirt away, a scrubber has hard bristles for brushing. It may therefore be used wet, with water or cleaning fluids. Around the head of the brush there may also be a removable floorcloth or mop, either soaked in water for cleaning or dry for wiping dry. However, these days other cleaning implements tend to be used for such purposes.

In North Germany and in sailor's language, a scrubber is also called a Leuwagen, hence in large firms or offices a cleaning party is sometimes jokingly called a Leuwagenballett ("scrubber ballet").

== See also ==
- Automatic floor scrubber
- Floor cleaning
