= Julia Montoussé Fargues =

Spanish inventor

Julia Montoussé Fargues (born 1893, died 27 September 1971 in Avilés) was a Spanish (Catalan) inventor of French origin, considered the inventor of the mop, alongside her daughter Julia Rodríguez-Maribona. However, neither invented the original concept of the mop. Although other patents had been filed for products related to the mop (such as Jacob Howe, who filed a patent for a mop holder), she is regarded as the inventor of the modern mop, in 1953, something that would later be drastically improved.

== Invention of the mop ==
Julia Montoussé Fargues, along with her daughter, Julia, (Rodríguez-Maribona) invented the mop, and filed a patent, along with obtaining utility model number 34,262. This would be a massive step for their new invention, as this allowed them to accurately define their new product, along with restricting other large corporations in their manufacturing of the mop. The mop was described as a "device attachable to all kinds of containers such as buckets, pails, cauldrons and the like, to facilitate the scrubbing, washing and drying of floors, walkways, baseboards and premises in general." They applied for the patent on June 19, 1953, and it was accepted on August 1st of the same year. Eleven years later, the design was acquired by the household goods factory Manufacturas Rodex, owned by engineer Manuel Jalón, one of the later people to mass produce and improve the mop. Manuel is often mistakenly credited with the invention.
