= Propane burnisher =

A propane burnisher is a type of rotary floor burnisher, a floor buffing (polishing) device, that is powered by propane. It is designed to rotate in speeds in excess of 1200-1800 RPM. It typically has a series of interchangeable pads that promote the cleaning, along with different types of abrasives and solvents available to buff the floor to a shine.
