= Manuel Jalón Corominas =

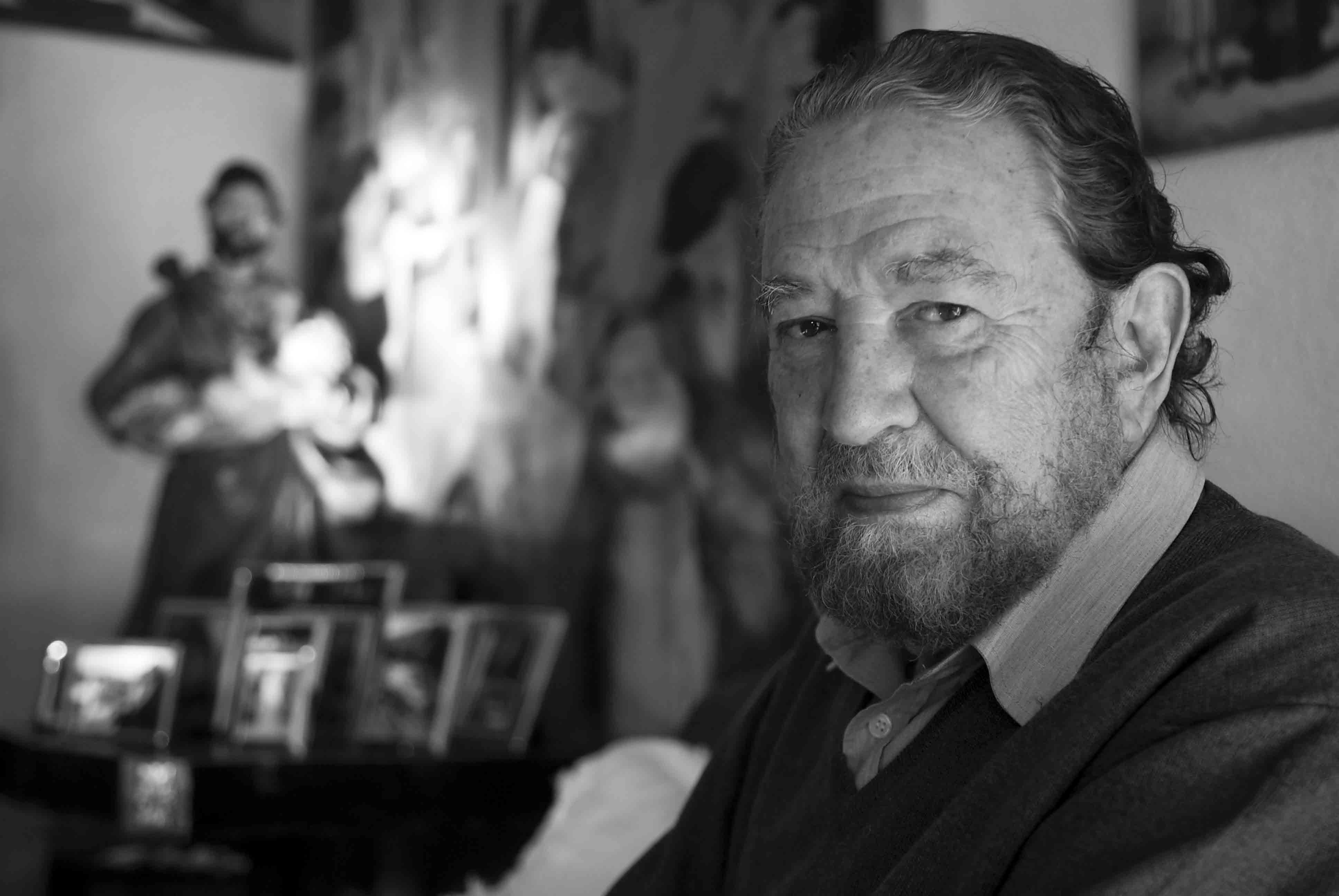
- Born: 31 January 1925; Logroño, Spain
- Died: 16 December 2011 (aged 86); Zaragoza, Spain
- Citizenship: Spanish
- Known for: inventing the modern mop and the disposable hypodermic syringe

Manuel Jalón Corominas (Logroño, 31 January 1925 – Zaragoza, 16 December 2011) was a Spanish air force officer, aeronautical engineer, inventor, and entrepreneur. He was awarded patents for improvements to the mop and the disposable syringe.

== Biography ==
Born in Logroño, Manuel Jalón Corominas spent most of his life in Zaragoza. He studied aeronautical engineering in Madrid and completed a doctoral thesis about aeronautical accidents. Following his graduation he spent some time working in the US and in Finland, and for a while he was an officer in the Spanish Air Force at the air base of Zaragoza.

He died of cardiopulmonary arrest on 16 December 2011 in Zaragoza at age 86. A year before his death he published an autobiographical book titled "Manual para la otra vida" (Manual for the next life).

== Contributions ==
=== The mop and bucket ===
During his stay in the US at the Chanute Air Force Base, Jalón observed how hangars were cleaned using a flat mop and a bucket with rollers. He brought this idea back to Spain, where he launched the manufacture of a new design of 'floorcleaners' and buckets with rollers. This design was an improvement upon existing American models, adapted to the Spanish market.

In 1958 he founded Manufacturas Rodex, S.A., which obtained patents and adopted the brand name "Rodex" (first registered in 1956). Corominas persuaded Catalan entrepreneurs to invest in his business, in particular Buenaventura and Domingo Rull of the Lleida company Casa Rull, who became sole distributors of Rodex products in Catalonia. Jalón remained as chief executive of the company for over 30 years, and his early co-workers Enrique Falcón Morellón and Emilio Bellvis Montesano also became shareholders. Jalón exported his products, the mop particularly, to more than 40 countries, from the United States to China.

==== Legal claims about invention of the mop ====
Although some sort of mop has existed for centuries, refinements and variations have been introduced from time to time. For example, American inventor Jacob Howe received U.S. patent #241 for a mop holder in 1837 and Thomas W. Stewart (U.S. patent #499,402) in 1893. Between 1957 and 1958, Manuel Jalón submitted utility models 57.190 and 60.301 for intellectual property on a metal cube incorporating a mechanism with two rollers. In 1964 he obtained an invention patent for "Improvements in compression dryer systems". Some of the novelty claims in this patent were:

- The dryer was composed of a single piece, made by plastic injection molding.
- The introduction of slots to serve as draining channels.
- The gradually-closing shape of the dryer, with a round end.

Due to these improvements and the commercial success of the mop sold by his company, Manuel Jalon Corominas is known, mainly in Spain, as the "inventor of the mop".

Intellectual property claims over the mop were challenged by his former associate Emilio Bellvis Montesano. This legal controversy ended in 2008 when a Zaragoza tribunal ruled in Jalón's favor.

=== The disposable syringe ===
In 1989, after more than 60 million mops had been sold around the world, the company stocks were sold to the Dutch multinational Curver BV. After this, Jalón worked on other designs, notably improvements on the disposable syringe, which was also a success. His model had a plunger less prone to stick, made of plastic instead of glass, and with thin walls making disposal easier. They were first produced by the Fabersanitas factory at Fraga (Huesca province) and were exported to over 80 countries. The factory was later bought by the Becton Dickinson group.

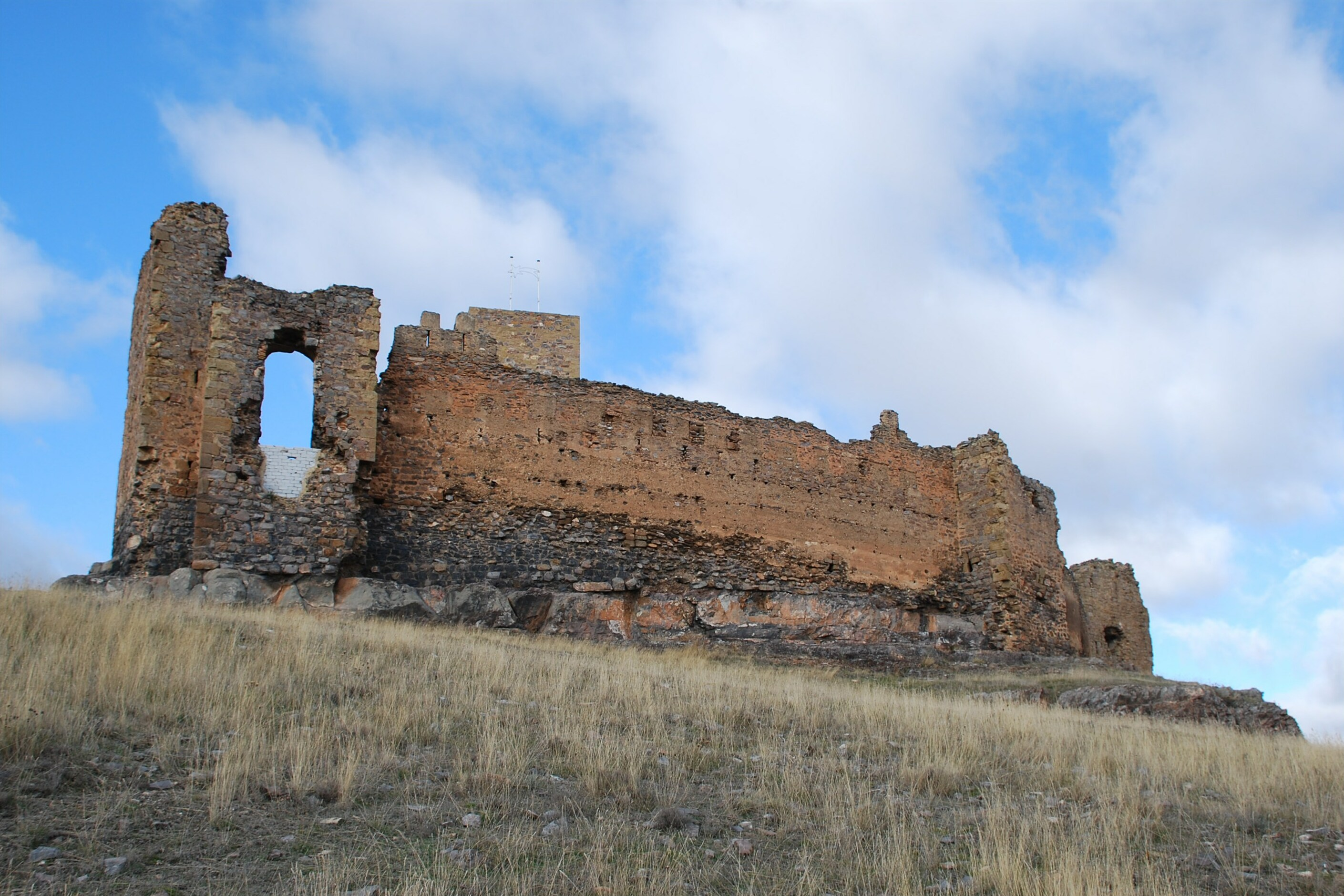
Trasmoz castle

== Trasmoz castle ==
Manuel Jalón Corominas had a long association with the Aragonese village of Trasmoz, where he purchased the ruins of a medieval castle and partially rebuilt it. Today the castle houses the "Museum of Witchery". In 2004 Manuel Jalón published the book "The dark legend of Trasmoz" about the town's legends of witchcraft.

== Honours and awards ==
In 1991, the local government of Zaragoza granted Jalón their highest business award, the Salduba prize. In 1992 he was named "favourite son" of the City of Zaragoza. The same year he was also named 'Riojano of the year' by popular vote. In 2011 a bronze sculpture to the mop was built near the castle of Trasmoz by sculptor Luigi Maraez, in order to honor Jalón's most famous contribution.

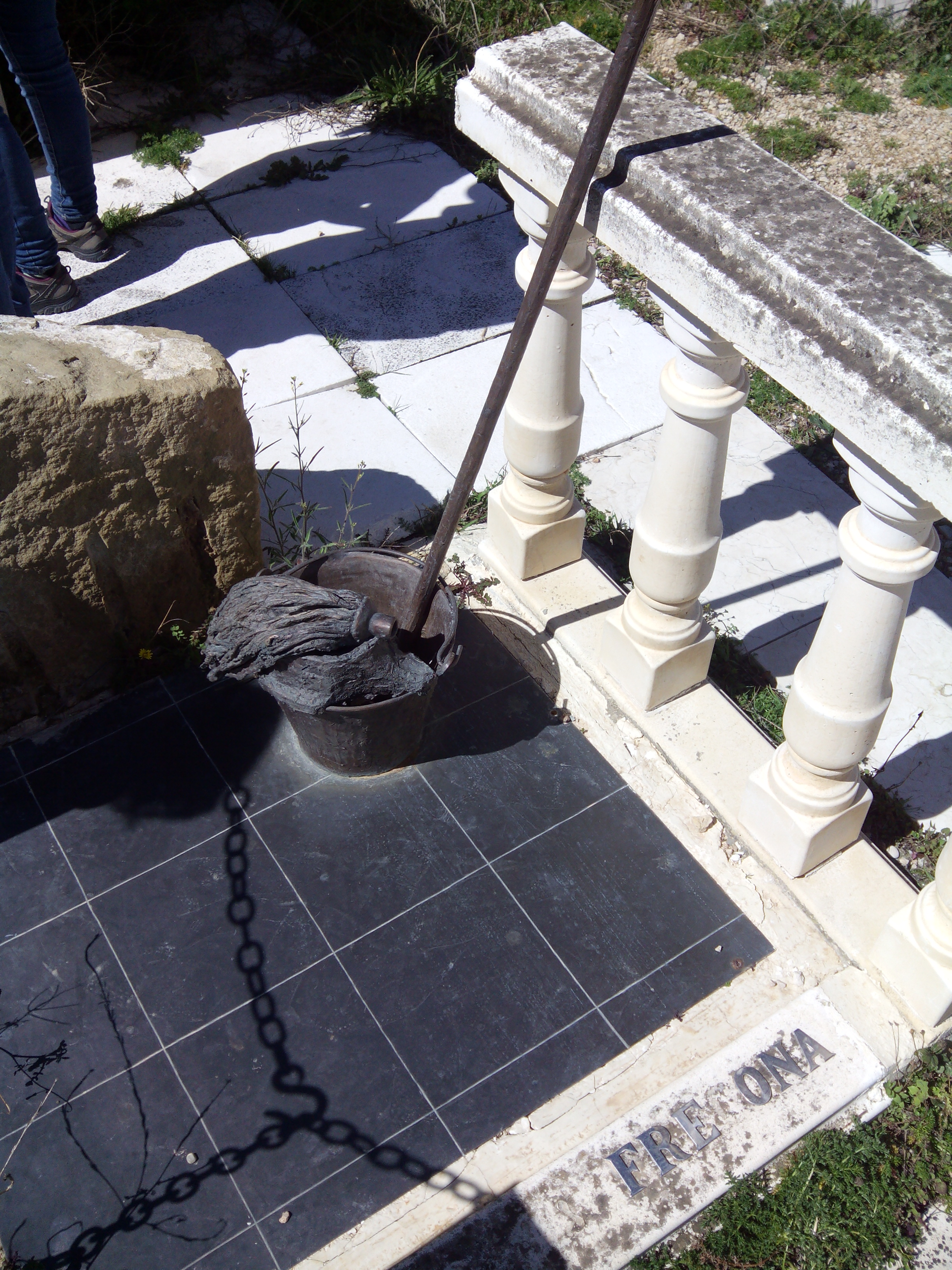
Monument to the mop in Trasmoz
