= Floor scrubber =

Floor cleaning device

Sam's Club autonomous floor scrubber and inventory scanner

A floor scrubber is a floor cleaning device. It can be a simple tool such as a floor mop or floor brush, or in the form of a walk-behind or a ride-on machine to clean larger areas by injecting water with cleaning solution, scrubbing, and lifting the residue off the floor. With advancements in robotics, autonomous floor-scrubbing robots are available as well.

== Automatic floor scrubbers ==
Automatic floor scrubbers, also known as auto scrubbers, are a type of floor cleaning machine that are used to scrub a floor clean of light debris, dust, oil, grease or floor marks. These machines have either a rotary (disk) or cylindrical scrubbing head and an automated system for dispensing cleaning solution and then vacuuming it up. So, in one pass over the floor, a user can dispense a cleaning agent, scrub it into the floor, then vacuum it all up with an autoscrubber squeegee attached at the back of the machine. Auto scrubbers have a separate dispensing (solution) tank and collection (recovery) tank to keep the clean water separate from the dirty water and can be categorized into one of three main types: walk behind, stand-on, and rider.

Floor scrubbers are a more hygienic alternative to traditional cleaning methods such as a mop and bucket. Environmentally safe soaps can be used in conjunction with a reduced water system to save on both the amount of chemicals released into the environment as well as the amount of gray water produced. Some scrubbers are even capable of cleaning without a water and chemical system at all.

Most autoscrubbers cannot reach edges, corners, clean under obstructions such as drinking fountains, and cannot fit into alcoves. Therefore, mopping is needed to clean areas the autoscrubber cannot reach. Some manufacturers now produce floor scrubbers with orbital or oscillating brush decks, allowing edges, corners and overhangs to be fully cleaned.

Modern floor scrubbers have a pre-sweep option that removes the need to sweep the floor before scrubbing. The pre-sweep brush head is placed in front of the vacuum system to collect dust and debris before it can block the vacuum system. In the past it was important to sweep the floor before scrubbing to remove any debris and dust that could clog the vacuum hose or build up in the vacuum motor, which can decrease performance. If this happens, the hose may need to be removed to clear the obstruction and/or the motor may need to be blown out with compressed air.

Stripping solution should never be used as it can cause damage to the solution dispensing system, but can still be vacuumed up by the machine without harm. Occasionally, the solution system should be flushed with water mixed with vinegar to remove any soap and calcium deposits that could build in the solution system.

After each use, the dispensing (solution) and especially the collection (recovery) tanks should be emptied and rinsed out to prevent dirt build up. The pads/brushes, vacuum hose, and squeegee should also be rinsed to prevent dirt buildup. The motor should be run for several minutes afterwards to remove any moisture that could be present in the motor to reduce chances of corrosion that could damage the vac motor. Failure to do this maintenance can result in a loss of vacuum airflow and increase in costly repairs.

=== Types of heads ===
There are three common types of automatic floor scrubber heads: disk, cylindrical, and square oscillating.

Disk style floor scrubbers, the most common type, use a circular motion with a round pad or brush to agitate a cleaning solution against the floor to release soils. Disk floor scrubber heads work best on smooth floors.

Using counter-rotating, tube-style brushes that rotate perpendicular to the floor, cylindrical floor scrubbers clean rough or uneven surfaces. Cylindrical brushes usually have a collection tray behind the brushes that can pick up larger debris such as rocks and screws. This reduces the need to sweep or dust mop prior to scrubbing, although it is still a good idea if possible.

Similar to the disk style, square oscillating floor scrubbers use a flat pad to scrub the floor. The difference is that instead of spinning, it moves in a vibrating motion at a much faster speed. The square design allows for cleaning closer to walls and in corners.

The high speed motion and down pressure also allow this style of floor scrubber head to be useful for removing floor finish from vinyl composite tile and well as prepare wood floors for refinishing. A specialized abrasive pad is used for these procedures.

== Floor buffers and polishers ==
Floor buffer

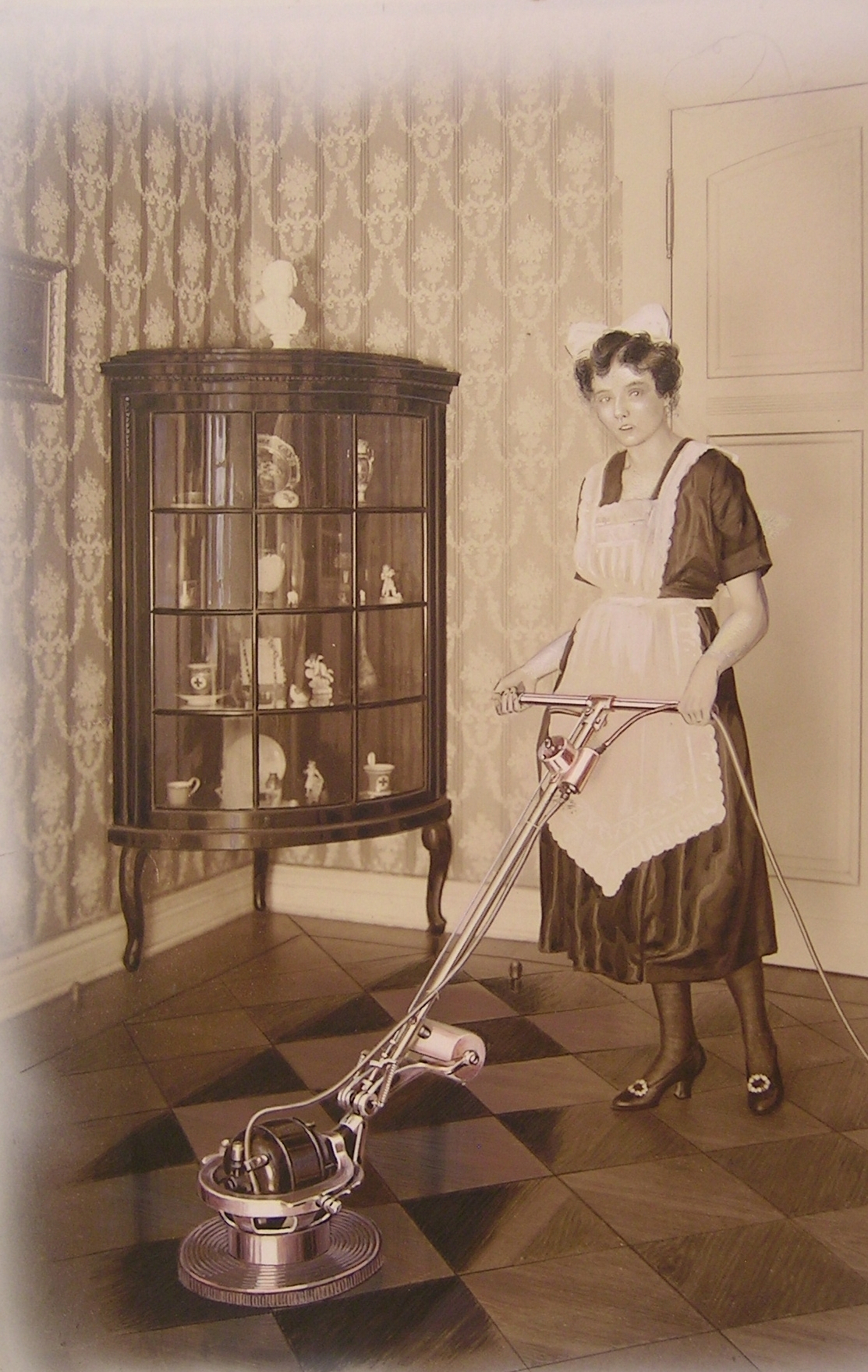
Floor polishing machine from 1912

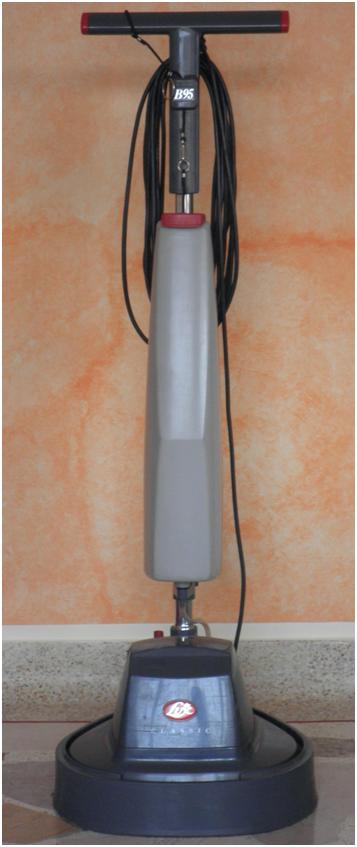
Floor polishing machine brand Lux

When floor scrubbing machines became more available to many types of facilities, there was a need to cover a different type of flooring. Floor buffers or rotary floor machines use rotary brushes of a soft material to clean, scrub, and polish linoleum surfaces. For marble and wood floors, floor polishers may be used to apply protective coating to the floor.

Floor burnisher is the term for a high speed floor buffer that rotates its pad at over 1000 RPM.

Closely resembling a large upright, wide-based vacuum cleaner with handlebar controls, a floor buffer uses one or more variable-speed circular rotary brushes to dislodge dirt and dust from and apply a polished finish to flat surfaces. They have a large, round scrubbing pad which is spun in one direction by a small motor, usually mounted directly over the center of the pad.

Larger powered floor buffers are used in schools, hospitals, offices and public buildings. These have wheels and are powered to allow the user to easily move and clean items stuck on floors. Scaled-down versions are available for home use and often sold as hard floor cleaners.

== Floor-scrubbing robots ==
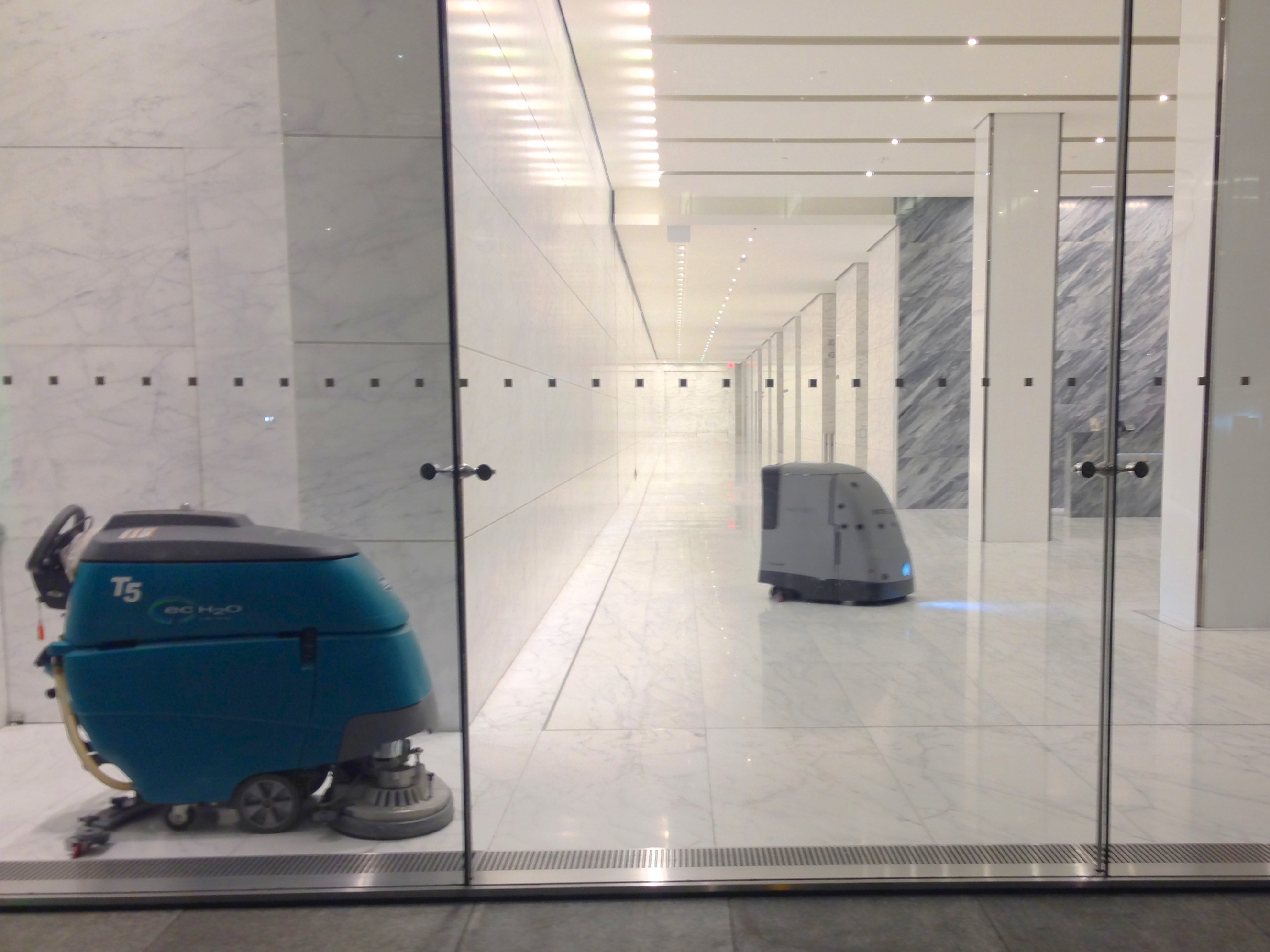
T5 walk-behind floor scrubber by Tennant (left) and HydroBot floor-scrubbing robot by Intellibot Robotics (right)

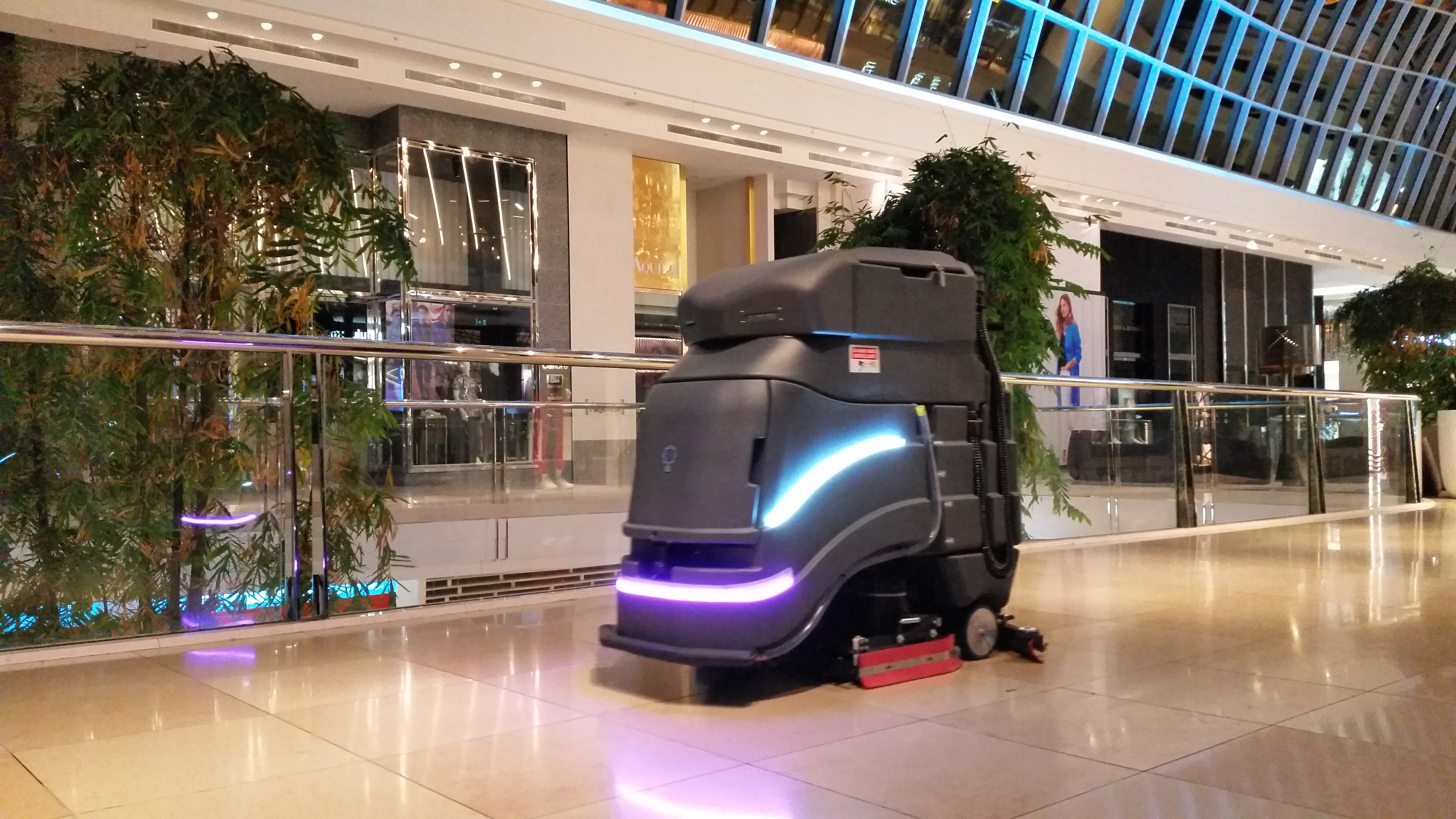
Avidbots Neo floor scrubber autonomously cleaning a shopping center

=== Residential ===
Floor-scrubbing robots are also available in a small form factor for residential applications. The Scooba by iRobot was an early example but is no longer manufactured.

== See also ==
- Floor cleaning
- Propane burnisher
- Scrubber (brush)
- Street sweeper
