= Trasmoz =

Trasmoz, Spain
- Municipality
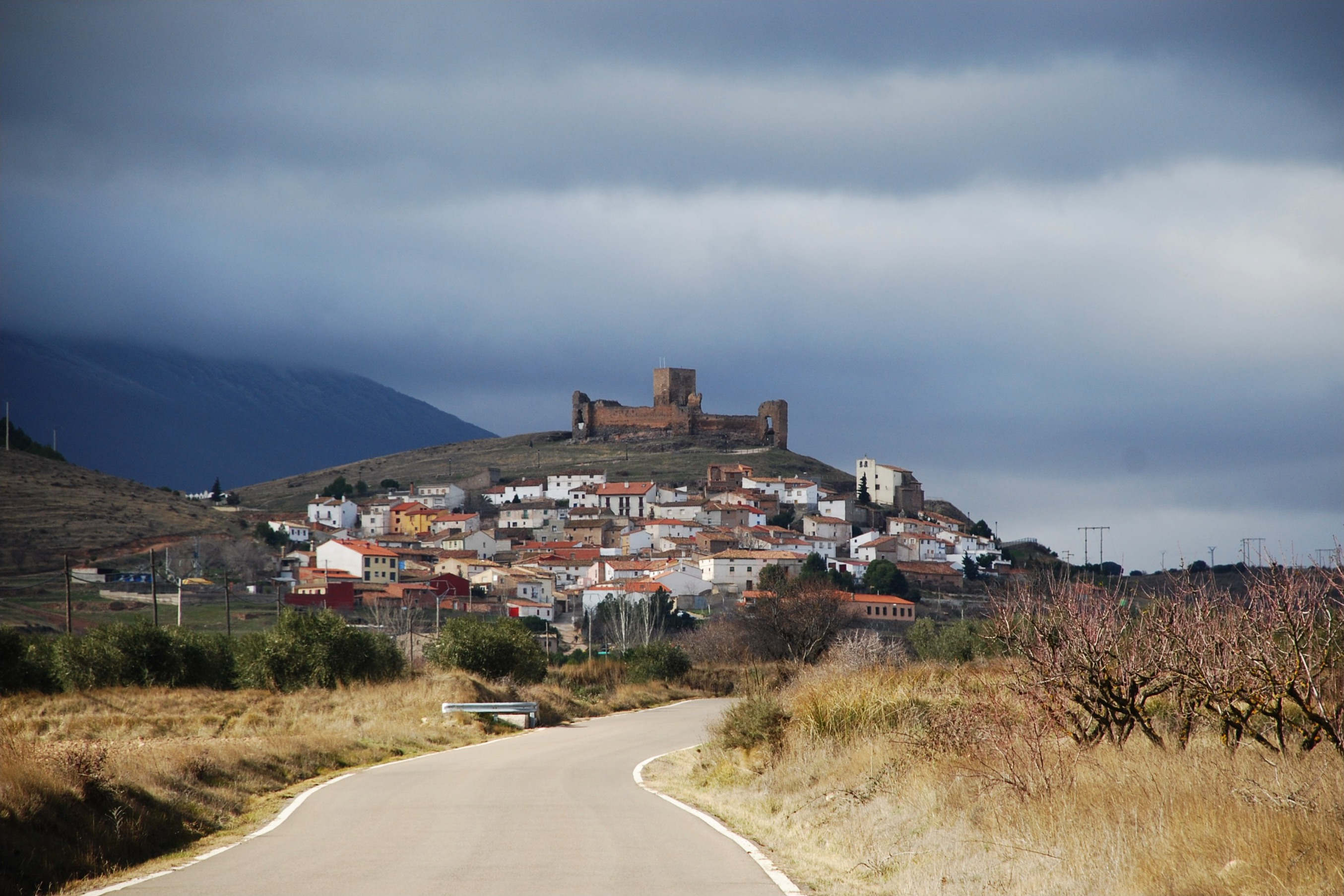
- Trasmoz overall view

- Coat of arms

- Location within Spain Location within Aragon
- Coordinates: 41°49′35″N 1°43′25″W
- Country: Spain
- Autonomous Community: Aragon
- Province: Zaragoza
- Comarca: Tarazona y el Moncayo

Government
  - Mayor: Jesús Daniel Andía Berna (PP)

Area
  - Total: 18.26 km^{2} (7.05 sq mi)
- Elevation: 765 m (2,510 ft)

Population (2025-01-01)
  - Total: 88
  - Density: 4.8/km^{2} (12/sq mi)
- Time zone: UTC+1 (CET)
  - Summer (DST): UTC+2 (CEST)

Trasmoz is a village in the province of Zaragoza, Aragon, Spain, with an estimated population of 96.

The town has given rise to numerous legends about witches and sabbaths, some of which were recreated by the romantic writer Gustavo Adolfo Bécquer. It is the only Spanish town officially cursed and excommunicated by the Catholic Church. The excommunication has never been revoked.

Trasmoz is a town steeped in witchcraft. Each year, a citizen is awarded with the distinction "Bruja del Año" (Witch of the year) in recognition of the services for the community. White commemorative plaques are installed on the front door of the awarded person's house.

== History ==
=== Middle Ages ===
The origin of the village can be tracked back to the 12th century, when the lordship of Trasmoz was founded. It alternately belonged to the Kingdom of Navarre and the Kingdom of Aragon until Jaime I, king of Aragón, definitively conquered it in 1232. In 1437 Alfonso V put it under the authority of Don Lope Ximenez de Urrea (I count of Aranda).

=== Modern Ages ===
After the death of Lope, his two sons fought for the Señorío de Trasmoz. Finally, the younger, Pedro Manuel Ximenez de Urrea, won. Pedro Manuel had a conflict, very close to a civil war, with Veruela Abbey for the irrigation water. The response from the Abbey was a curse and the excommunication of the whole town.

About 1530 the Castle of Trasmoz was abandoned. Afterwards, there was a fire in the tower of homage, and a significant fraction of building materials were reused.

== Places of interest ==
=== Castle of Trasmoz ===
It was abandoned in 1530. In 1998 Manuel Jalón Corominas created the "Foundation Castillo de Trasmoz" after purchasing the building. Then the castle was rebuilt.

The floor of the castle is hexagonal, with towers in the vertexes, built between the 13th and 15th centuries. The tower of homage is the oldest remain, it is of squared floor, it is located in the center of the castle, formerly it was finished with battlements.

Today, the castle houses the "Museum of Witchery".

=== Church of Santa María de La Huerta ===
The building is of Gothic style (XVI).The oldest part is the arch of the main door where a Chi-Rho Christogram from the late 13th century can be found.

=== Nayim's Goal Street ===
Named to remember the epic football goal scored by Nayim in the final seconds of extra-time in the 1995 UEFA Cup Winners' Cup Final from 45 yards (41 metres), it broke the tie, and won the 1995 UEFA Cup Winners' Cup for the Real Zaragoza.

=== Monument to the mop ===
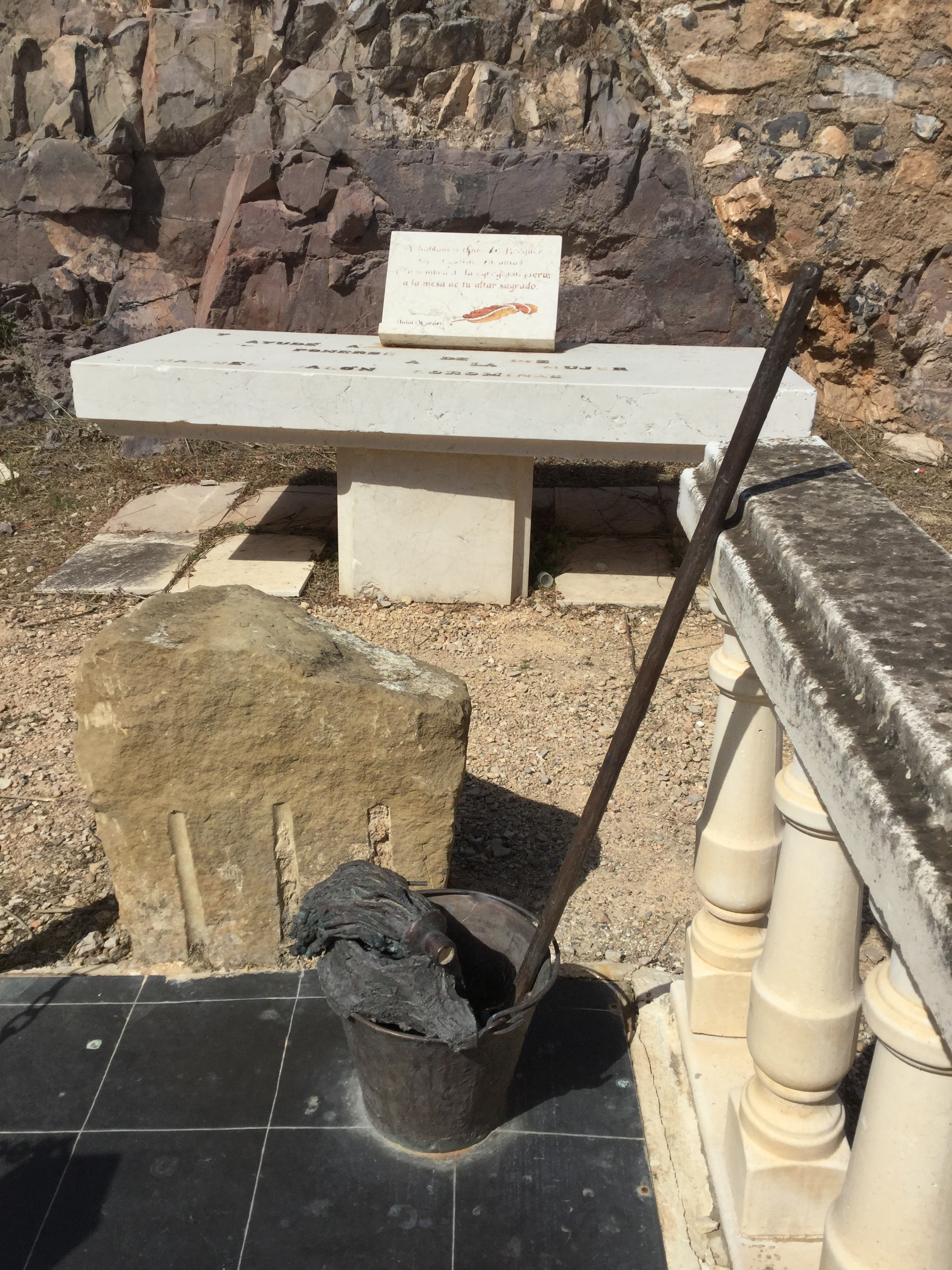
Monument to the mop

Manuel Jalón Corominas, the Spanish inventor of the mop and its bucket, was a temporary resident in the village. After his death in 2011 a monument to his most celebrated creation was erected by the sculptor Luigi Maráez.

== Miscellanea ==
1. Don Pedro Ramírez and his son were sentenced to death for forging fake coins in the castle. The faked coins are known as "Maravedies falsos de Trasmoz".
2. Julio Iglesias Puga, father of the singer Julio Iglesias, was kidnapped by the Basque separatist ETA. He was in a house in Trasmoz for the 21 days that the kidnapping lasted. He was freed on 17 January 1982 in an operation by Spanish GEO (Grupo Especial de Operaciones) involving about 100 policemen.
3. It is one of the few Spanish villages not to have been covered either by Google Street View or by Apple Look Around.

== See also ==
- List of municipalities in Zaragoza
