= Spray-and-vac cleaning =

No-touch cleaning method used by professional cleaners

Spray-and-vac cleaning is a “no-touch” method – cleaning is accomplished without the need for workers to touch soiled surfaces with their hands – used in professional cleaning in which a pressurized, diluted cleaning solution is applied to soiled or contaminated surfaces.

== Description ==
To start, a diluted cleaning solution (white vinegar, bleach and detergent) is sprayed onto all surfaces to be cleaned, Using the same machine, the area is then rinsed; this is typically followed by vacuum suctioning that removes the applied liquid along with the suspended solids and dissolved contaminants that have been removed from the surface.

A key advantage of this method over traditional approaches is the ability to deep clean grouted areas (e.g. wall, counter and floor tile) preventing buildup of soil and bacteria in grout lines. Application of a cleaning solution followed by pressurized rinsing and vacuuming removes soil more effectively than methods that rely solely on absorbent wiping (e.g. mopping, microfiber and cleaning cloth use). In addition, studies published by the International Sanitary Supply Association (ISSA) have found that compared to legacy methods these systems potentially reduce cleaning times by 1/3 or more.

Unlike outdoor pressure washers with application pressures of 1,000 – 5,000 pounds per square inch (34,000 kPa), spray-and-vac units are designed for long-term indoor use on grout and other surfaces, and offer variable application pressures ranging from 110–500 pounds per square inch (760–3,450 kPa).

== History ==
The first spray-and-vac system was developed by inventor Robert S. Robinson in 1997. A United States patent was issued in 2001, and the technology has since been licensed by other manufacturers of cleaning equipment. A number of manufacturers in the cleaning industry now produce and market spray-and-vac systems or systems that are similar, and approximately 40,000–50,000 units have been sold worldwide. Some systems are battery-operated; others do not have vacuuming capabilities but are still classified under this product category.

Spray-and-vac systems first became popular for restroom cleaning. However, over the years, users have found a variety of other uses for the equipment, including cleaning chairs and tables in cafeterias, cleaning carpets and hard-surface flooring, and deep-cleaning a variety of surfaces.

An emerging market for spray-and-vac systems is public schools, where the ability of the units to remove organic soils thoroughly, documented by adenosine triphosphate (ATP) bioluminescence testing, is displacing traditional mop-and-bucket cleaning methods. Correctional and foodservice markets are also appropriate for this method since they typically feature grouted ceramic tile floors.

== Effectiveness ==
Studies indicate there is not always a high degree of correlation between how clean a surface looks and the levels of contamination actually present. Spray-and-vac systems, are claimed to effectively remove embedded soils and contaminants as well as biological contaminants that are not visible to the naked eye. Such surfaces are typically referred to as “hygienically cleaned”.

Scientific evidence of this is provided through the use of technologies such as adenosine triphosphate (ATP) bioluminescence rapid-monitoring systems. These systems indicate the presence of organic matter that may host harmful microorganisms on a variety of surfaces. In addition to detecting contaminants, ATP systems also provide “proof of service” that an area has been effectively and thoroughly cleaned. According to scientific studies using ATP technology, spray-and-vac systems have been proven to remove more contaminants and disease-causing germs and bacteria on surfaces when compared to conventional mop, bucket, and cloth style cleaning. Additionally, tests show that spray-and-vac systems do not spread contaminants from surface to surface, as can happen when using conventional cleaning methods.
