= Mop =

Cleaning tool made up of coarse strings

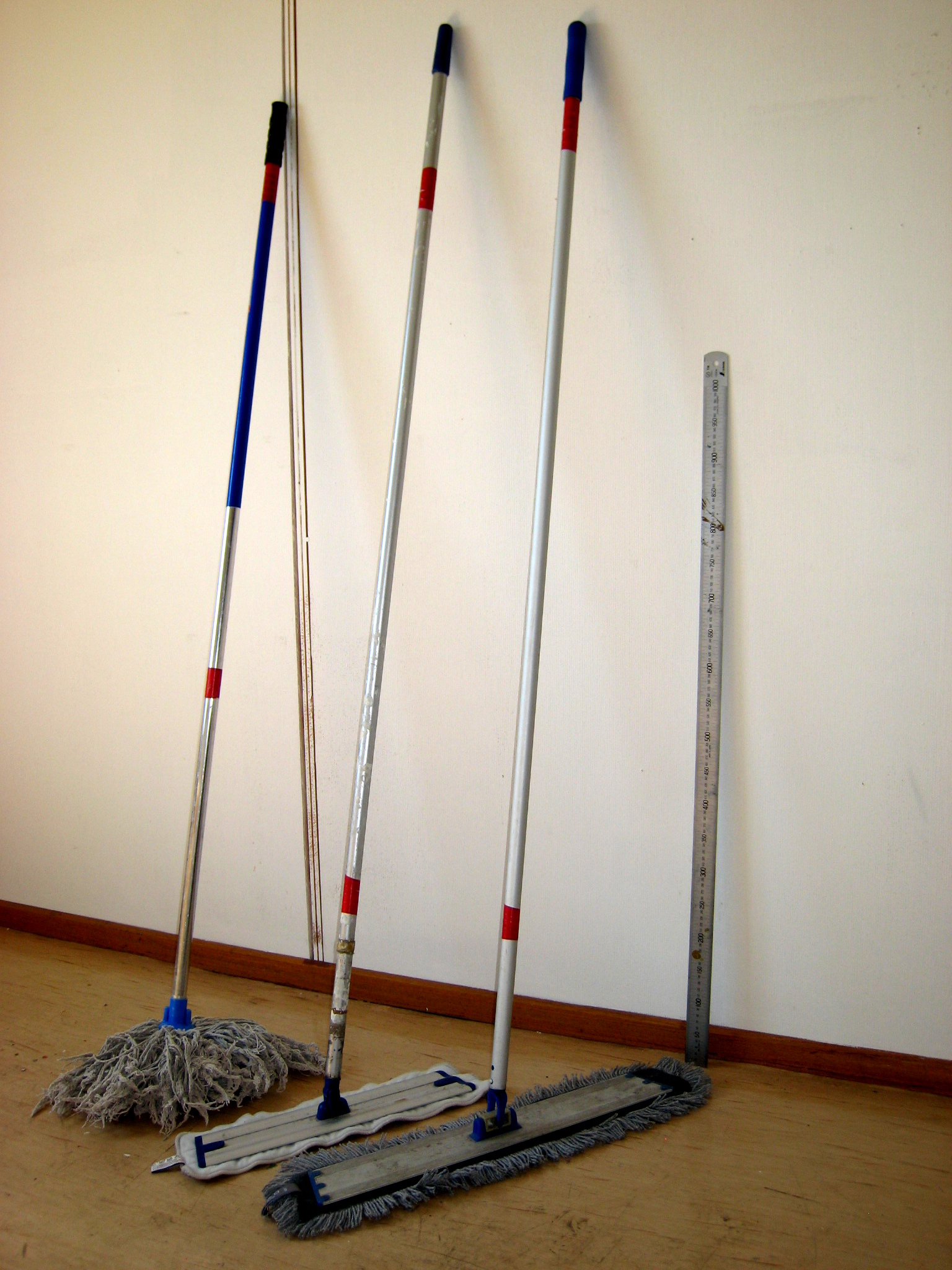
Three styles of mop

A mop (such as a floor mop) is a mass or bundle of coarse strings or yarn, etc., or a piece of cloth, sponge or other absorbent material, attached to a pole or stick. It is used to soak up liquid, for cleaning floors and other surfaces, to mop up dust, or for other cleaning purposes.

== History ==
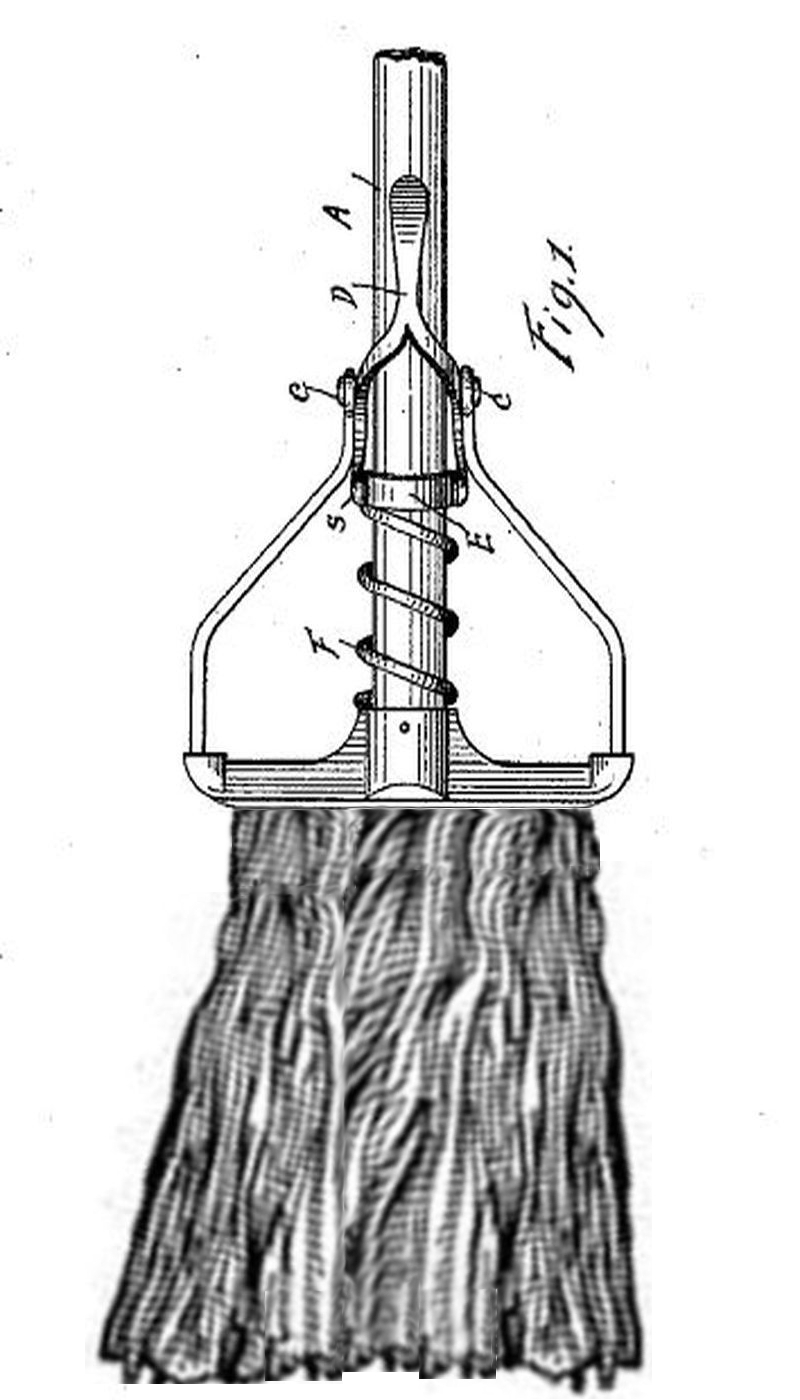
Mop and mop head, as described by Thomas W. Stewart in 1893

The word "mop" is known in English as early as the late 15th century. At this time, it was spelled mappe, and may have been related to the Latin word mappa, meaning 'napkin'. Records of refinements and variations on mop designs are known from early patents. American inventor Jacob Howe received US patent #241 for a simple mop holder in 1837; Thomas W. Stewart was issued US patent #499,402 in 1893 for a design making use of springs and levers to hold the mop.

The American mechanical expert Edward H. Knight wrote in the second volume of his American Mechanical Dictionary, published 1876, about the mops contemporary to his time. Such devices were described as a scrubbing rag or "bundle of junk" secured by a handle. A mop head was to be attached to the handle, which is a device that clamps on to the rag. The clamp was variously operated by turning the entire head on a screw, turning a wingnut on the handle, or by manually pressing the jaws of the clamp together and securing them with a ring. As an alternative to a mop head, a flat-headed mop-nail could be used to fasten the rag or junk to the handle. Mop-wringers, devices with rollers designed to squeeze the liquid out of a mop, were also known by this time.

== Types ==
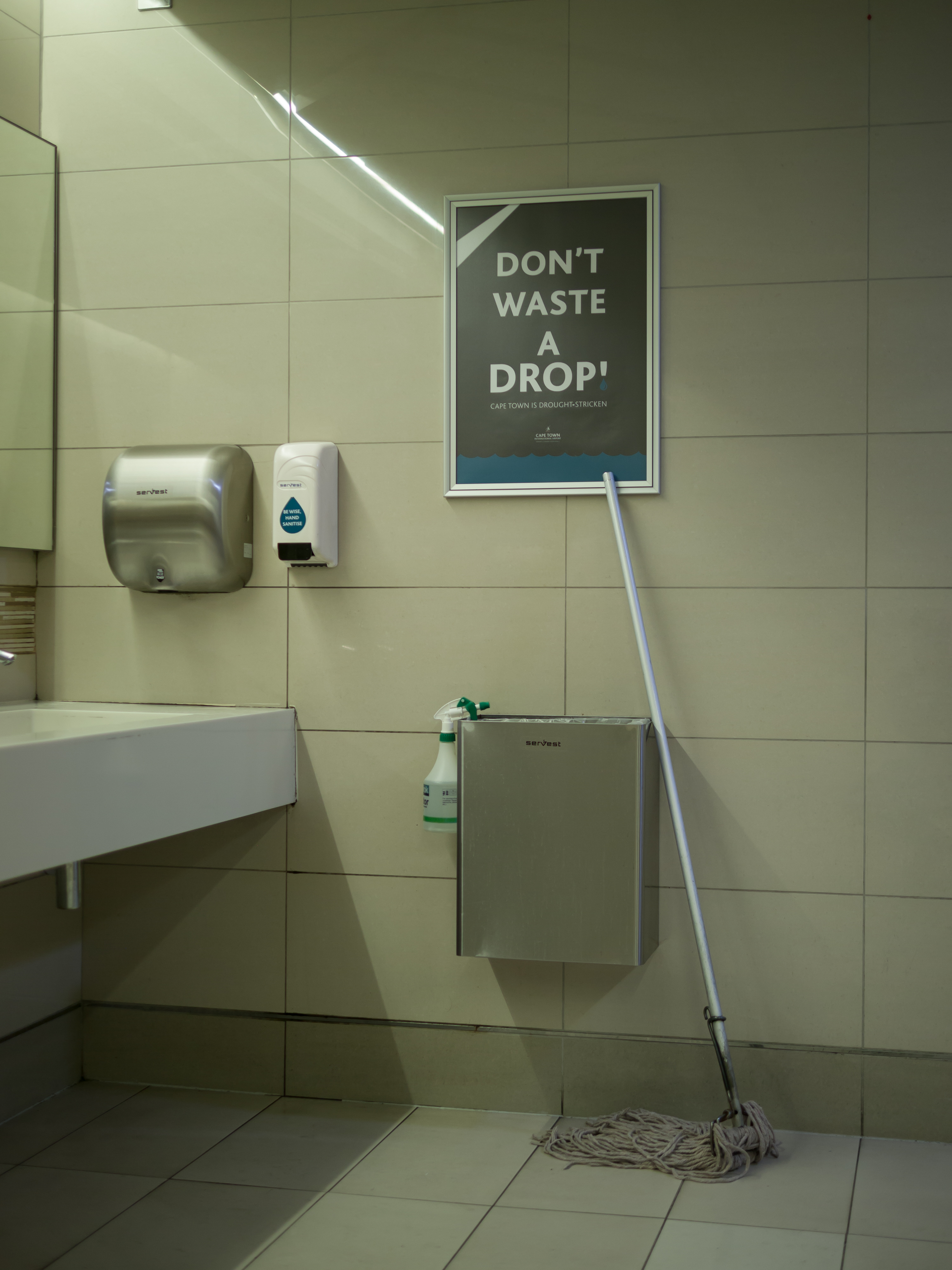
A classic string mop leaning against a waste receptacle

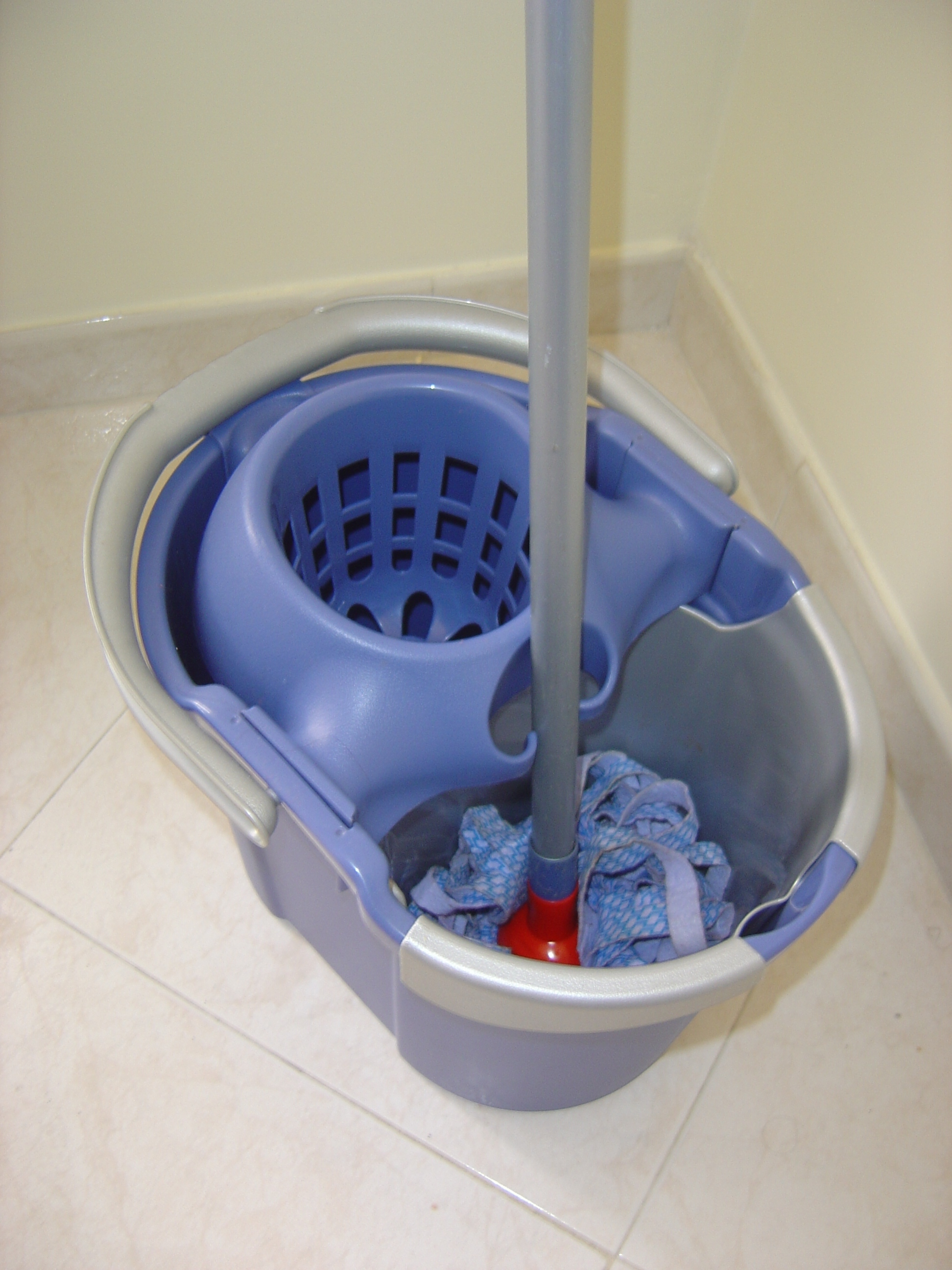
A Spanish-style mop, as designed by Manuel Jalón Corominas, in a bucket with its wringer

Many different proprietary designs are available. The most familiar forms of mop are designs that use many strings or flat pads.

=== Dry mop, dust mop ===
A dry mop or dust mop is designed to pick up dry, loose contaminants such as dust, earth, and sand from the surface of the floor. It often consists of cotton and/or microfiber, and is typically used as the first step of surface cleaning.

Professional dry mops consist of a flat sheet of microfiber textile or sheets with a surface of looped yarn, usually about 15 cm (6 in) wide, and come in variable lengths (usually 30–100 cm (12–39 in)).

The dry mop can, in many instances, replace a broom and has the ability to hold a limited amount of dust, sand, and debris within itself. The heads of dry mops are often removable and can be washed and replaced when saturated with dust. Dry mopping or sweeping is generally more effective at removing dust than damp or wet mopping.

=== Wet-mop, moist-mop ===
A wet mop or moist mop is, in professional cleaning, used as the second step in the cleaning of a surface. The wet mop is swept over the surface to dissolve and absorb fat, mud, and dried-on liquid contaminants. Professional wet mops consist of a flat sheet of microfiber textile or a sheet with a surface of looped yarn (which might contain microfiber as well), usually about 15 cm (6 in) wide, and come in various lengths (usually 30–100 cm (12–39 in)).

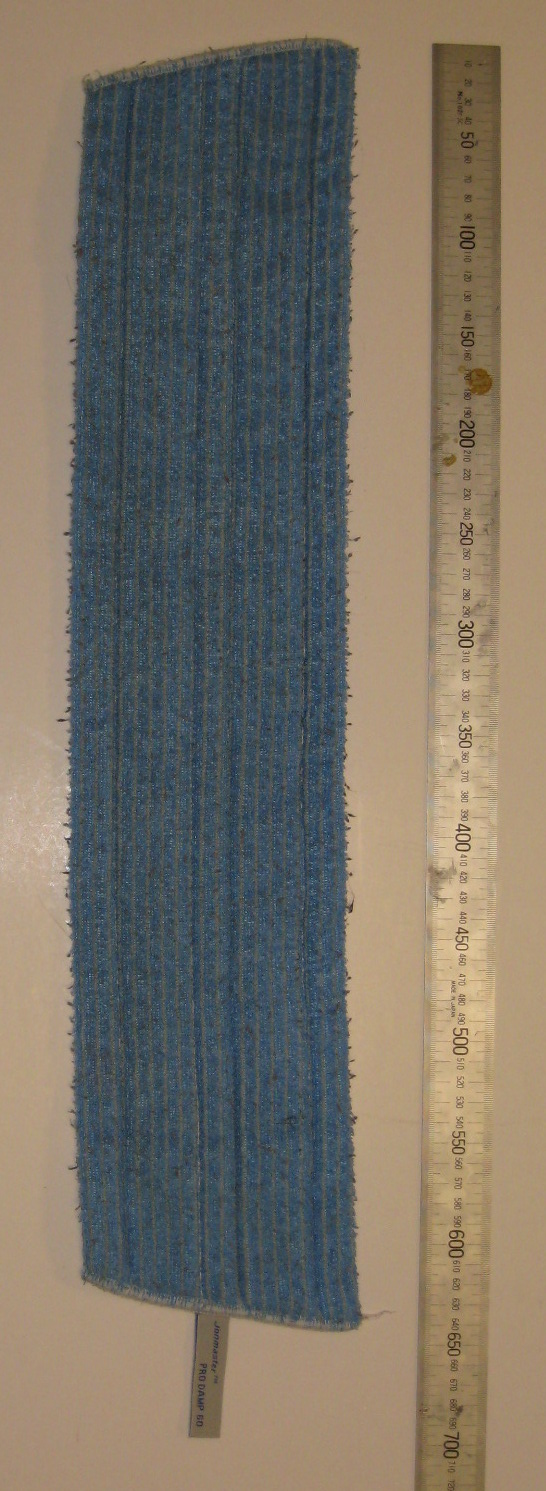
Flat wet-mop (pre-moistening), looped microfiber with Velcro attachment on back

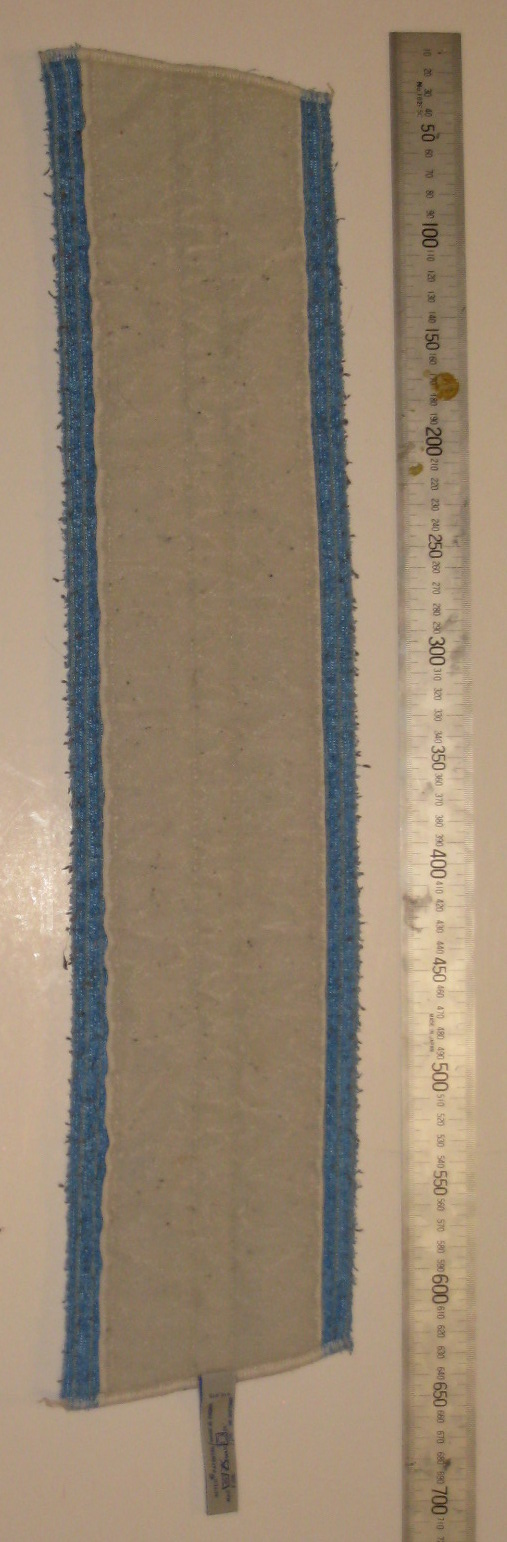
Flat wet-mop (back view of previous mop)

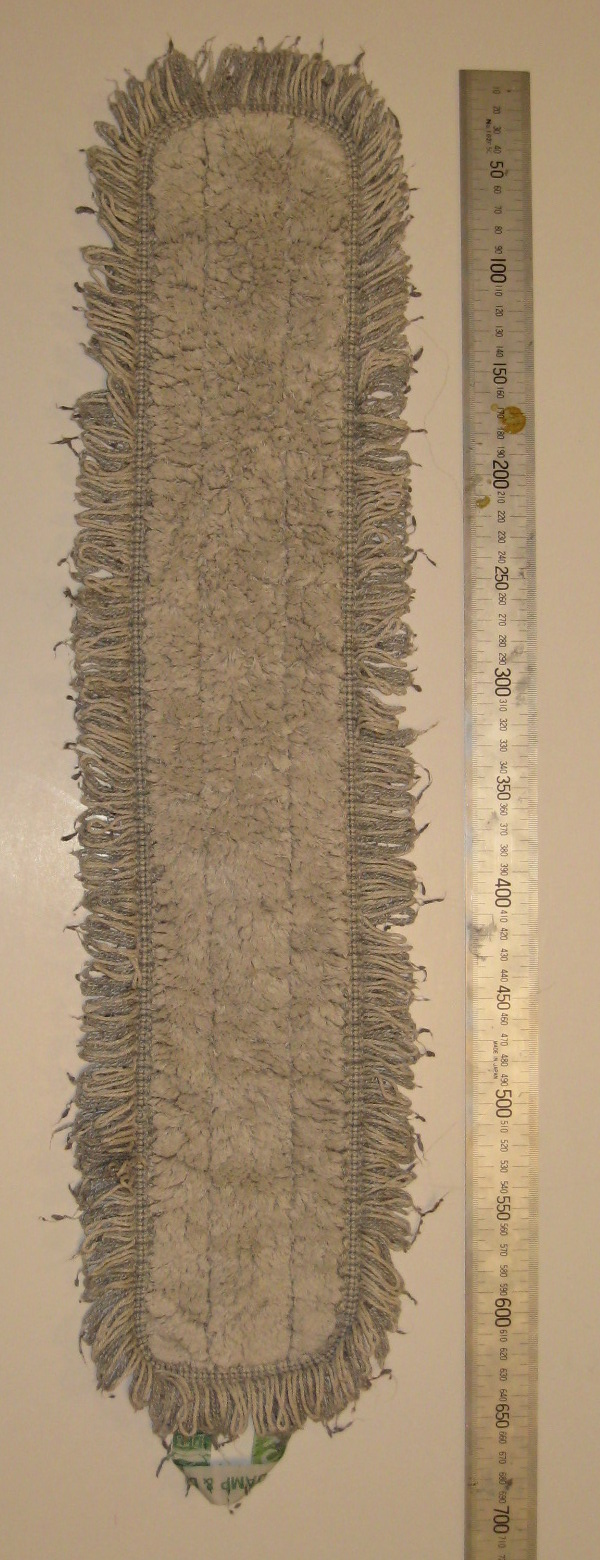
Flat mop for dry or wet (pre-moistening) use, open-end microfiber with looped yarn edges, Velcro attachment

=== Mops for pre-moistening ===
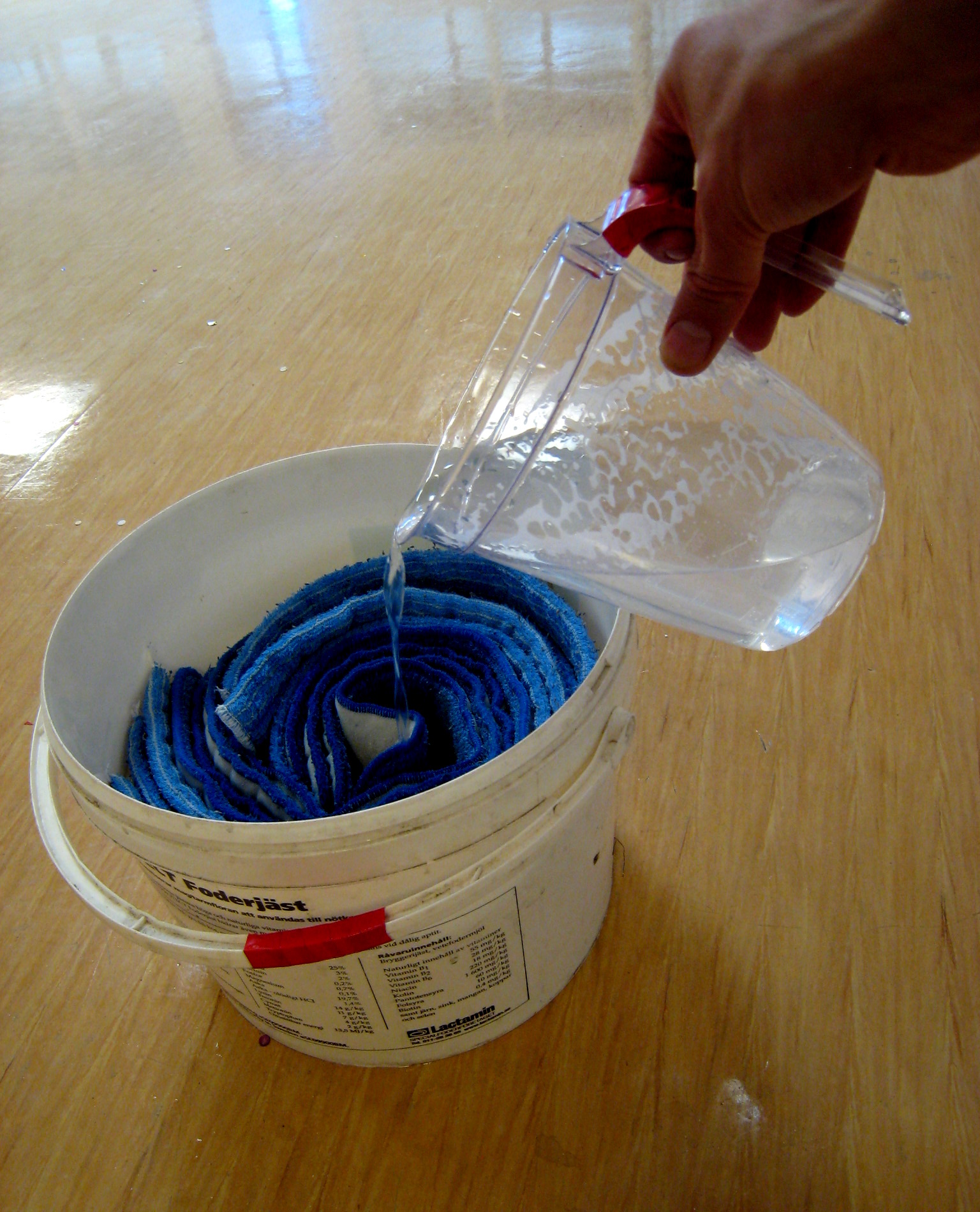
Manual pre-moistening of wet-mops in bucket

Professional flat mops are made for pre-moistening. Mops are pre-impregnated with an ideal amount of water mixed with an appropriate amount of detergent. This means that the cleaner does not need to bring any additional water on the cleaning trolley. This ideal amount is often recommended by the manufacturer in terms of weight percentage of water per weight of the dry mop, for example "175% water per weight of the dry mop".

Mops for pre-moistening are flat sheets of (often microfiber) textile, usually about 15 cm (6 in) wide, and come in variable lengths (usually 30–100 cm (12–39 in)). Mops for pre-moistening are fastened on a handle with a flat pad mount with the aid of Velcro or a pouch on the mop, in which the pad on the handle fits.

Pre-moistening can be done with a special washing machine, or by hand by simply folding and packing the mops tight in a container and pouring the measured amount of water over them. The mops will then need about 5–10 minutes for the liquid to distribute evenly in their tissue before use. This offers some advantages:

- The cleaner does not have to bring a heavy bucket of water when mopping the floor, but simply carries an appropriate number of mops. This means the weight of the equipment can often be kept lower.
- The risk of over-wetting the floor and leaving puddles is reduced.

=== Hot mop ===
The hot mop (or steam mop) follows a similar concept to a steam iron. After adding water, the water is heated to make it exude on top of a floor, which can then be cleaned without using a cleaning solvent. These can work best on surfaces where a regular mop would also be used, such as bare floors, hearths, and laminate.

=== Microfiber mop ===
Microfiber mops are constructed of a blend of polyester and polyamide fibers which are "split" and formed into a single fiber. This blend consists of 70–90% polyester that serves as the scrubbing and cleaning fiber and 10–30% polyamide which performs as the holding and quick drying fiber. This blend is usually expressed as a ratio on the label of the mop, e.g. an 80% polyester and 20% polyamide blend would be labeled as "80/20".

=== Sponge mop ===
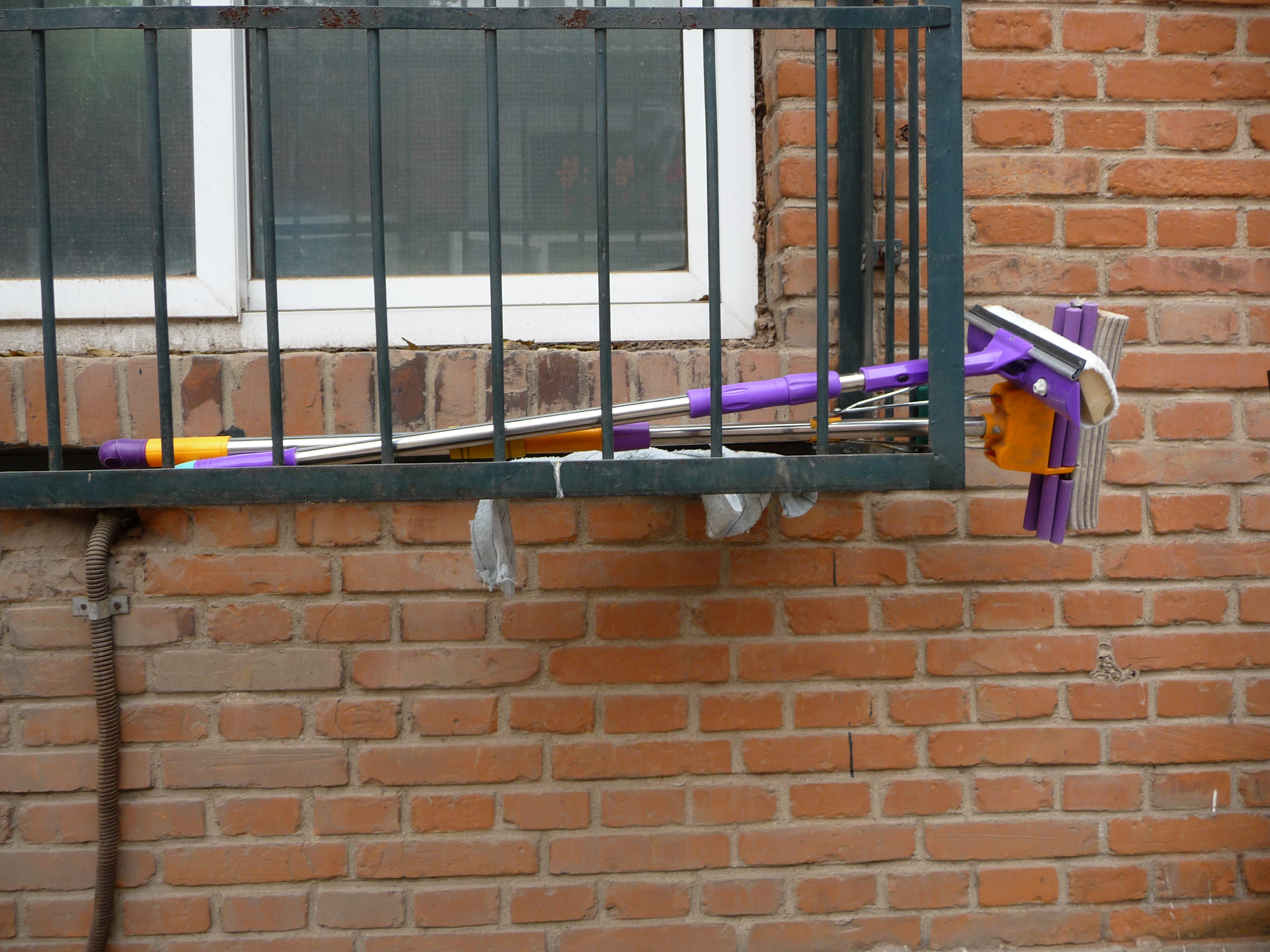
Two sponge mops, one of which is covered

Sponge mop heads are constructed with a cellulosic, rubber, or plastic foam block, usually attached by crimping a metal clip on one side. Sometimes, the foam mop head may be covered by a cloth or mesh sheet, to improve its resistance to wear from heavy scrubbing.

The sponge is then attached to a handle mechanism which can compress the mop head, by means of rollers or a pivoted flat perforated blade. For consumer-grade sponge mops, the mop mechanism may be made of either plastic or metal. For heavy-duty or professional use, the mechanism is usually made of a corrosion-resistant metal such as stainless steel, and the mop head is often rubber or premium plastic foam.

For clean room environments, a stainless steel handle and mechanism are preferred, along with a mop head made of a foam which has been formulated to minimize shedding of small particles. For use in microbiological labs, mops are made of materials which can be sterilized by autoclave or by ethylene oxide treatment.

=== Cloth mop ===
A cloth mop (also called a "Cuban mop") is a simple T-shaped wooden handle, around which is wrapped a sturdy cloth towel. Its advantages are low cost and easy replacement of the mop head, which can simply be washed by hand or tossed into a washing machine.

== Handles and mounting ==
A mop handle consists of a long piece of wood or metal tubing fitted with a specific attachment for the mop head. The handle can be attached the mop head by means of:

- clamp
- hanger (with strands doubled over the hanger)
- plastic claws (attached to the strands)
- pouch (as with many professional flat mops)
- screwing (as with the classic yarn mop)
- Velcro (as with many professional flat mops)

=== Gallery ===
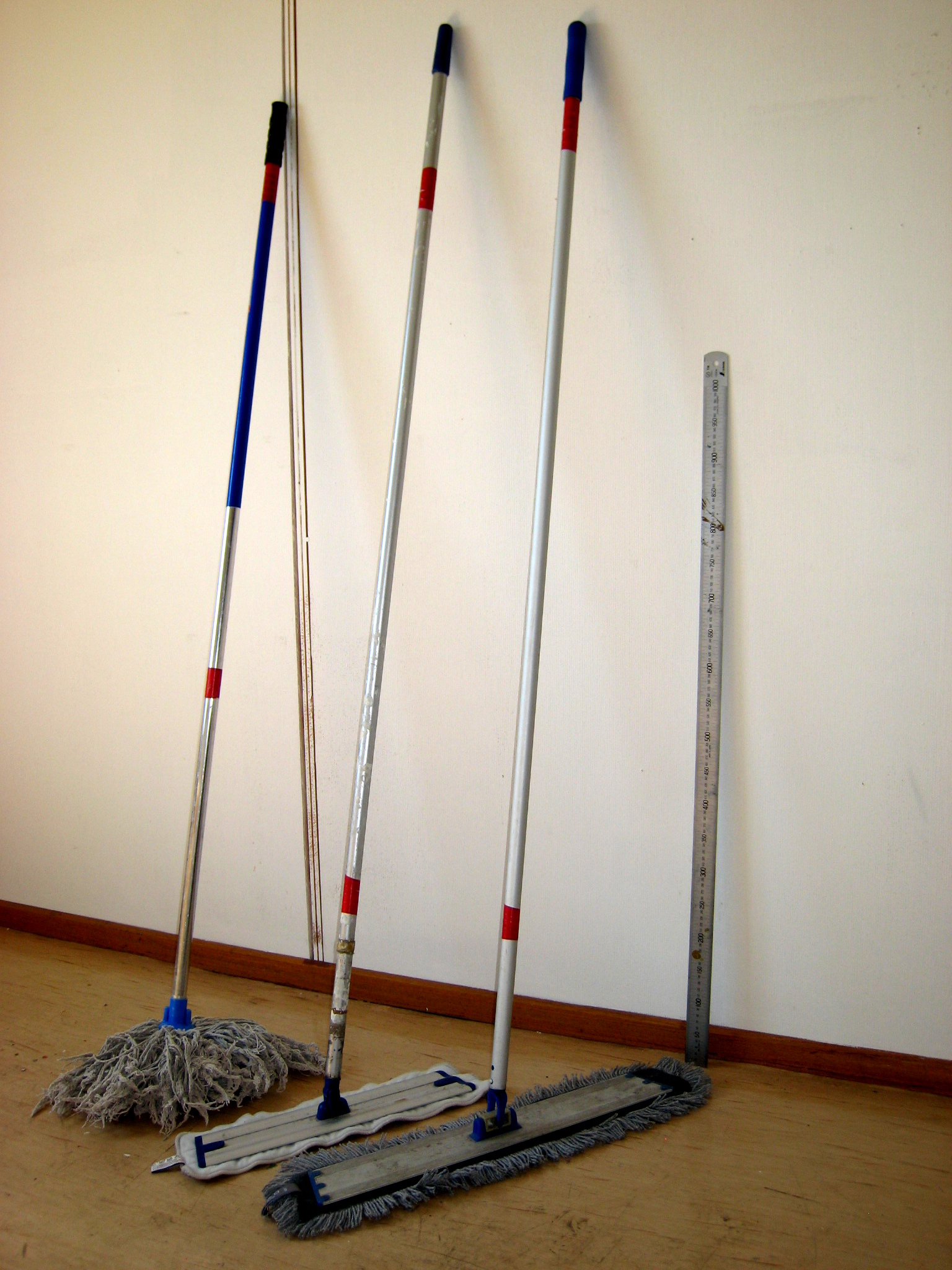
Mop handles From left: Classic yarn mop handle made of aluminum (thread mount), unadjustable aluminum handle for Velcro attached mop (50 cm), unadjustable aluminum handle for Velcro attached mop (60 cm), scale included for reference.

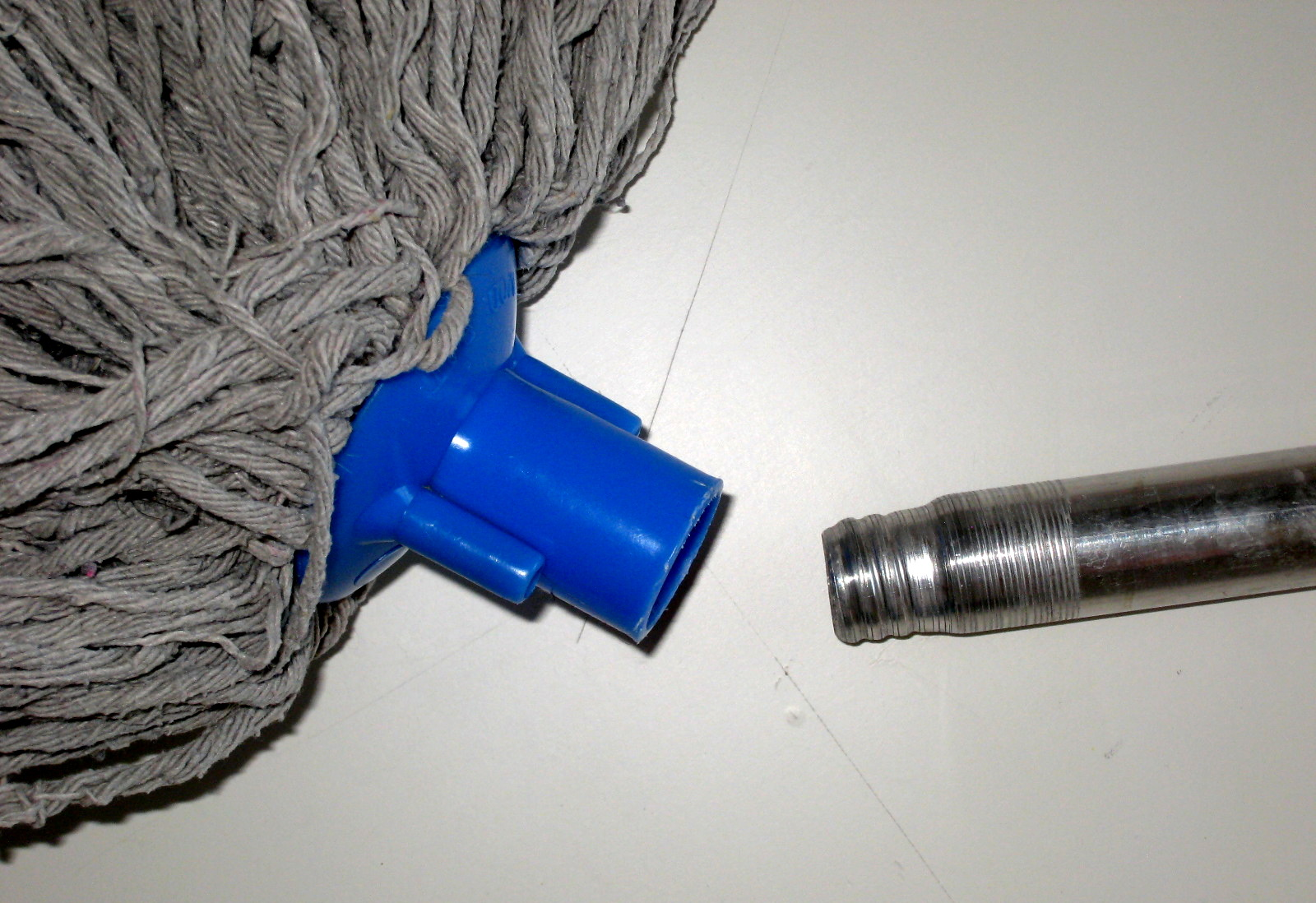
Detail of mop mounting piece (blue plastic) and mount

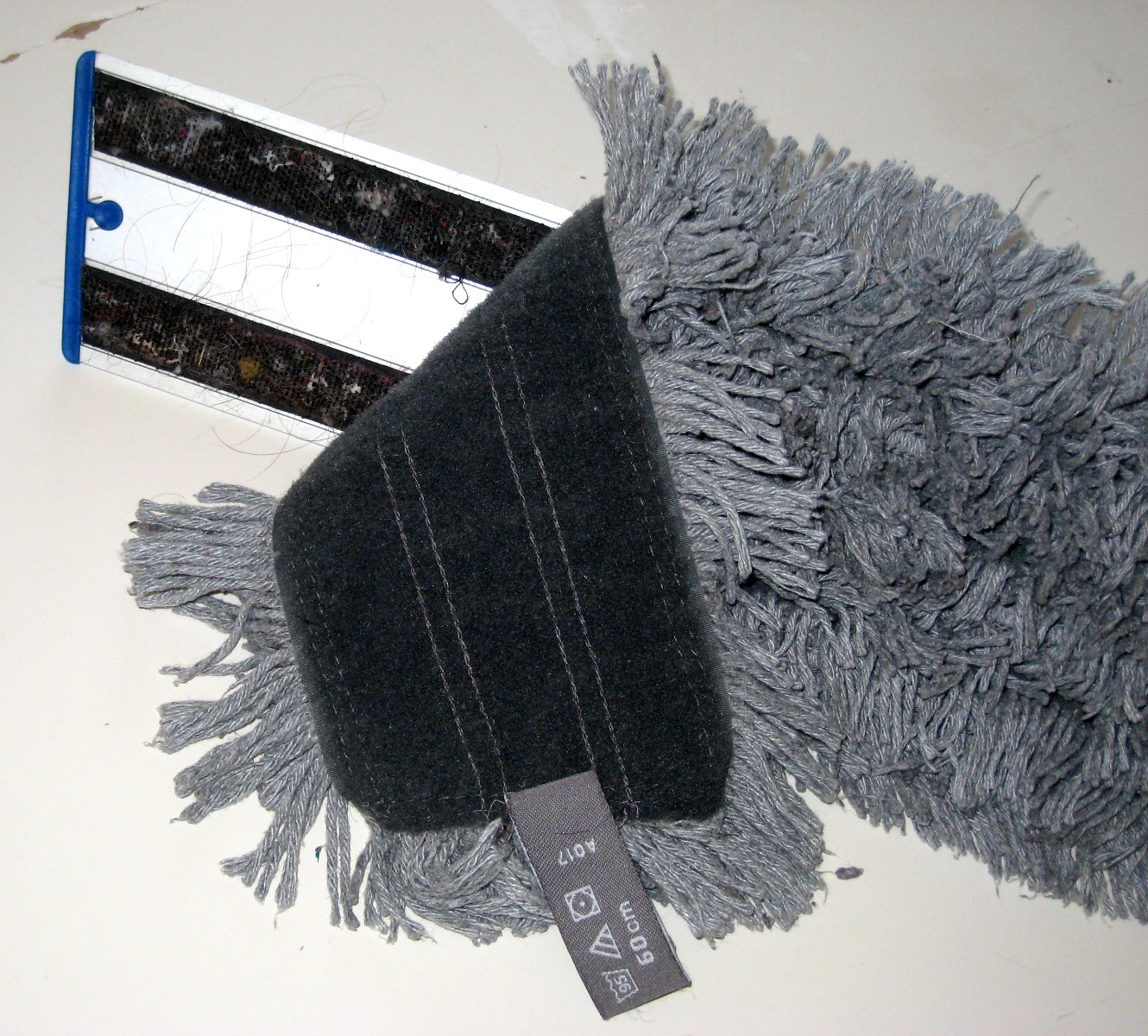
Velcro attached mop with mount

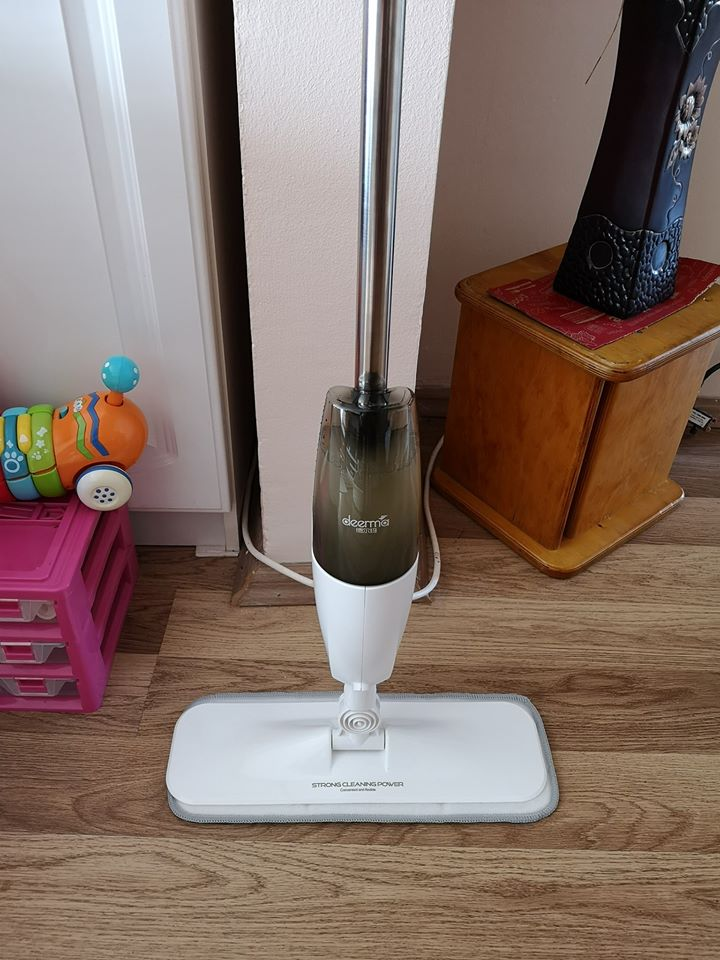
Xiaomi Deerma spray mop

== See also ==
- Floor buffer
- Floor scrubber
- Mop dog
